= National Register of Historic Places listings in Androscoggin County, Maine =

Location of Androscoggin County in Maine

This is a list of the National Register of Historic Places listings in Androscoggin County, Maine. This is intended to be a complete list of the properties and districts on the National Register of Historic Places in Androscoggin County, Maine, United States. Latitude and longitude coordinates are provided for many National Register properties and districts; these locations may be seen together in a map.

There are 108 properties and districts listed on the National Register in the county, including 1 National Historic Landmark. Another 9 sites once listed on the Register have been removed.

This National Park Service list is complete through NPS recent listings posted May 1, 2026.

Contents: Counties and municipalities in Maine
Androscoggin - Aroostook - Cumberland (City of Portland) - Franklin - Hancock - Kennebec - Knox - Lincoln - Oxford - Penobscot - Piscataquis - Sagadahoc - Somerset - Waldo - Washington - York

== Current listings ==
	Name on the Register	Image	Date listed	Location	City or town	Description
1	All Souls Chapel	All Souls Chapel	November 17, 1977 (#77000060)	South of Mechanic Falls on State Route 26 at Poland Spring; 44°01′35″N 70°21′40″W	Poland	
2	Androscoggin County Courthouse and Jail	Androscoggin County Courthouse and Jail	December 29, 1983 (#83003633)	2 Turner St. 44°05′52″N 70°13′38″W	Auburn	
3	Androscoggin Mill Block	Androscoggin Mill Block	April 12, 2001 (#01000367)	269-271 Park St. 44°05′27″N 70°12′49″W	Lewiston	
4	Atkinson Building	Atkinson Building	February 2, 1983 (#83000444)	220 Lisbon St. 44°05′41″N 70°13′00″W	Lewiston	
5	Auburn Commercial Historic District	Auburn Commercial Historic District	December 29, 2014 (#14001087)	Main & Court Sts. 44°05′50″N 70°13′29″W	Auburn	
6	Auburn Public Library	Auburn Public Library	March 22, 1984 (#84001357)	49 Spring St. 44°05′53″N 70°13′47″W	Auburn	
7	Bagley-Bliss House	Bagley-Bliss House	March 22, 1996 (#96000242)	1290 Royalsborough Rd. 43°56′48″N 70°07′12″W	South Durham	Now the Royalsborough Inn.
8	Barker Mill	Barker Mill	May 8, 1979 (#79000123)	143 Mill St. 44°05′15″N 70°13′39″W	Auburn	
9	Bates Mill Historic District	Bates Mill Historic District	December 15, 2010 (#10001036)	Roughly bounded by Canal St., Chestnut St,, Lincoln St, and Main St. 44°05′44″N 70°13′11″W	Lewiston	
10	Big Ram Site	Big Ram Site	November 14, 1992 (#92001515)	On Ram Island; 44°19′20″N 70°11′06″W	Ram Island	
11	William Briggs Homestead	William Briggs Homestead	March 20, 1986 (#86000477)	1470 Turner St. 44°07′35″N 70°13′50″W	Auburn	
12	Cape Site		November 14, 1992 (#92001511)	Address Restricted	West Leeds	
13	John D. Clifford House	John D. Clifford House	December 30, 1987 (#87002190)	14-16 Ware St. 44°06′35″N 70°12′29″W	Lewiston	
14	Clough Meeting House	Clough Meeting House	June 25, 2013 (#13000438)	32 South Lisbon Road; 44°03′49″N 70°08′52″W	Lewiston	
15	College Block-Lisbon Block	College Block-Lisbon Block	April 25, 1986 (#86002279)	248-274 Lisbon St. 44°05′39″N 70°12′58″W	Lewiston	
16	Continental Mill Housing	Continental Mill Housing	July 10, 1979 (#79000124)	66-82 Oxford St. 44°05′30″N 70°13′11″W	Lewiston	
17	Charles L. Cushman House	Charles L. Cushman House	June 16, 1980 (#80000210)	8 Cushman Pl. 44°05′25″N 70°13′56″W	Auburn	
18	Danville Junction Grange #65	Danville Junction Grange #65	April 5, 2016 (#16000138)	15 Grange St. 44°01′22″N 70°15′53″W	Auburn	
19	Holman Day House	Holman Day House	January 20, 1978 (#78000155)	2 Goff St. 44°05′54″N 70°13′57″W	Auburn	
20	Frank L. Dingley House	Frank L. Dingley House	April 23, 1980 (#80000211)	291 Court St. 44°05′53″N 70°13′58″W	Auburn	
21	Dominican Block	Dominican Block	January 15, 1980 (#80000212)	141-145 Lincoln St. 44°05′34″N 70°13′10″W	Lewiston	
22	Elms	Elms	March 21, 1985 (#85000610)	Elm St. 44°06′38″N 70°23′25″W	Mechanic Falls	
23	Engine House	Engine House	May 22, 1978 (#78000156)	Court and Spring Sts. 44°05′50″N 70°13′40″W	Auburn	
24	Excelsior Grange #5	Excelsior Grange #5	April 5, 2016 (#16000137)	446 Harris Hill Rd. 44°04′57″N 70°21′55″W	Poland	
25	Farwell Mill	Farwell Mill	June 20, 1985 (#85001260)	State Route 196; 44°01′52″N 70°06′15″W	Lisbon	
26	First Callahan Building	First Callahan Building	April 25, 1986 (#86002280)	276 Lisbon St. 44°05′39″N 70°12′58″W	Lewiston	
27	First McGillicuddy Block	First McGillicuddy Block	April 25, 1986 (#86002281)	133 Lisbon St. 44°05′47″N 70°13′04″W	Lewiston	
28	First National Bank	First National Bank	April 25, 1986 (#86002282)	157-163 Main St. 44°05′55″N 70°13′06″W	Lewiston	
29	First Universalist Church	First Universalist Church	May 7, 1979 (#79000126)	Elm and Pleasant Sts. 44°05′39″N 70°13′46″W	Auburn	
30	Horatio G. Foss House	Horatio G. Foss House	November 21, 1976 (#76000084)	19 Elm St. 44°05′37″N 70°13′38″W	Auburn	
31	Free Baptist Church	Free Baptist Church	July 13, 1989 (#89000843)	Riverside Dr. 44°03′11″N 70°12′11″W	Auburn	Also known as the Penley Corner Church.
32	Sen. William P. Frye House	Sen. William P. Frye House	October 8, 1976 (#76000189)	453-461 Main St. 44°06′22″N 70°12′40″W	Lewiston	
33	A. A. Garcelon House	A. A. Garcelon House	June 13, 1986 (#86001269)	223 Main St. 44°05′38″N 70°13′36″W	Auburn	
34	Gay-Munroe House	Gay-Munroe House	December 31, 2001 (#01001422)	64 Highland Ave. 44°06′00″N 70°14′04″W	Auburn	
35	Grand Trunk Railroad Station	Grand Trunk Railroad Station	June 4, 1979 (#79000127)	Lincoln St. 44°05′37″N 70°13′12″W	Lewiston	
36	Hathorn Hall, Bates College	Hathorn Hall, Bates College	August 25, 1970 (#70000071)	Bates College campus 44°06′23″N 70°12′17″W	Lewiston	
37	Healey Asylum	Healey Asylum	October 1, 1979 (#79000128)	81 Ash St. 44°05′50″N 70°12′49″W	Lewiston	
38	Captain Holland House	Captain Holland House	March 21, 1985 (#85000609)	142 College St. 44°06′08″N 70°12′38″W	Lewiston	
39	Holland-Drew House	Holland-Drew House	December 22, 1978 (#78000324)	377 Main St. 44°06′12″N 70°12′44″W	Lewiston	
40	Irish Site		November 14, 1992 (#92001517)	Address Restricted	East Auburn	
41	Philip M. and Deborah N. Isaacson House	Philip M. and Deborah N. Isaacson House	November 18, 2011 (#11000816)	2 Benson St. 44°06′30″N 70°12′25″W	Lewiston	
42	Jordan School	Jordan School	March 22, 1984 (#84001355)	35 Wood St. 44°06′03″N 70°12′36″W	Lewiston	
43	Charles A. Jordan House	Charles A. Jordan House	July 15, 1974 (#74000147)	63 Academy St. 44°05′34″N 70°13′45″W	Auburn	
44	F.M. Jordan House	F.M. Jordan House	December 29, 2014 (#14001088)	18 Laurel Ave. 44°05′24″N 70°13′31″W	Auburn	
45	Keystone Mineral Springs	Keystone Mineral Springs	October 19, 2005 (#05001175)	Keystone Rd. 44°04′44″N 70°19′29″W	Poland	
46	Kora Temple	Kora Temple	September 11, 1975 (#75000088)	11 Sabattus St. 44°06′01″N 70°12′55″W	Lewiston	
47	Lamb Block	Lamb Block	October 31, 2012 (#12000891)	10 Depot St. 44°28′21″N 70°11′19″W	Livermore Falls	
48	Lamoreau Site		July 13, 1989 (#89000837)	Address Restricted	Auburn	
49	Lewiston City Hall	Lewiston City Hall	October 21, 1976 (#76000085)	Pine and Park Sts. 44°05′42″N 70°12′57″W	Lewiston	
50	Lewiston Commercial Historic District	Lewiston Commercial Historic District	October 4, 2018 (#100003009)	1-393 Lisbon, 157-249 Main, 35 Ash & 103 Park Sts. 44°05′47″N 70°13′02″W	Lewiston	
51	Lewiston Mills and Water Power System Historic District	Lewiston Mills and Water Power System Historic District	July 14, 2015 (#15000415)	Bounded by Androscoggin R., Lisbon, Locust & Bates Sts. 44°05′38″N 70°13′02″W	Lewiston	
52	Lewiston Public Library	Lewiston Public Library	January 31, 1978 (#78000157)	Park and Pine Sts. 44°05′44″N 70°12′58″W	Lewiston	
53	Lewiston Trust and Safe Deposit Company	Lewiston Trust and Safe Deposit Company	April 25, 1986 (#86002283)	46 Lisbon St. 44°05′52″N 70°13′05″W	Lewiston	
54	Lincoln Street Fire Station	Lincoln Street Fire Station	March 23, 2021 (#100006334)	188 Lincoln St. 44°05′32″N 70°13′07″W	Lewiston	
55	Lisbon Falls High School	Lisbon Falls High School	November 7, 2007 (#07001150)	4 Campus Ave. 44°00′05″N 70°03′35″W	Lisbon Falls	
56	Edward Little House	Edward Little House	May 12, 1976 (#76000086)	217 Main St. 44°05′38″N 70°13′35″W	Auburn	
57	Lord Block	Lord Block	April 25, 1986 (#86002284)	379 Lisbon St. 44°05′32″N 70°12′55″W	Lewiston	
58	James C. Lord House	James C. Lord House	July 21, 1978 (#78000158)	497 Main St. 44°06′31″N 70°12′33″W	Lewiston	
59	Lower Lisbon Street Historic District	Lower Lisbon Street Historic District	May 21, 1985 (#85001128)	Lisbon St. between Cedar and Chestnut; 44°05′36″N 70°12′58″W	Lewiston	
60	Lyceum Hall	Lyceum Hall	April 25, 1986 (#86002285)	49 Lisbon St. 44°05′51″N 70°13′06″W	Lewiston	
61	Main Street Historic District	Main Street Historic District	April 21, 1989 (#89000255)	Roughly bounded by Drummond, Main, Elm, and High Sts. 44°05′38″N 70°13′37″W	Auburn	
62	Main Street-Frye Street Historic District	Main Street-Frye Street Historic District	January 23, 2009 (#08001355)	Frye St. and portions of Main St. and College St. 44°06′21″N 70°12′33″W	Lewiston	
63	Maine State Building	Maine State Building	July 18, 1974 (#74000148)	Poland Spring; 44°01′38″N 70°21′44″W	Poland	
64	Maine Supply Company Building	Maine Supply Company Building	April 25, 1986 (#86002286)	415-417 Lisbon St. 44°05′30″N 70°12′53″W	Lewiston	
65	Manufacturer's National Bank	Manufacturer's National Bank	April 25, 1986 (#86002287)	145 Lisbon St. 44°05′46″N 70°13′04″W	Lewiston	
66	Marcotte Nursing Home	Marcotte Nursing Home	December 26, 1985 (#85003128)	100 Campus Ave. 44°06′09″N 70°11′59″W	Lewiston	
67	Dr. Louis J. Martel House	Dr. Louis J. Martel House	January 4, 1983 (#83000445)	122-124 Bartlett St. 44°05′46″N 70°12′39″W	Lewiston	
68	Moyer Site		November 14, 1992 (#92001518)	Address Restricted	Keens Mills	
69	Horace Munroe House	Horace Munroe House	November 10, 1980 (#80000213)	123 Pleasant St. 44°05′12″N 70°13′43″W	Auburn	
70	Nelson Family Farm		December 17, 1992 (#92001707)	End of Shackley Hill Rd., 0.8 miles (1.3 km) north of its junction with State Route 108; 44°24′34″N 70°16′05″W	Livermore	
71	The Norlands	The Norlands	December 30, 1969 (#69000004)	295 Norlands Rd. 44°24′27″N 70°12′39″W	Livermore	
72	Oak Street School	Oak Street School	October 8, 1976 (#76000190)	36 Oak St. 44°05′55″N 70°12′58″W	Lewiston	
73	Odd Fellows Block	Odd Fellows Block	April 25, 1986 (#86002288)	182-190 Lisbon St. 44°05′44″N 70°13′01″W	Lewiston	
74	Osgood Building	Osgood Building	April 25, 1986 (#86002289)	129 Lisbon St. 44°05′47″N 70°13′05″W	Lewiston	
75	Nathaniel Osgood House	Nathaniel Osgood House	March 21, 1985 (#85000608)	State Route 136; 43°55′09″N 70°07′06″W	Durham	
76	Bradford Peck House	Bradford Peck House	February 12, 2009 (#09000010)	506 Main St. 44°06′33″N 70°12′34″W	Lewiston	
77	Samuel Penney House	Samuel Penney House	April 11, 2002 (#02000346)	78 Maple St. 44°06′40″N 70°23′45″W	Mechanic Falls	
78	Pilsbury Block	Pilsbury Block	April 14, 1983 (#83000446)	200-210 Lisbon St. 44°05′44″N 70°13′01″W	Lewiston	
79	Poland Railroad Station	Poland Railroad Station	July 4, 1980 (#80004600)	Harris Hill and Plain Rds. 44°03′42″N 70°23′18″W	Poland	
80	Poland Spring Beach House, (Former)	Poland Spring Beach House, (Former)	September 24, 1999 (#99001191)	State Route 26, 0.1 miles (0.16 km) east of its junction with Skellinger Rd. 44°02′17″N 70°22′30″W	South Poland	
81	Poland Spring Bottling Plant and Spring House	Poland Spring Bottling Plant and Spring House	March 22, 1984 (#84001354)	Ricker Rd. 44°01′44″N 70°21′35″W	Poland	Now a museum.
82	Poland Springs Historic District	Poland Springs Historic District	August 13, 2013 (#13000595)	543 Maine St. 44°02′N 70°22′W	Poland	
83	Quartz Scraper Site		November 14, 1992 (#92001508)	Address Restricted	Keens Mills	
84	Judson Record House	Judson Record House	March 17, 2015 (#15000086)	22 Church St. 44°28′29″N 70°11′20″W	Livermore Falls	Houses Maine's Paper Heritage Museum.
85	Roak Block	Roak Block	January 28, 1982 (#82000738)	144-170 Main St. 44°05′44″N 70°13′30″W	Auburn	
86	William A. Robinson House	William A. Robinson House	April 3, 1993 (#93000204)	11 Forest Ave. 44°05′49″N 70°14′12″W	Auburn	
87	St. Cyril and St. Methodius Church	St. Cyril and St. Methodius Church	May 26, 1977 (#77000061)	Main and High Sts. 43°59′57″N 70°03′32″W	Lisbon Falls	
88	St. Joseph's Catholic Church	St. Joseph's Catholic Church	July 13, 1989 (#89000845)	253 Main St. 44°06′00″N 70°12′58″W	Lewiston	
89	Saint Mary's General Hospital	Saint Mary's General Hospital	December 30, 1987 (#87002191)	318 Sabattus St. 44°06′03″N 70°12′01″W	Lewiston	1902-built Late Gothic Revival hospital now part of large medical complex, near Bates College
90	Sts. Peter and Paul Church	Sts. Peter and Paul Church	July 14, 1983 (#83000447)	27 Bartlett St. 44°05′55″N 70°12′47″W	Lewiston	
91	Savings Bank Block	Savings Bank Block	January 20, 1978 (#78000323)	215 Lisbon St. 44°05′43″N 70°12′56″W	Lewiston	
92	George Seaverns House	George Seaverns House	September 12, 1985 (#85002180)	8 High St. 44°06′37″N 70°23′21″W	Mechanic Falls	
93	Second Callahan Block	Second Callahan Block	April 25, 1986 (#86002290)	282 Lisbon St. 44°05′38″N 70°12′58″W	Lewiston	
94	Shaker Village	Shaker Village	September 13, 1974 (#74000318)	State Route 26; 43°59′22″N 70°21′59″W	Sabbathday Lake	Extends into Cumberland County
95	Araxine Wilkins Sawyer Memorial		June 23, 2025 (#100011942)	371 Sawyer Road; 44°10′24″N 70°07′10″W	Greene	
96	Shiloh Temple	Shiloh Temple	May 12, 1975 (#75000203)	South of Lisbon Falls on the southern bank of the Androscoggin River; 43°58′49″N 70°02′50″W	Durham	
97	Trinity Episcopal Church	Trinity Episcopal Church	March 30, 1978 (#78000159)	Bates and Spruce Sts. 44°05′37″N 70°12′46″W	Lewiston	
98	Turner Cattle Pound	Turner Cattle Pound	August 7, 2009 (#09000592)	Southwestern corner of Gen. Turner Hill Rd. and the Kennebec Trail; 44°16′19″N 70°15′11″W	Turner	
99	Turner Town House	Turner Town House	July 9, 1979 (#79000129)	State Route 117; 44°16′18″N 70°13′30″W	Turner	
100	Union Block	Union Block	April 25, 1986 (#86002291)	21-29 Lisbon St. 44°05′53″N 70°13′07″W	Lewiston	
101	Union Church	Union Church	August 2, 2001 (#01000810)	744 Royalsborough Rd. 43°58′54″N 70°07′45″W	Durham	
102	US Post Office-Lewiston Main	US Post Office-Lewiston Main	May 2, 1986 (#86000879)	49 Ash St. 44°05′47″N 70°12′57″W	Lewiston	
103	Webster Grammar School	Webster Grammar School	September 30, 2010 (#10000806)	95 Hampshire St. 44°06′04″N 70°13′52″W	Auburn	
104	Dr. Milton Wedgewood House	Dr. Milton Wedgewood House	January 10, 1986 (#86000071)	101 Pine St. 44°05′47″N 70°12′44″W	Lewiston	
105	West Auburn School	West Auburn School	March 13, 2020 (#100005097)	740 West Auburn Rd. 44°09′18″N 70°16′47″W	Auburn	
106	West Durham Methodist Church	West Durham Methodist Church	April 22, 2003 (#03000291)	17 Runaround Pond Rd. 43°56′58″N 70°08′59″W	West Durham	
107	Wilson I Site		November 14, 1992 (#92001512)	Address Restricted	East Auburn	
108	Wood Island Site		November 14, 1992 (#92001516)	Address Restricted	Keens Mills	

== Former listings ==
	Name on the Register	Image	Date listed	Date removed	Location	City or town	Description
1	Bergin Block		April 25, 1986 (#86002278)	November 6, 2015	330 Lisbon St. 44°05′36″N 70°13′05″W	Lewiston	Demolished in 1999.
2	Bradford House		December 22, 1978 (#78000154)	July 14, 2015	54-56 Pine St. 44°05′47″N 70°12′52″W	Lewiston	Damaged by fire in 2007 and later demolished.
3	Cowan Mill	Cowan Mill	August 1, 1985 (#85001656)	November 2, 2011	Island Mill St. 44°05′55″N 70°13′18″W	Lewiston	Destroyed by fire in 2009.
4	Cushman Tavern	Cushman Tavern	October 9, 1979 (#79000125)	November 25, 2020	Northeast of Lisbon on State Route 9; 44°03′36″N 70°05′11″W	Lisbon	Demolished.
5	Gilead Railroad Station, Former	Gilead Railroad Station, Former	March 26, 1992 (#92000272)	March 15, 2024	Back St and Bridge St, just off Route 2, Gilead; 44°23′40″N 70°58′21″W	Auburn	Moved to Gilead in January 2011. Building has been relisted at that location.
6	High Street Congregational Church		June 5, 1975 (#75000087)	February 6, 1986	High St.	Auburn	Destroyed by fire on August 14, 1985.
7	Deacon Elijah Livermore House	Deacon Elijah Livermore House	February 24, 1975 (#75000089)	January 15, 2004	6 mi. S of Livermore Falls on Hillman's Ferry Road	Livermore Falls	Destroyed by fire caused by lightning.
8	C. Varney Site		November 14, 1992 (#92001514)	December 30, 1996	Off State Route 117 above the Nezinscot River, southwest of Turner Center; 44°16′00″N 70°14′12″W	Keens Mills	A Late Paleoindian site; almost completely excavated before site destruction in 1998
9	Webster Rubber Company Plant	Webster Rubber Company Plant	October 16, 1989 (#89001701)	August 29, 2024	Greene St. 44°07′12″N 70°06′35″W	Sabattus	Demolished in 2018.
10	Worumbo Mill	Worumbo Mill	October 15, 1973 (#100001674)	October 5, 2017	On the banks of the Androscoggin River; 43°59′37″N 70°04′05″W	Lisbon Falls	Destroyed by fire on July 23, 1987.

== See also ==
- List of National Historic Landmarks in Maine
- National Register of Historic Places listings in Maine
