= Union Church (Durham, Maine) =

Historic church in Maine, United States

- U.S. National Register of Historic Places
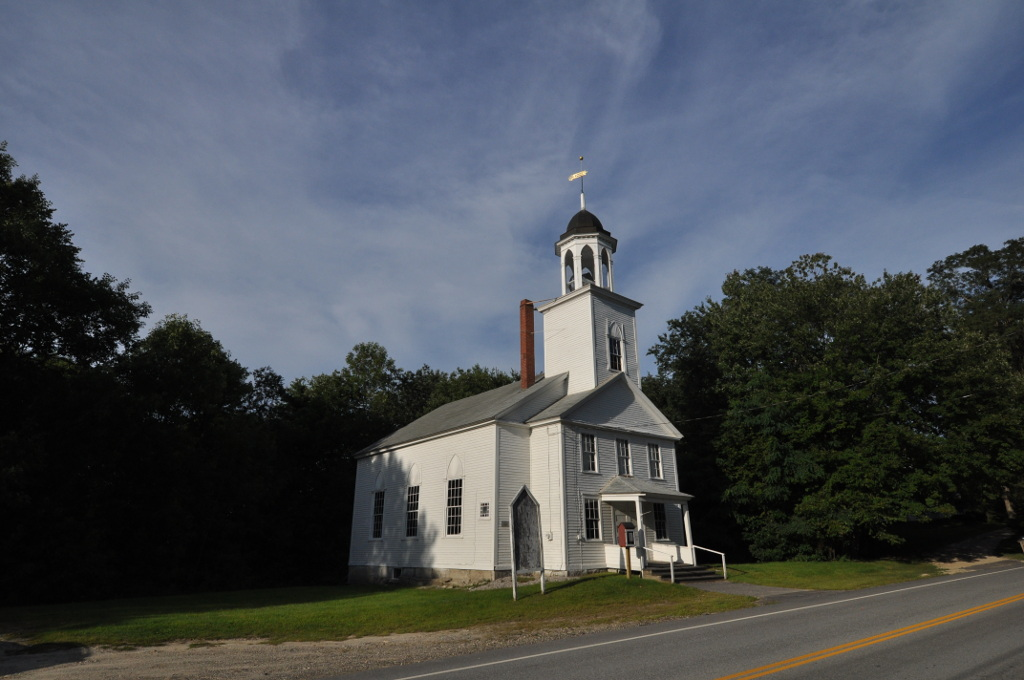

- Location within Maine Location within the United States
- Location: 744 Royalsborough Rd., Durham, Maine
- Coordinates: 43°58′54″N 70°7′45″W
- Built: 1835
- Architectural style: Federal, Gothic Revival
- NRHP reference No.: 01000810
- Added to NRHP: August 2, 2001

The Union Church, also once Durham Town Hall, is a historic civic and religious building at 744 Royalsborough Road in Durham, Maine. Built in 1835 as a multi-denominational church, it is a distinctive local example of late Federal architecture with Greek and Gothic Revival features. From 1922 until 1986, it served as town hall, and now houses the local historical society. The building was listed on the National Register of Historic Places in 2001. The historical building now houses Durhams Historical Societys museum. Open one Saturday a month in warm months. Closed for winter.

== Description and history ==
The former Union Church building is located in the dispersed rural village of Durham, on the north side of Royalsborough Road (Maine State Route 136), about 0.2 miles (0.32 km) west of its junction with Maine State Route 9. It is a single-story wood-frame structure, with a gabled roof, clapboard siding, and a granite foundation. A gabled vestibule projects from the front, with a hip-roofed porch sheltering the main entrance, which is now at the center of that section. A two-stage tower rises, straddling the main roof and that of the vestibule, with an open belfry (housing a Revere bell) and an octagonal cupola above. The vestibule is three bays wide, with sash windows flanking the entrance, and the main block has former entrance locations (now boarded-over pointed-arch openings) on either side of the vestibule section. The interior, despite alterations, retains some of its original Greek Revival trim.

The church was built in 1835 by a Baptist congregation, which allowed other groups to use it for religious services. This group declined in size during the 19th century, and its services ended in 1887. Other groups continued to use it into the early 20th century, but it was abandoned at the time it was deeded to the town in 1922. The town adapted it for use as its town hall, reconfiguring its entrances, and used it for that purpose until 1986. It continues to own the building, which is now occupied by the local historical society.

== See also ==
- National Register of Historic Places listings in Androscoggin County, Maine
