= Charles A. Jordan House =

Historic house in Maine, United States

- U.S. National Register of Historic Places
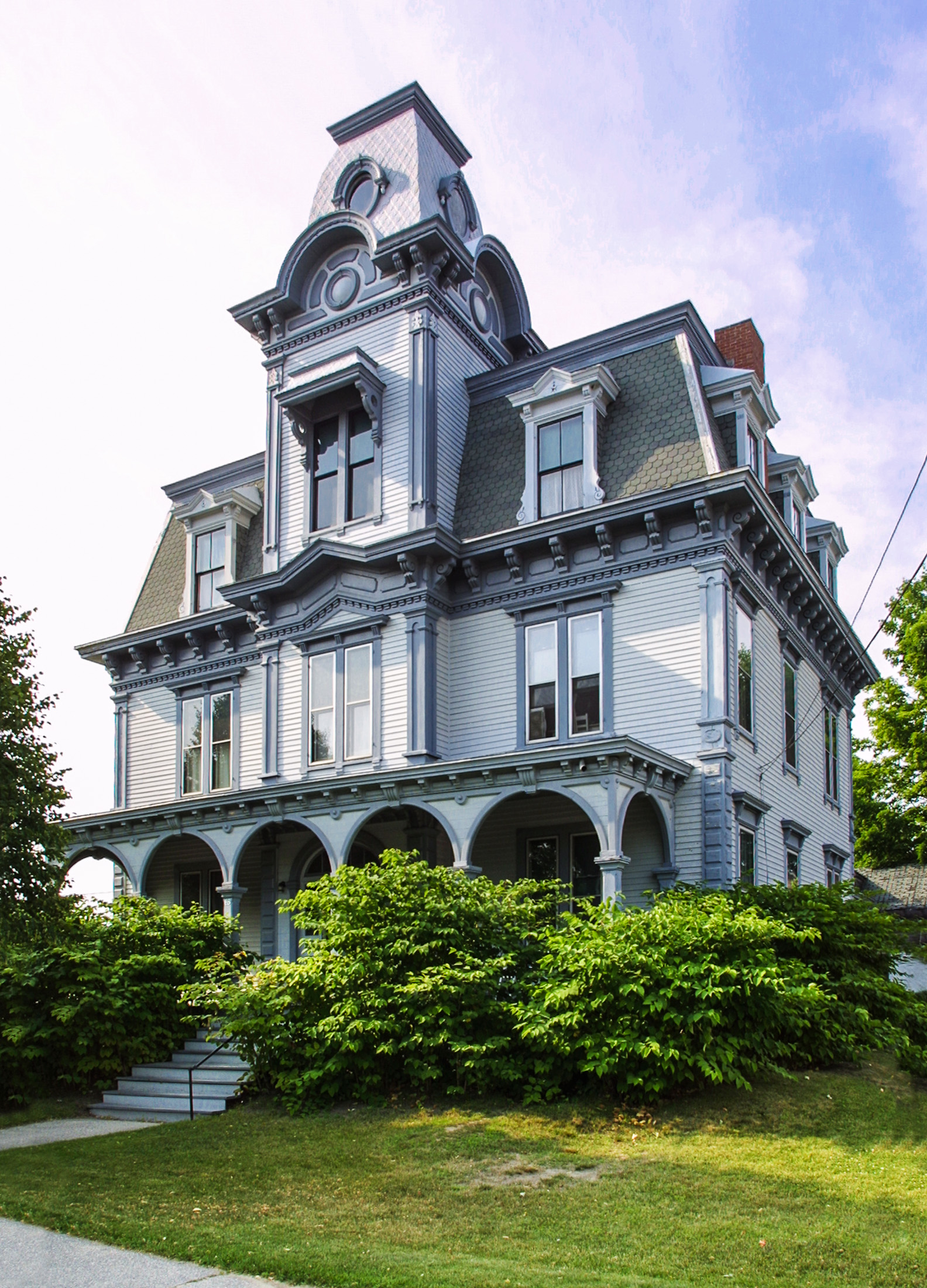
- Charles A. Jordan House in 2003

- Location within Maine Location within the United States
- Location: 63 Academy St., Auburn, Maine
- Coordinates: 44°5′34.5″N 70°13′45″W
- Area: 1 acre (0.40 ha)
- Built: c. 1880
- Architect: Pierce & Jordan
- Architectural style: Second Empire
- NRHP reference No.: 74000147
- Added to NRHP: July 15, 1974

The Charles A. Jordan House is a historic house at 63 Academy Street in Auburn, Maine. Built c. 1880, it is one of the finest examples of Second Empire style in the state. Charles Jordan was a local master builder, who built this house as a residence and as a showcase of his work. The house was listed on the National Register of Historic Places in 1974.

== Description and history ==
The Jordan House is set on the southern fringe of what has long been a fashionable neighborhood of Auburn, just south of its central business district. It is a three-story wood-frame structure, with a mansard roof over the third floor, clapboard siding, and a granite foundation. The main facade faces south, and is three bays wide, with a central projecting bay that rises a full three stories with a mansard roof top. The house has a wealth of exterior decorative woodwork, including an elaborately decorated porch across the front. The main roof and porch cornices are both detailed with brackets, and the window surrounds also feature projecting cornices with small brackets. The corners of the building are quoined on the first floor, and then pilastered to the roof line. The tower features an elaborately hooded window in the third floor, with arched cornices on each side above, and dormer windows in the steeply sloping mansard roof.

Charles A. Jordan was a local master builder, born in 1856, and this house was apparently built c. 1880 as proof of his skill as a builder. Jordan most prominent local buildings included a school building, the Avon Mill, and many local residences.

On September 30, 2018, the house was severely damaged by a fire. The next day, police charged a local man with arson in connection with the fire.

Despite initial reports that the house had been "destroyed," firefighters put out the fire before it could consume the entire house. The Lebrun family, owners of the house since 1945, made immediate investments to stabilize the structure and hold up the roof, but the house remains in dire condition. In 2019, Maine Preservation added the house to its list of Maine's Most Endangered Historic Places, writing that "considerable and timely restoration efforts must be made to halt further deterioration, and to make the building habitable."

== See also ==
- National Register of Historic Places listings in Androscoggin County, Maine
