= Auburn Commercial Historic District =

Historic district in Maine, United States

- U.S. National Register of Historic Places
- U.S. Historic district
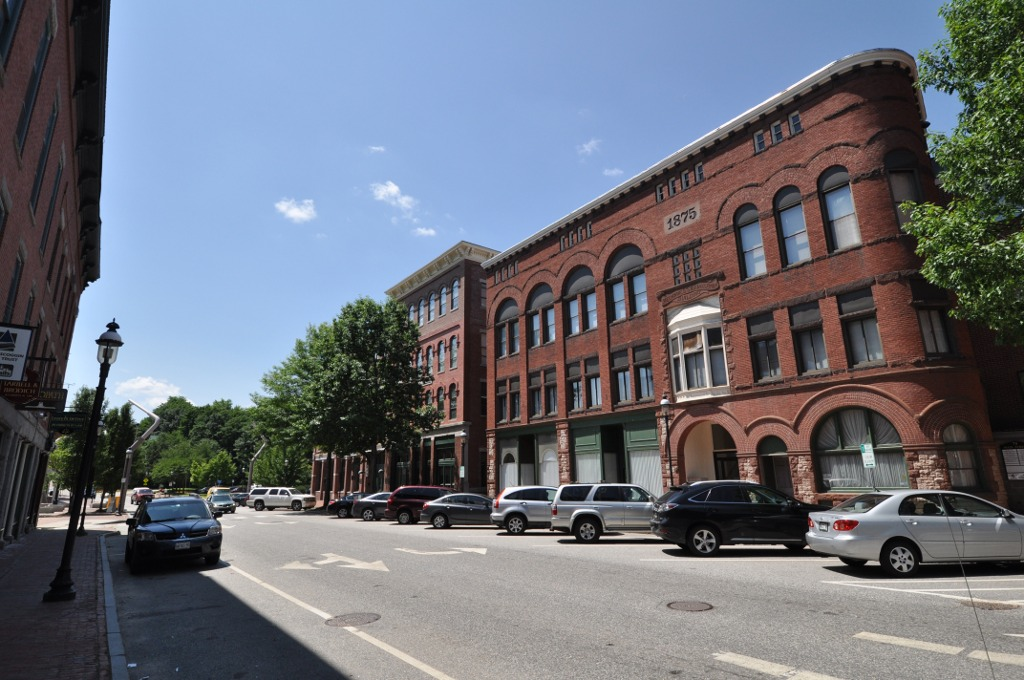
- View of the commercial section of Main Street

- Location within Maine Location within the United States
- Location: Auburn, Maine
- Coordinates: 44°05′50″N 70°13′29″W
- Area: 2.43 acres (0.98 ha)
- Architect: Multiple
- Architectural style: Late Victorian; Colonial Revival
- NRHP reference No.: 14001087
- Added to NRHP: December 29, 2014

The Auburn Commercial Historic District encompasses the main late 19th-century historic downtown area of Auburn, Maine. The twelve buildings in the district represent the city's growth between 1855 and 1902, housing businesses, professional offices and social halls, and also the city's municipal offices. The district was added to the National Register of Historic Places in 2014.

== Description ==
Auburn rose on the banks of the Androscoggin River with the humble beginnings of a log driver's camp in the late 19th century, and did not benefit in the 19th century industrialization the way neighboring Lewiston did, which had a more suitable siting for textile mills. A bridge across the river in 1822-23 spurred some development, including along the roads which are now Main and Court Streets. The arrival of the railroad in 1848, and the choice of Auburn in 1854 to be the seat of the new Androscoggin County cemented the importance of the area where downtown Auburn is now located.

Court Street is the continuation in Auburn of Lewiston's Main Street, and is named for the Androscoggin County Courthouse and Jail, located several blocks west of the bridge on the north side of the street. The commercial historic district is on the south side of this part of the road, running from High Street in the west to Main Street in the east. Main Street parallels the river, with the block between Court and Drummond Streets lined with 19th-century buildings. Notable among this are Auburn's historic and present city halls; the latter, known as Auburn Hall, was designed by Gridley James Fox Bryant and built in 1865. The current city offices stand just to its north on Court Street, in a 2004 building, sensitively designed to blend in with its neighbor by Harriman Associates.

== See also ==
- National Register of Historic Places listings in Androscoggin County, Maine
