= Cushman Tavern =

- Formerly listed on the U.S. National Register of Historic Places
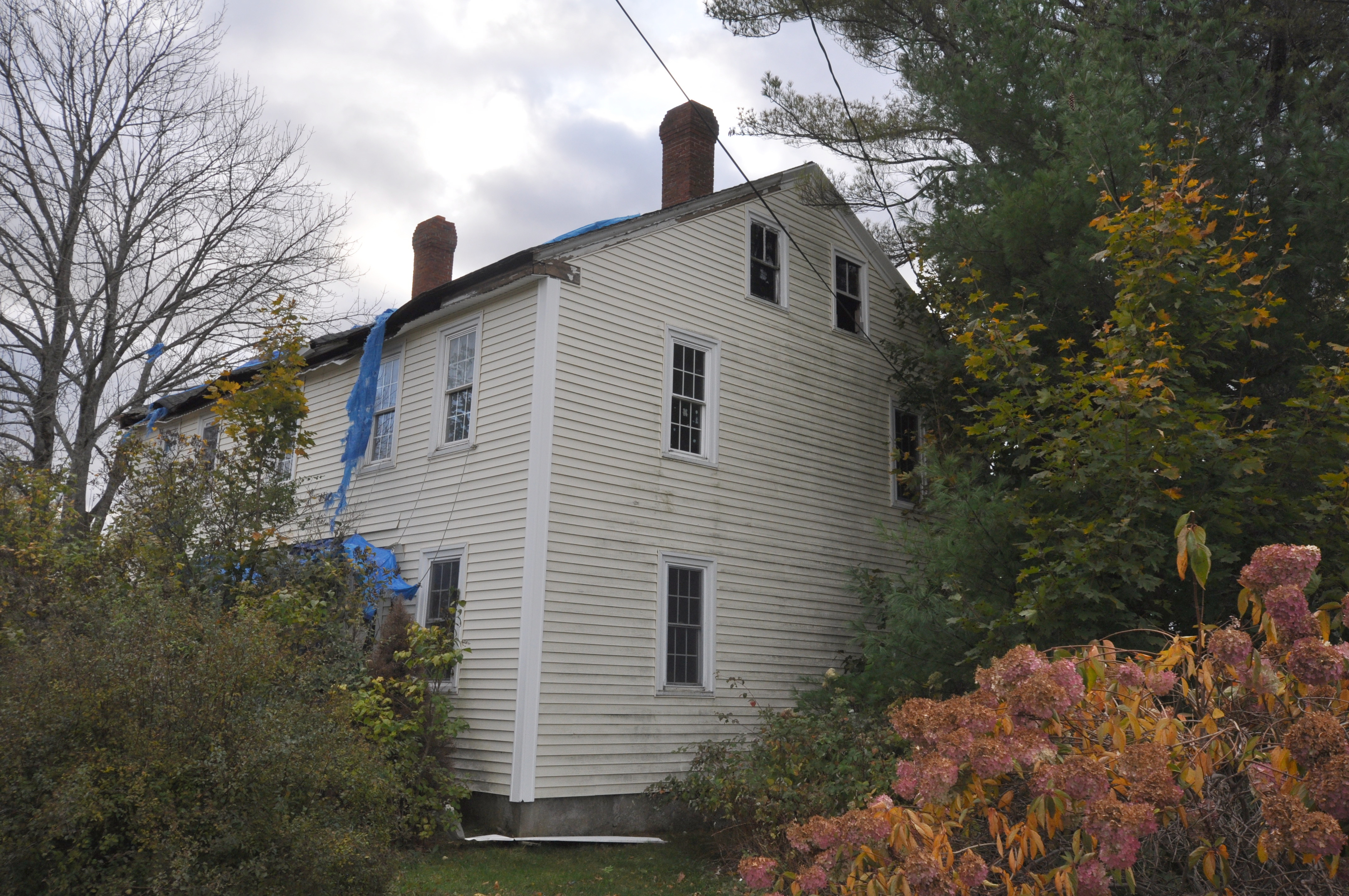
- Photo taken October 2019

- Location within Maine Location within the United States
- Location: ME 9 at Webster Corner Rd., Lisbon, Maine
- Coordinates: 44°3′36″N 70°5′11″W
- Built: 1825
- Architect: Wood, Orison
- Architectural style: Federal
- NRHP reference No.: 79000125

Significant dates
- Added to NRHP: October 9, 1979
- Removed from NRHP: November 25, 2020

Cushman Tavern was an historic tavern (later a private residence) at Maine State Route 9 and Webster Corner Road in Sabattus and Lisbon, Maine. Built c. 1825, this Federal period house was most significant for the folk artwork drawn on the walls of its halls and stairwell by Orison Wood, an itinerant muralist and protégé of Rufus Porter, a well-known exponent of the form. The house was listed on the National Register of Historic Places in 1979. It was demolished in 2019 after standing vacant and deteriorating for several years, and was delisted in 2020.

== Description ==
Cushman Tavern was a large 2½ story wood frame house standing at the southwest corner of Webster Corner Road and Middle Road (Maine State Route 9) on a 0.5-acre (0.20 ha) parcel that straddles the town lines of Lisbon and Sabattus. The main block of the house had a side-gable roof and twin interior chimneys. It was attached by a series of ells (one two stories, the next one) to a barn. The main facade faced west, and had a center entrance flanked by sidelight windows and topped by an entablature that was interrupted by a half-round transom.

The house was built about 1825 by Mr. Dwindal, and was purchased two years later by Samuel Cushman. Cushman and his descendants operated a tavern on the premises for many years; it was eventually converted into a single-family residence. The house's principal feature of significance lay in a series of murals that adorned the hallways of the first and second floors of the main block, and the stairwell that connected them. They were executed by Orison Wood, an itinerant fresco artist known to be active in the area in the second half of the 1820s. Cushman family lore recounts that the painter arrived in 1826, offering his services. Wood was trained by his father in the art of fresco, but he took his ideas about content and form from the writings of Rufus Porter, whose artwork still graces walls across northern New England. These works may have been executed under Porter's supervision.

The building was abandoned in 2014 after the death of one of its owners, and stood abandoned until 2019. Declared unsafe by the town of Sabattus in 2018, it was slated for demolition in late 2019. Some of the artwork has been preserved.

== See also ==
- National Register of Historic Places listings in Androscoggin County, Maine
