= Nelson Family Farm =

Historic house in Maine, United States

- U.S. National Register of Historic Places
- U.S. Historic district
- Location within Maine Location within the United States
- Nearest city: Livermore, Maine
- Coordinates: 44°24′34″N 70°16′5″W
- Area: 58 acres (23 ha)
- Built: 1830
- Architect: Nelson, Alexander
- Architectural style: Greek Revival
- NRHP reference No.: 92001707
- Added to NRHP: December 17, 1992

The Nelson Family Farm is a historic farm property on Shackley Hill Road in Livermore, Maine. It is locally distinctive for the farmhouse, built about 1830 out of rough-split granite after a fire destroyed the Nelson's first homestead. The farm listed on the National Register of Historic Places in 1992.

== Description and history ==
The Nelson Farm is located in the far western part of the mostly rural community of Livermore, on the west side of Shackley Hill Road, north of its junction with Maine State Route 108. The property now consists of 58 acres (23 ha), significantly reduced from more than 100 acres (40 ha) at its height, with stone walls lining some of its borders and field divisions. The property consists of rolling terrain, now mostly wooded, with a portion planted as an apple orchard. The farm complex includes the main house and a detached barn, both 19th-century structures. The house's main block is 1 1/2 stories in height, and is built out of locally sourced granite that has been roughly split, quarry-faced, and laid in irregular courses. Several rough stringcourses project from the wall, and the front facade has a projecting vestibule of stone, the doorway set in an arched opening. The south-facing roof has a wood-frame shed-roof dormer, and a wood-frame ell extends to the rear (west) of the main block. A wood frame barn, built about 1877, stands south of the house.

The Nelson Farm was established in 1816 by Deacon Alexander Nelson on land that his father had purchased the previous year. According to family tradition, Nelson's wife and infant daughter died in a house fire in 1819. He supposedly began construction of the stone house soon afterward, but its Greek Revival styling suggests he may not have begun it until after his marriage to his third wife in 1830. The property remained in the hands of Nelson's descendants until the early 20th century.

== See also ==
- National Register of Historic Places listings in Androscoggin County, Maine
