= Wood Island Site =

- U.S. National Register of Historic Places
- Nearest city: Keens Mills, Maine
- MPS: Androscoggin River Drainage Prehistoric Sites MPS
- NRHP reference No.: 92001516
- Added to NRHP: November 14, 1992

The Wood Island Site, designated site 36.37 by the Maine Archaeological Survey, is a prehistoric archaeological site in the Keens Mills area of Turner, Maine. Located on the Androscoggin River, the site includes evidence of human activity during the Archaic Period (Early to Late) and the Late Woodland period. Finds include ceramic fragments and stone toolmaking debris.

The site was added to the National Historic Register on November 14, 1992.

== See also ==
- National Register of Historic Places listings in Androscoggin County, Maine
