= Webster Rubber Company Plant =

- Formerly listed on the U.S. National Register of Historic Places
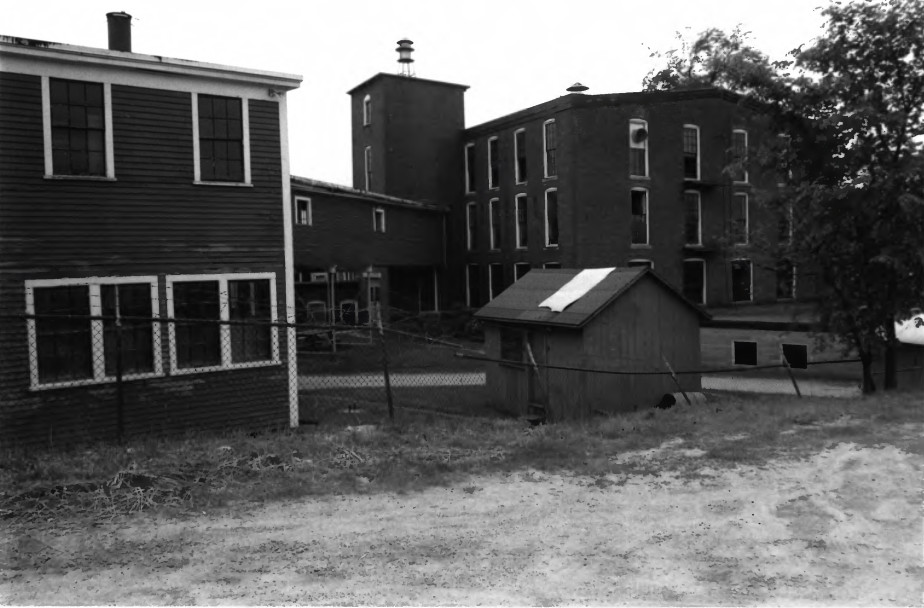
- 1988 photo

- Location within Maine Location within the United States
- Location: Greene St., Sabattus, Maine
- Coordinates: 44°7′12″N 70°6′35″W
- Area: 3 acres (1.2 ha)
- Built: 1869
- Architectural style: Italianate
- Demolished: 2018
- NRHP reference No.: 89001701

Significant dates
- Added to NRHP: October 16, 1989
- Removed from NRHP: August 29, 2024

The Webster Rubber Company Plant, formerly the Webster Woolen Mill No. 1-1/2, is an historic industrial site on Greene Street in Sabattus, Maine. Built in 1869 as a textile mill, it was a fixture of the town's economy well into the 20th century, and is good local example of industrial Italianate architecture. The property was listed on the National Register of Historic Places in 1989. In 2015, the property was vacant, and it was demolished in 2018. It was delisted from the National Register in 2024.

== Description and history ==
The former Webster Rubber Company plant is located on the west side of the village center of the town, between the western bank of the Sabattus River and Greene Street, the main road leading northwest from the village toward Greene. The complex included several connected buildings, dominated by a large three-story brick building with a four-story tower projecting from its center. The building had vernacular Italianate style, with a flat-roof tower, and windows set in segmented-arch openings. The broad gabled roof had a corbelled brick cornice. Additions, principally brick in construction, were added to the main structure. The complex also included three smaller wood frame structures.

The town of Sabbatus was settled in 1774 and incorporated as Webster in 1788. Its main village, called Sebattis [sic], grew as an industrial village at the mouth of Sabattus Pond. In the 1970s the town was reincorporated as Sabattus. The mill was built in 1869, and was the town's second textile mill, known as "Webster Mill No. 1-1/2". In 1922 this complex was acquired by the Pine Tree State Rubber Heal Company, and converted to the production of rubber components of shoes. The mill remained in production until the early 1990s, and stood vacant afterwards. In 2011, the town acquired the property through a tax lien. It was demolished in 2018.

== See also ==
- National Register of Historic Places listings in Androscoggin County, Maine
