= Trinity Episcopal Church (Lewiston, Maine) =

Historic church in Maine, United States

- U.S. National Register of Historic Places
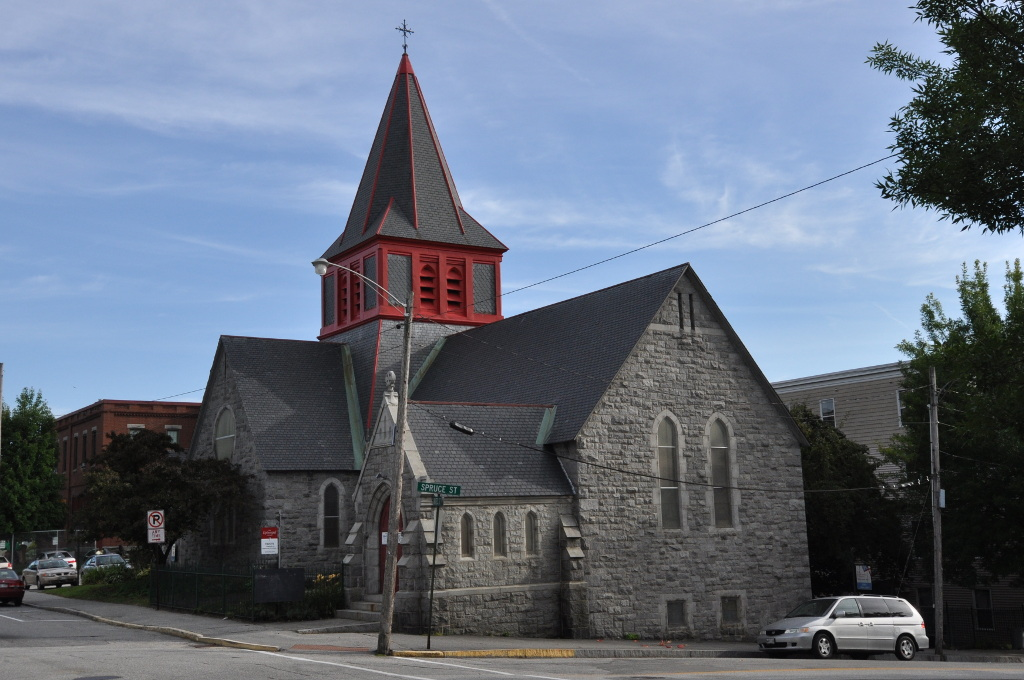

- Location within Maine Location within the United States
- Location: 247 Bates St., Lewiston, Maine
- Coordinates: 44°5′37″N 70°12′46″W
- Area: less than one acre
- Built: 1879
- Architect: Haight, C. C. Co.
- Architectural style: Gothic Revival
- NRHP reference No.: 78000159
- Added to NRHP: March 30, 1978

Trinity Episcopal Church is an historic church building at 247 Bates Street in Lewiston, Maine. It is a modestly sized yet handsomely decorated Gothic Revival building, designed by C.C. Haight of New York City and completed in 1882. The building was listed on the National Register of Historic Places in 1978.

The church reported 29 members in 2015 and 25 members in 2023; no membership statistics were reported in 2024 parochial reports. Plate and pledge income reported for the congregation in 2024 was $58,476. Average Sunday attendance (ASA) in 2024 was 21 persons.

== Architecture and history ==
The Trinity Episcopal Church building stands at the southwest corner of Spruce and Bates Streets in downtown Lewiston, just south of Kennedy Park. It is a single-story stone structure laid out in a cruciform plan, with granite walls and a slate roof. A square tower with a belfry and hipped spire rises at the center of the cross, and a secondary gabled entrance vestibule projects north from the rear of the nave. Windows are generally narrow lancet-arched Gothic windows, with circular rose windows in some of the larger gables.

The Trinity Church parish was organized in 1854, and built its first dedicated sanctuary at Ash and Park Streets in 1859. After outgrowing that space, the parish built this church, on land donated by the Franklin Company. Construction took three years, and the building was consecrated in 1882.

The church continues to be an anchor in the neighborhood. In 2001, it organized the Trinity Jubilee Center, which is a daily soup kitchen and social service agency. The Jubilee Center, now an independent non-profit, is still located in the church building. The parish was also instrumental in the creation of Tree Street Youth and the reopening of the Center for Wisdom's Women. Trinity hosts small concerts and provides bereavement support and memorial services for anyone without a church home, at no charge. The ashes of the deceased can be placed in the memorial garden adjacent to the church building.

== See also ==
- National Register of Historic Places listings in Androscoggin County, Maine
