= Bagley-Bliss House =

Historic house in Maine, United States

- U.S. National Register of Historic Places
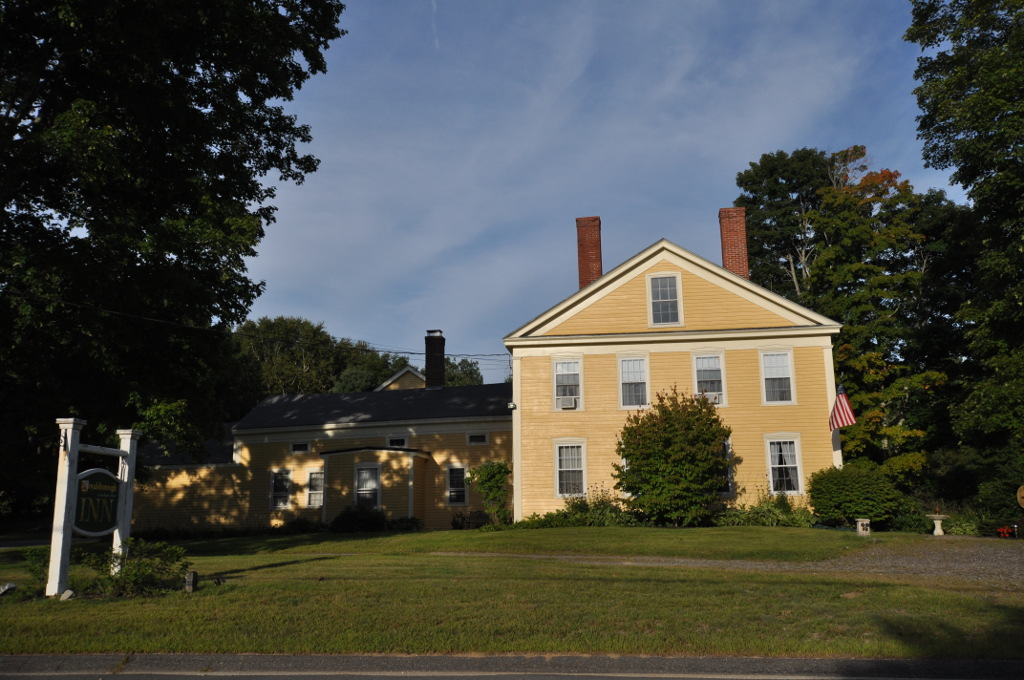

- Location within Maine Location within the United States
- Location: 1290 Royalsborough Rd, Durham, Maine
- Coordinates: 43°56′48″N 70°7′12″W
- Area: 5 acres (2.0 ha)
- Built: 1850
- Architectural style: Greek Revival
- NRHP reference No.: 96000242
- Added to NRHP: March 22, 1996

The Bagley-Bliss House (now the Bliss Farm Inn) is an historic house in Durham, Maine, United States. With a construction date traditionally given as 1772, this Greek Revival house is claimed to be the oldest in Durham, built by one of its early settlers, who also operated an inn on the premises. The house was listed on the National Register of Historic Places on March 22, 1996.

== Description and history ==
The house is set on the east side of a rural stretch of Royalsborough Road (Maine State Route 136), just south of its junction with Quaker Meeting House Road and Rabbit Road. The main block, which faces south, is a large 2 1/2-story wood-framed structure, five bays wide, with a side gable roof, clapboard and shingle siding, and a granite foundation. A single-story ell extends to the rear of the main block, parallel to the road. The main facade is almost symmetrically arranged, with a center entrance that has sidelights and modest Greek Revival trim, but the window above the entrance is slightly off-center. The windows on this side are topped by gabled lintels. The interior features relatively restrained Greek Revival styling, the most elaborate of which is found on the central staircase.

The house is traditionally given a construction date of 1772, making the Durham's oldest house. However, the Greek Revival styling suggests either a later construction date or a major renovation in the 19th century before 1850. It is possible that the attached ell is at least in part the original 1772 structure, and there is some evidence in the main block of material reuse from that period. The main basement has the foundation of a large central chimney, an 18th-century feature not found in the present house. The property was settled in 1770 by O. Israel Bagley, when the area was known as Royalsborough. He was a prominent figure, operating a grist mill, shoe factory, and the community's first store, as well as operating an inn from his house. The property was acquired in 1836 by Charles Bliss, who established a dairy farm, and was probably responsible for the Greek Revival alterations to the house. The house remained in the Bliss family into the 1970s. It was carefully restored in 1982, and now serves as a bed and breakfast inn.

== See also ==
- National Register of Historic Places listings in Androscoggin County, Maine
