= Horace Munroe House =

Historic house in Maine, United States

- U.S. National Register of Historic Places
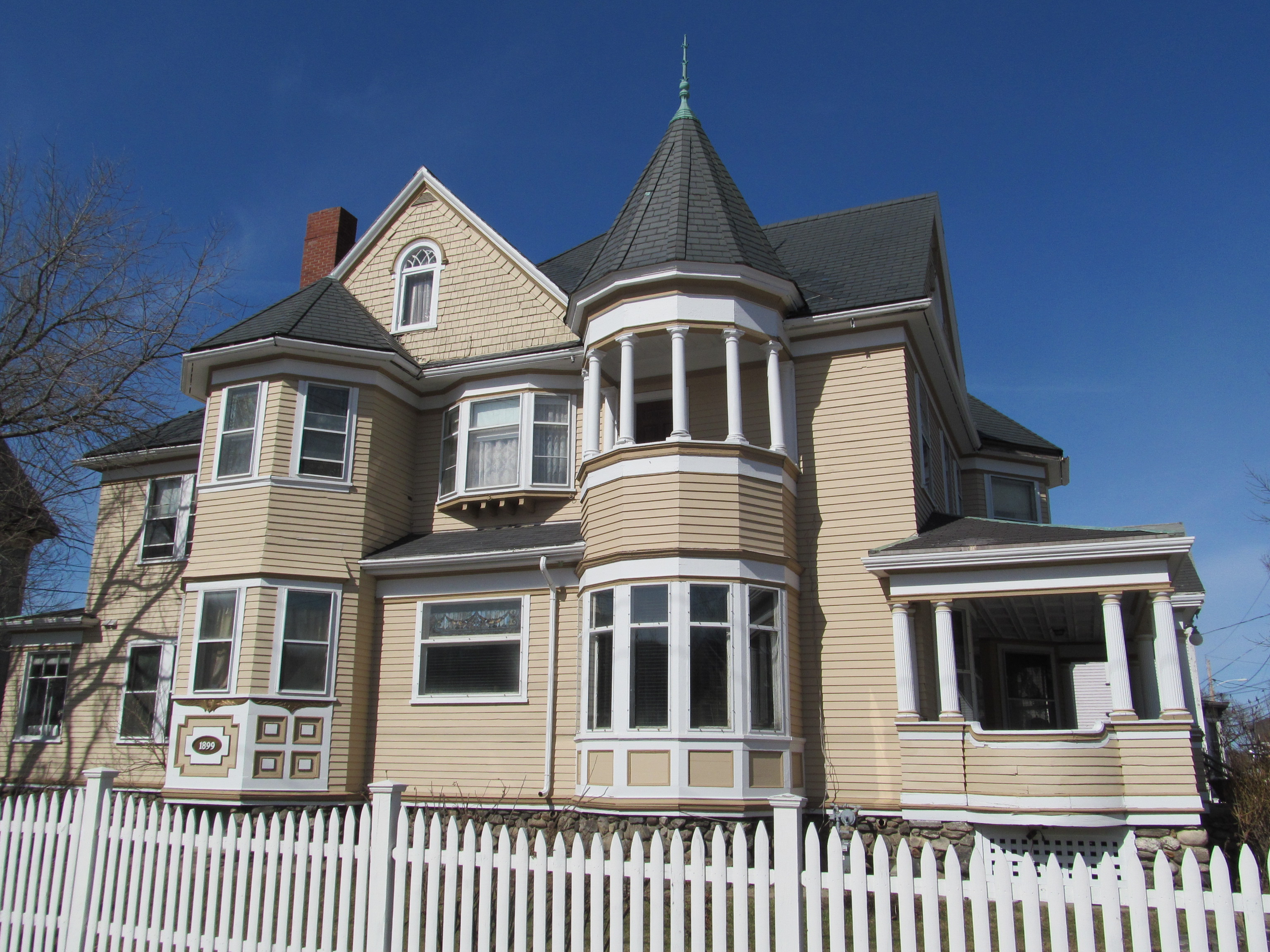
- Horace Munroe House

- Location within Maine Location within the United States
- Location: 123 Pleasant St., Auburn, Maine
- Coordinates: 44°5′44″N 70°13′44″W
- Built: 1899
- Architect: Miller, W. R.
- Architectural style: Queen Anne
- NRHP reference No.: 80000213
- Added to NRHP: November 10, 1980

The Horace Munroe House is an historic house at 123 Pleasant Street in Auburn, Maine. Built in 1899–1900 to a design by William R. Miller, it is one of Auburn's finest examples of Queen Anne architecture. It was listed on the National Register of Historic Places in 1980. It is now the Munroe Inn, a bed and breakfast inn.

== Description and history ==
The Munroe House is located in a residential area just southwest of downtown Auburn, at the northwest corner of Pleasant and Drummond Streets. It is a rambling 2 1/2-story wood-frame structure, with a roughly rectangular shape that is somewhat obscured by the number of gables, porches, and projecting sections that characterize the Queen Anne style of architecture. A single-story hip-roofed porch extends across the front, supported by groups of Doric columns. A gabled section projects slightly above the stairs leading up to it from Pleasant Street. Two turret-like sections project from the left side of the house (facing Drummond), one with an open second floor porch, with Doric columns supporting a garlanded entablature.

The house was designed by Lewiston architect William R. Miller, and was built in 1899-1900 for the mother of Horace Munroe, and was the latter's home for much of his life. Munroe's father Noble was one of the founders of the shoe manufacturing industry in Auburn, one of its dominant businesses of the period. The house was sold out of the family in the 1950s, and was run for a time as a boarding house. It has been used intermittently as a bed and breakfast inn since 1999.

== See also ==
- National Register of Historic Places listings in Androscoggin County, Maine
