= Lamoreau Site =

- U.S. National Register of Historic Places
- Location: Auburn, Maine
- NRHP reference No.: 89000837
- Added to NRHP: July 13, 1989

The Lamoreau Site, also known as the Maine Archaeological Survey Site 23.13 is a Precontact Native American archaeological site in Auburn, Maine. It is located on the grounds of the Auburn/Lewiston Municipal Airport. The site was listed on the National Register of Historic Places in 1989. It is named for its discoverer, Henry Lamoreau.

== Description ==
The Lamoreau Site is one of a number of archaeological sites found on the property of Auburn/Lewiston Municipal Airport, or on adjacent commercial properties. Several of them were completely excavated and destroyed by subsequent construction of airport infrastructure. This site is located on the banks of Moose Brook in an outlying area of the airport. It is a habitation site, located across the brook from one of the airport's most important sites, the Michaud Site, which was one of those destroyed. The geography of the two sites is similar, consisting of a sandy plain formed by the withdrawal of glaciers about 10,000 years ago. The sand was then blown to produce dunes, among which the prehistoric occupants lived.

The site was formally investigated in the 1980s, and the principal finds are stone artifacts. These include fluted projectile points, waste from stone tool work (debitage), and small channel scrapers. Most of these materials are made from stone that is either rhyolite from Mount Jasper in New Hampshire, or Munsungan chert from northern Maine.

== See also ==
- National Register of Historic Places listings in Androscoggin County, Maine
