= Quartz Scraper Site =

- U.S. National Register of Historic Places
- Nearest city: Keens Mills, Maine
- MPS: Androscoggin River Drainage Prehistoric Sites MPS
- NRHP reference No.: 92001508
- Added to NRHP: November 14, 1992

The Quartz Scraper Site, designated 36.29 by the Maine Archaeological Survey, is a prehistoric archaeological site in the Keens Mills area of Turner, Maine. The site has yielded evidence of human habitation, including contact-period ceramic fragments and European trade beads.

The site was listed on the National Register of Historic Places in 1992.

== See also ==
- National Register of Historic Places listings in Androscoggin County, Maine
