= Big Ram Site =

- U.S. National Register of Historic Places
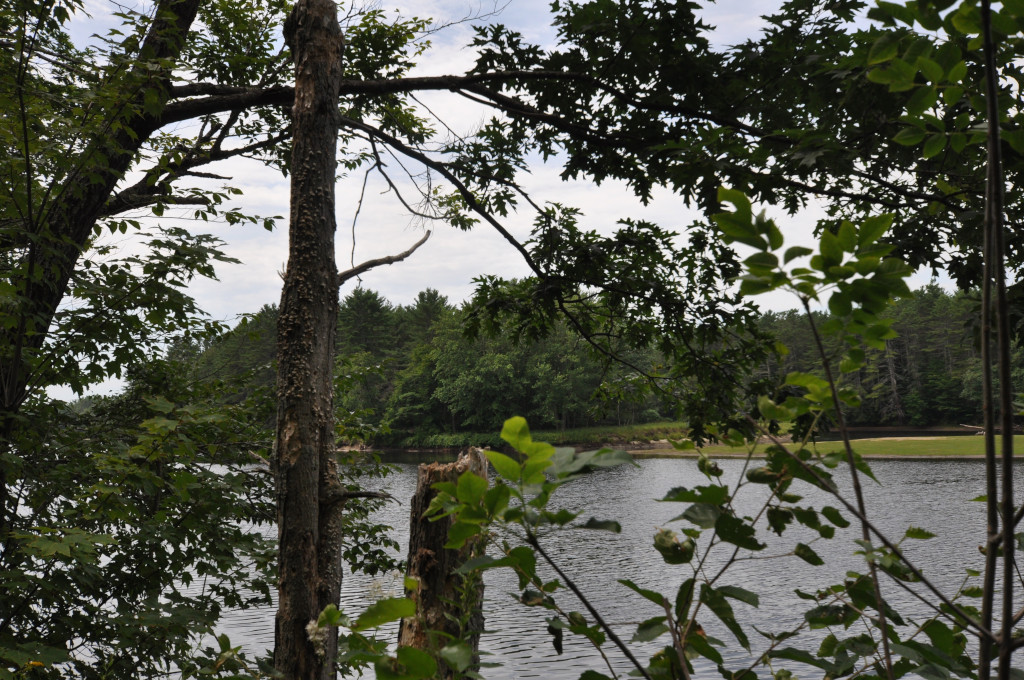
- Big Ram Island, as seen from the mainland in Leeds

- Location within Maine Location within the United States
- Nearest city: Turner, Maine
- MPS: Androscoggin River Drainage Prehistoric Sites MPS
- NRHP reference No.: 92001515
- Added to NRHP: November 14, 1992

The Big Ram Site, designated Site 36.32 by the Maine Archeological Survey, is a prehistoric archaeological site on Ram Island, an island in the Androscoggin River in Turner, Maine. The site, excavated in 1987, yielded ceramic and other artifacts dating to two periods of occupation, c. 100–600 CE, and c. 1400–1700 CE. The site was listed on the National Register of Historic Places in 1992.

== Description ==
The Big Ram Site is located on Ram Island, one of a small cluster of islands in the Androscoggin River roughly 1 mile (1.6 km) downriver from Maine State Route 219. The soil of the wooded island is sandy, and is subject to occasional flooding that leaves additional deposits. The site on the island was identified by survey in 1987, at which time it was subjected to test excavations. In addition to artifacts found at the site, there is evidence of at least one habitation layer from which charcoal and fire-cracked rocks were removed. Stone artifacts recovered include flakes of quartz and rhyolite, while burnt seeds and ceramic pottery fragments were also found. The ceramics, which were not datable in the present context, are consistent with finds from other, datable sites representing two separate periods of occupation. The first, a find with a smooth surface and dentate markings, is similar to finds dated elsewhere to the Middle Woodland Period (c. 100–600 CE), while another fragment, with an incised exterior, is similar to Late Woodland or early contact-period finds (c. 1300–1750 CE).

The site is significant as a well-preserved, well stratified site containing clear evidence of occupation during two periods.

== See also ==
- National Register of Historic Places listings in Androscoggin County, Maine
