= Bergin Block =

- Formerly listed on the U.S. National Register of Historic Places
- Location within Maine Location within the United States
- Location: 330 Lisbon Street, Lewiston, Maine
- Coordinates: 44°5′36″N 70°13′5″W
- Built: 1912
- Architectural style: Classical Revival
- MPS: Lewiston Commercial District MRA
- NRHP reference No.: 86002278

Significant dates
- Added to NRHP: April 25, 1986
- Removed from NRHP: November 6, 2015

The Bergin Block was an historic commercial building in Lewiston, Maine.

The block was built in 1912 and added to the National Register of Historic Places in 1986. It was demolished in 1999.

== See also ==
- National Register of Historic Places listings in Androscoggin County, Maine
