= Excelsior Grange =

- Excelsior Grange #5
- U.S. National Register of Historic Places
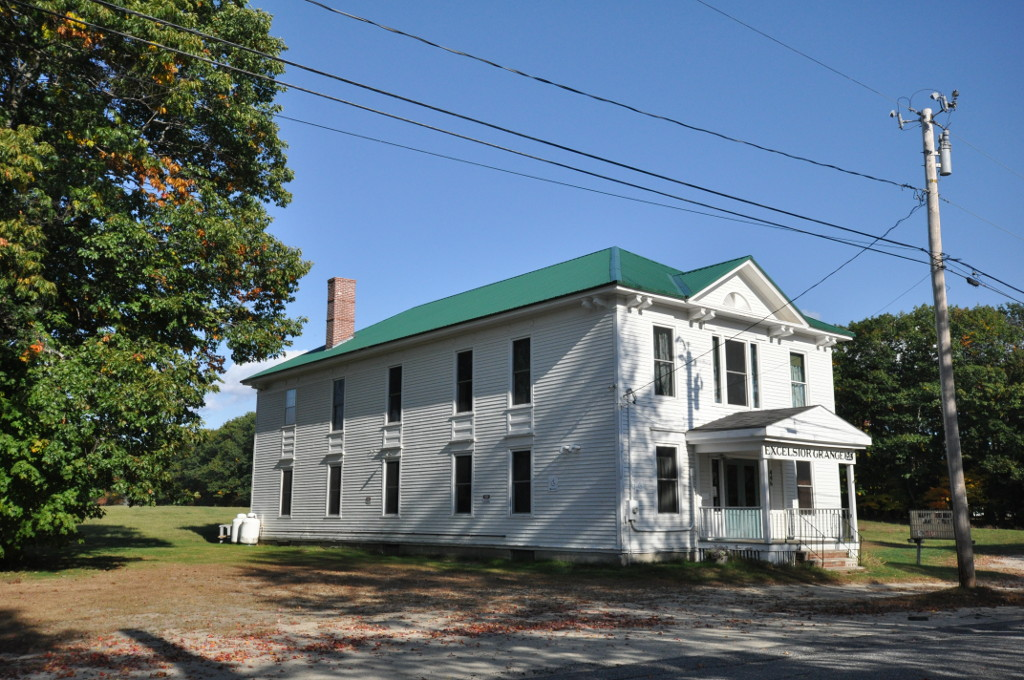

- Location within Maine Location within the United States
- Location: 446 Harris Hill Rd., Poland, Maine
- Coordinates: 44°4′57″N 70°21′55″W
- Area: less than one acre
- Built: 1914
- Architect: Harry Wilkinson
- Architectural style: Georgian Revival
- NRHP reference No.: 16000137
- Added to NRHP: April 5, 2016

The Excelsior Grange is a historic Grange hall at 446 Harris Hill Road in Poland, Maine. It was built in 1914 for chapter 5 of the state Grange, and continues to be maintained by that organization as a public community resource. It was listed on the National Register of Historic Places in 2016.

== Description and history ==
The Excelsior Grange hall is located in a rural area of northeastern Poland, on the north side of Harris Hill Road, just east of its junction with Poland Corner Road. It is a long rectangular wood-frame structure, with a hip roof, clapboard siding, and a concrete foundation. The short front facade is symmetrically arranged, with three bays across. The entrance is at the center of the ground floor, with flanking sidelight windows. A single-story gable-roofed porch shelters the entrance, supported by square posts. Inside, the ground floor houses a dining room and kitchen behind the lobby, with an auditorium space on the second floor.

The Excelsior Grange was organized in 1874, and was the fifth chapter established in the state. The chapter's first hall was destroyed by fire, and this hall was built in 1914 as a replacement. It is one of the few Grange halls in the state known to be designed by an architect, in this case Harry Wilkinson, who had trained in the practice of George M. Coombs. The hall continues to serve as a major local community resource, hosting dinners and other social events, theatrical productions, as well as civic functions.

== See also ==
- National Register of Historic Places listings in Androscoggin County, Maine
