= Captain Holland House =

Historic house in Maine, United States

- U.S. National Register of Historic Places
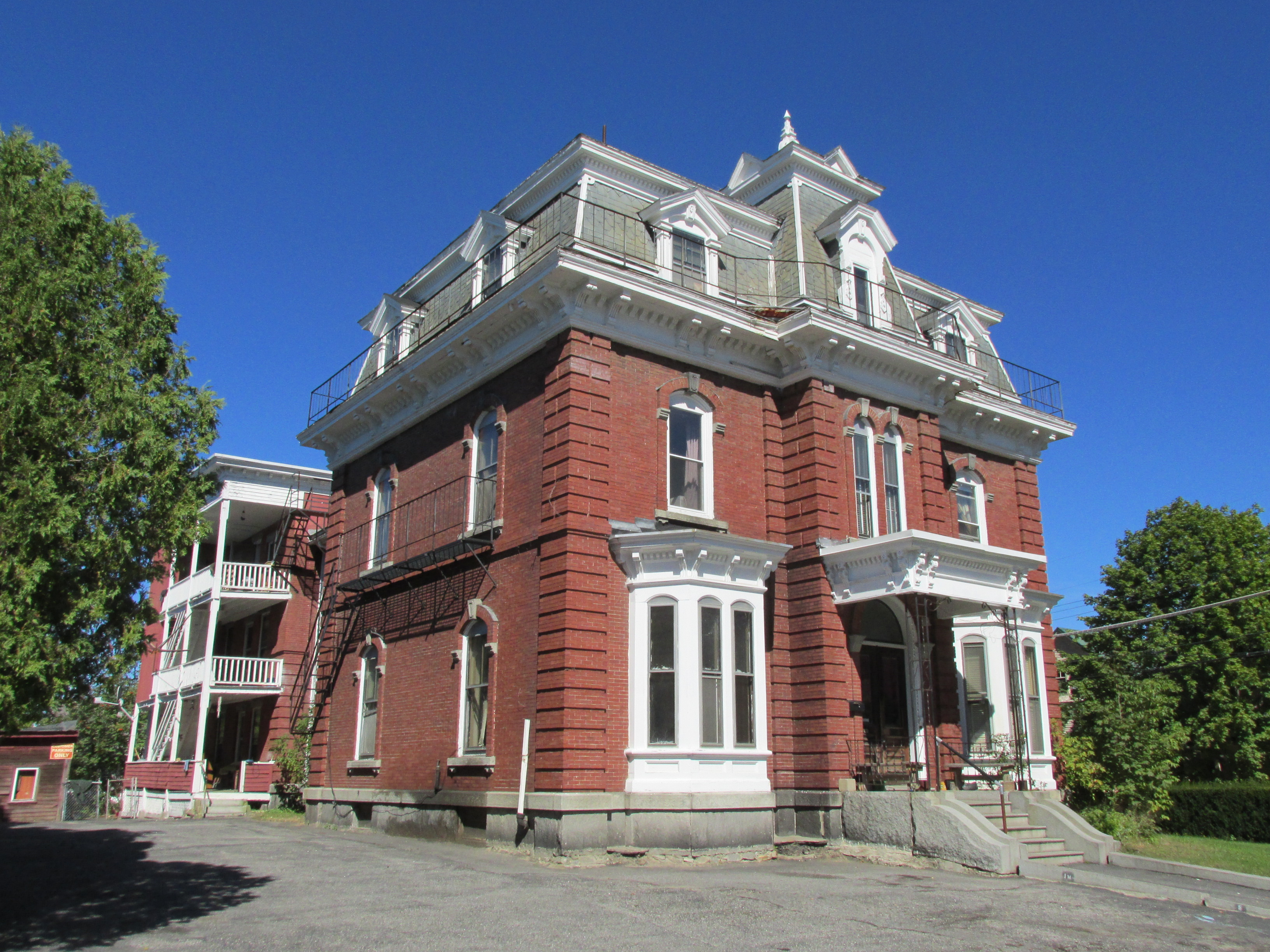
- Captain Holland House

- Location within Maine Location within the United States
- Location: 142 College St., Lewiston, Maine
- Coordinates: 44°6′10″N 70°12′37″W
- Area: less than one acre
- Built: 1872
- Architectural style: Second Empire
- NRHP reference No.: 85000609
- Added to NRHP: March 21, 1985

The Captain Holland House is an historic house in Lewiston, Maine. Built in 1872, this three-story brick building is a fine local example of the Second Empire style. It was built by Daniel Holland, one of the city's leading industrialists. The house was listed on the National Register of Historic Places in 1985.

== Description and history ==
The Holland House is set at the western corner of College and Holland Streets, in a residential neighborhood between Lewiston's downtown area and the campus of Bates College. It is three stories tall, and three bays in width, with a dormered mansard roof providing the third story. A central projecting pavilion, which houses the main entrance, is topped by a truncated pyramidal roof, with a small gable and spire above. All of the front corner sections are finished in a brick version of quoining. The center entrance is topped by a round-arch fanlight and sheltered by an elaborate dentillated and bracketed portico. The flanking bays have polygonal projecting bays on the first level, with narrow windows topped by segmented arches, and similar dentillation and bracketing. Above the main entrance are a pair of narrow round-arch windows with stone keystones, while the windows above the side bays are wider and set in segmented-arch openings. The dormers in the mansard roof section are gabled and also elaborately treated.

The house was built in 1872, and is one of Lewiston's fine examples of Second Empire architecture. Daniel Holland, for whom it was built, was a leading local industrial with interests in lumber and real estate. He served on Maine's Governor's Council in 1868, and also two terms in the state senate.

== See also ==
- National Register of Historic Places listings in Androscoggin County, Maine
