= Danville Junction Grange =

- Danville Junction Grange #65
- U.S. National Register of Historic Places
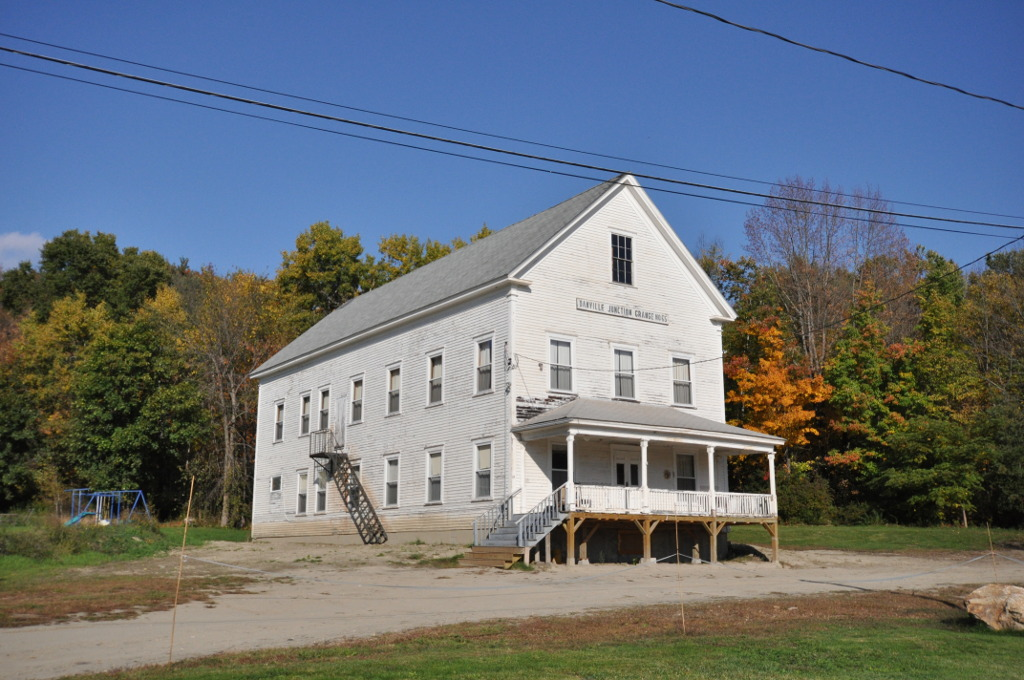

- Location within Maine Location within the United States
- Location: 15 Grange St., Auburn, Maine
- Coordinates: 44°1′22″N 70°15′53″W
- Area: less than one acre
- Built: 1898
- Architectural style: Late Victorian
- NRHP reference No.: 16000138
- Added to NRHP: April 5, 2016

The Danville Junction Grange is a historic Grange hall at 15 Grange Street in the Danville section of Auburn, Maine. It was built in 1898 for chapter 65 of the state Grange, and continues to be maintained by that organization as a public community resource. It was listed on the National Register of Historic Places in 2016.

== Description and history ==
The Danville Junction Grange hall is located in southern Auburn, on the north side of Grange Street in the village of Danville Junction. It is a long rectangular wood frame structure, with a gabled roof, clapboard siding, and a two-part foundation of brick and concrete. The short front facade is symmetrically arranged, with three bays across. The entrance is at the center of the ground floor, with a double door modestly trimmed, with sash windows filling the remaining bays, including one at the attic level. A single-story hip-roofed porch extends across the front, supported by chamfered square posts. Inside, the ground floor houses a dining room and kitchen behind the lobby, with an auditorium space on the second floor.

The Danville Junction Grange was organized in 1874, and is one of six to be established in Auburn. It first met in a local school, building its hall was built between 1898 and 1901 (partly reflected in the different foundations for its sections). Since that time, it has served a major local community resource, hosting dinners and other social events, theatrical productions, as well as civic functions, including meetings with municipal officials.

== See also ==
- National Register of Historic Places listings in Androscoggin County, Maine
