= Holland–Drew House =

Historic house in Maine, United States

- U.S. National Register of Historic Places
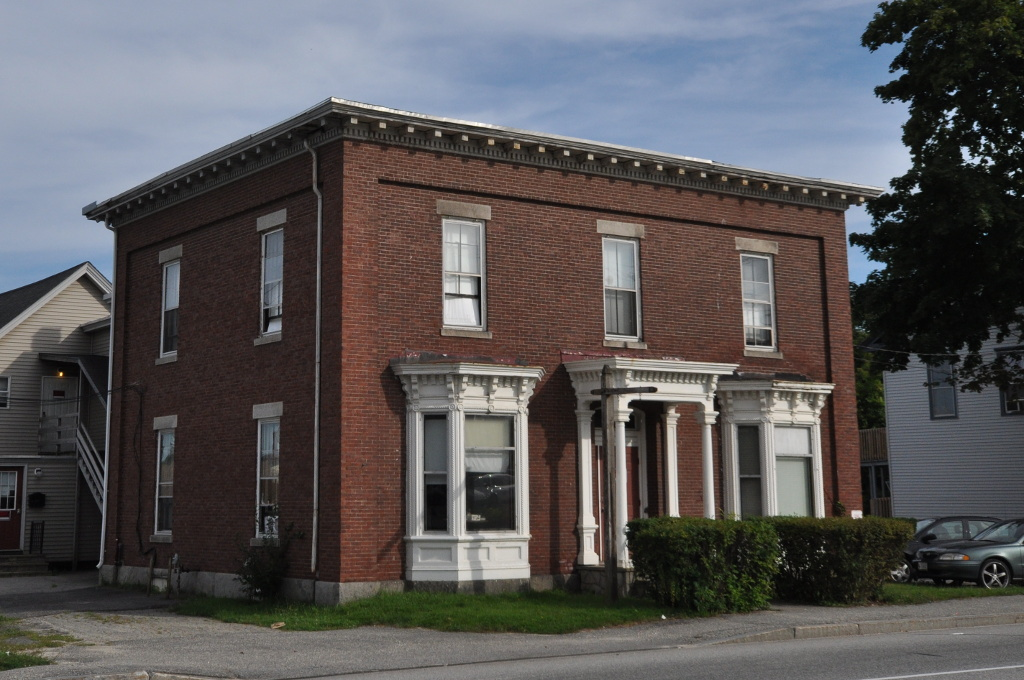

- Location within Maine Location within the United States
- Location: Lewiston, Maine
- Coordinates: 44°6′12″N 70°12′44″W
- Area: less than one acre
- Built: 1854
- Architectural style: Italianate
- NRHP reference No.: 78000324
- Added to NRHP: December 22, 1978

The Holland–Drew House is a historic house at 377 Main Street in Lewiston, Maine. Built in 1854, it is a high-quality local example of Italianate architecture executed in brick. It is also notable for some of its owners, who were prominent in the civic and business affairs of the city. The house was listed on the National Register of Historic Places in 1978.

== Description and history ==
The Holland–Drew House is located at the southeast corner of Main and Holland Streets, northeast of Lewiston's central business district. It is a two-story brick structure, with a low-pitch hip roof that has a denticulated cornice. The front (west-facing) facade is three bays wide, with the center entrance sheltered by a portico supported by round columns in front and pilasters in back. The portico has a bracketed and dentillated cornice, details repeated on flanking single-story bay windows. Other windows on the house have granite sills and lintels. The interior is well preserved, with stained glass windows depicting Henry Wadsworth Longfellow and Wolfgang Amadeus Mozart. A wood-frame ell extends to the rear, continuing the Italianate exterior features, and joining the house to carriage house.

The house was built in 1854 for Daniel Holland, then one of Lewiston's leading lumbermen and real estate developers. He served on the Maine Governor's Council in 1868, and served two terms in the state senate. Its second prominent owner was Franklin Drew, a magistrate who also served in the state legislature and as Secretary of State. He also commanded a regiment of volunteers during the American Civil War.

== See also ==
- National Register of Historic Places listings in Androscoggin County, Maine
