= F. M. Jordan House =

Historic house in Maine, United States

- U.S. National Register of Historic Places
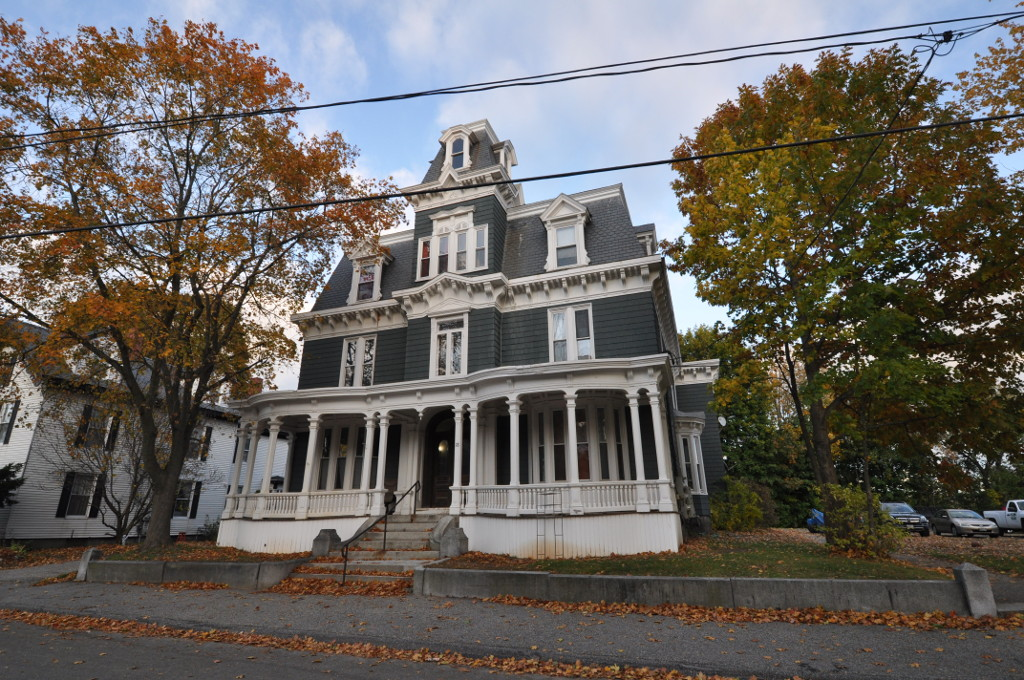

- Location within Maine Location within the United States
- Location: 18 Laurel St., Auburn, Maine
- Coordinates: 44°5′24″N 70°13′31″W
- Area: 1 acre (0.40 ha)
- Built: 1881
- Architect: Charles Sumner Frost
- Architectural style: Second Empire
- NRHP reference No.: 14001088
- Added to NRHP: December 29, 2014

The F. M. Jordan House is a historic house at 18 Laurel Street in Auburn, Maine. Built in 1881, it is one of the finest examples of Second Empire style in the state. It was built by Charles Jordan, a local master builder and distant relative of Francis Jordan, for whom it was built. The house was listed on the National Register of Historic Places in 2014. It is now subdivided into apartments.

== Description and history ==
The F.M. Jordan House stands in a residential area south of Auburn's downtown, on the east side of Laurel Street. It is a 2 1/2-story wood-frame structure, with a mansard roof providing a full third floor. A three-story tower, also topped by a mansard roof, projects from the center of the west-facing front facade. The roof eaves are studded with brackets and dentil moulding, and the transition between the roof faces has a shallow cornice. Dormers project from the roof, with fully pedimented dormers and flanking decorative woodwork. An ornate single-story porch extends across the front facade, with rounded projecting sections flanking the main stairs. The interior retains significant original plaster and woodwork, despite its conversion into apartments. A period carriage house, set behind the house, has also been converted to apartments.

The house was built in 1881 for Francis M. Jordan, a principal owner of the Auburn Aqueduct Company, whose facilities greatly improved the city's firefighting infrastructure. He afterward expanded into banking, and funded early electric companies in the city. His house is the first known commission of Charles Sumner Frost, a Maine native whose first professional position was as a draftsman for the Boston architectural firm Peabody and Stearns, and who later achieved national notice for his work in Chicago.

== See also ==
- National Register of Historic Places listings in Androscoggin County, Maine
