= Judson Record House =

Historic house in Maine, United States

- U.S. National Register of Historic Places
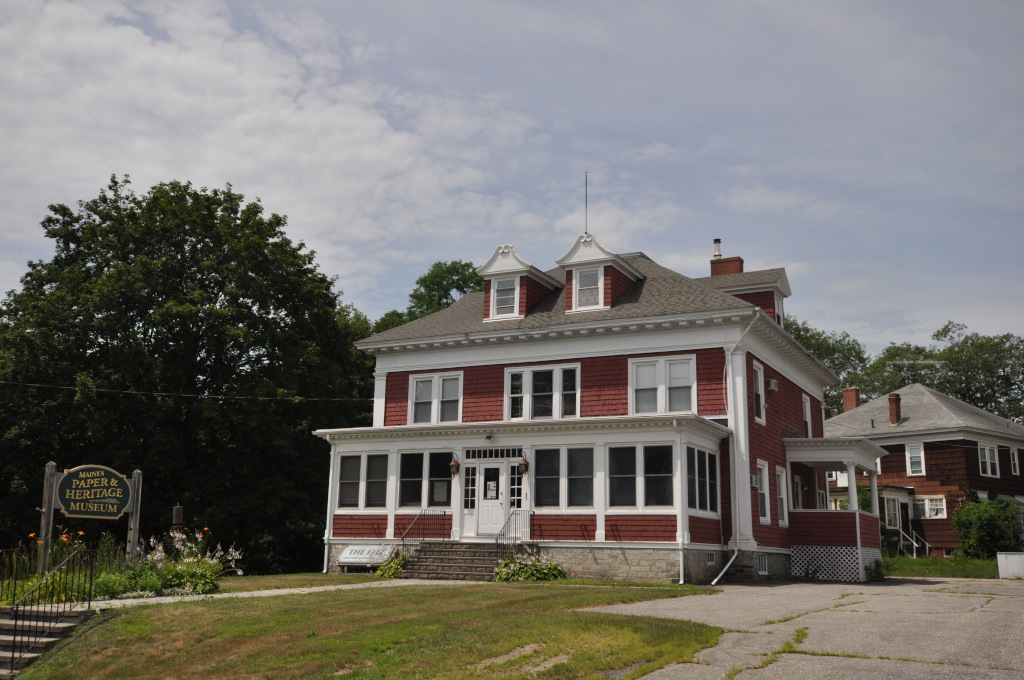

- Location within Maine Location within the United States
- Location: 22 Church St., Livermore Falls, Maine
- Coordinates: 44°28′29″N 70°11′20″W
- Area: less than one acre
- Built: 1907
- Architect: Coombs and Gibbs
- Architectural style: Colonial Revival
- NRHP reference No.: 15000086
- Added to NRHP: March 17, 2015

The Judson Record House is a historic house at 22 Church Street in Livermore Falls, Maine. Built in 1907 for a prominent local industrialist, it is a fine local example of Colonial Revival architecture. It presently houses Maine's Paper and Heritage Museum. It was added to the National Register of Historic Places in 2015.

== Description and history ==
The Judson Record House stands in the town center of Livermore Falls, on the northwest side of Church Street. It is a 2 1/2-story wood-frame structure, with a hip roof, wooden shingle siding, and a granite foundation. The roof is pierced by gabled dormers, with the pair facing front featuring broken scrolled pediments. The front facade is symmetrical, with a single-story enclosed porch extending across its width. Both the porch and the main building have corner pilasters, with pilasters also present between pairs of windows on the porch. They rise to an entablature and modillioned cornice. The main entrance is at the center of the porch, flanked by wide sidelight windows, and a transom window above with ten small lights. The building interior retains high quality original workmanship.

The house was built in 1907 for Judson A. Record, a businessman who operated locally important pulp and papermaking businesses. The house was designed by the prominent Maine architecture firm of George M. Coombs and Eugene Gibbs. From 1917 until the 1970s, it was used as housing for managers of the local papermaking businesses, and then as office space. Since 2007 it has housed Maine's Paper and Heritage Museum.

== See also ==
- National Register of Historic Places listings in Androscoggin County, Maine
