= College Block-Lisbon Block =

- U.S. National Register of Historic Places
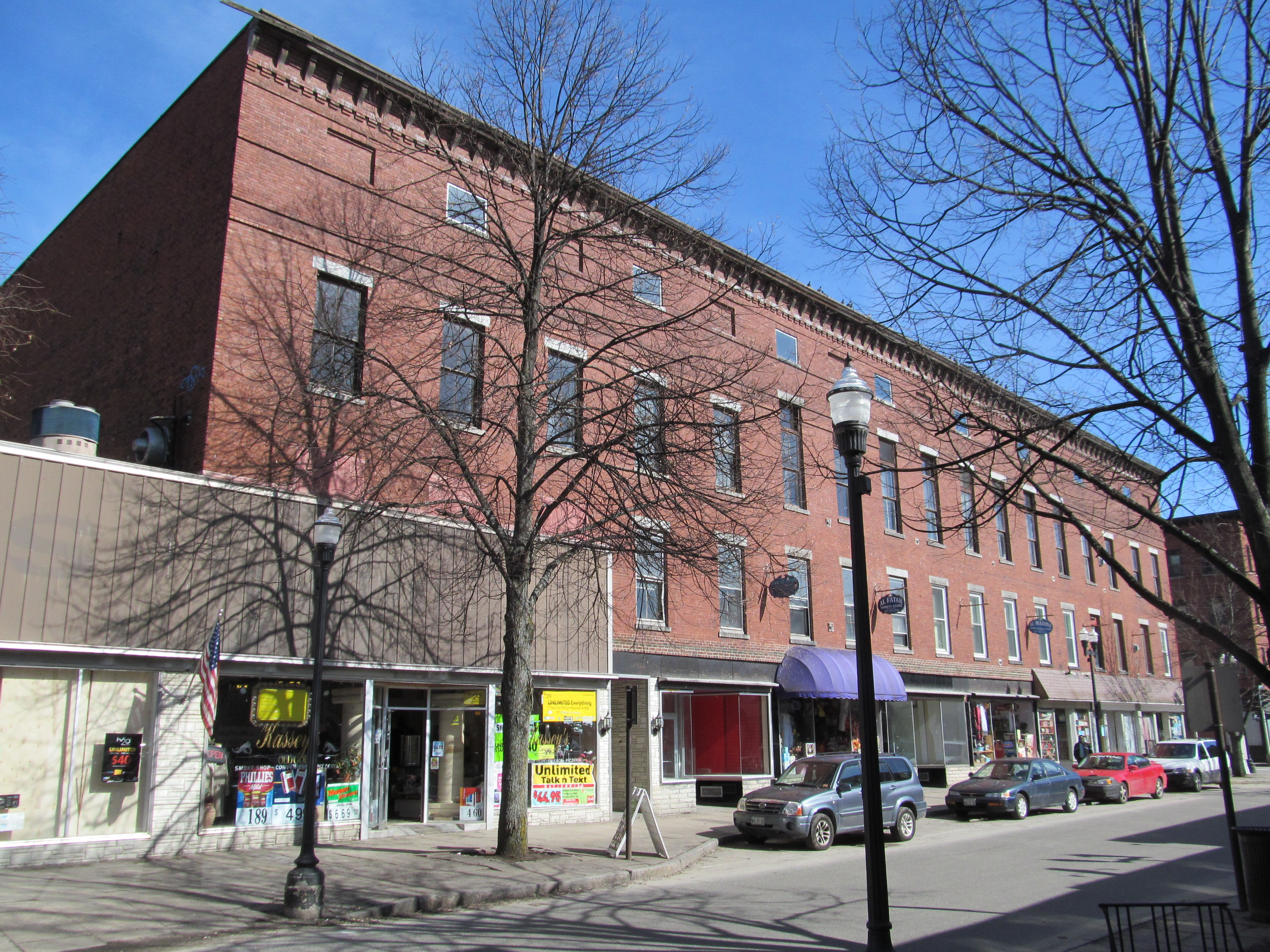
- College Block-Lisbon Block

- Location within Maine Location within the United States
- Location: 248–274 Lisbon St., Lewiston, Maine
- Coordinates: 44°5′39″N 70°12′58″W
- Area: less than one acre
- Built: 1855
- Architectural style: Greek Revival, Italianate
- MPS: Lewiston Commercial District MRA
- NRHP reference No.: 86002279
- Added to NRHP: April 25, 1986

The College Block/Lisbon Block is an historic commercial and civic building in Lewiston, Maine, United States. Built in 1855-56, it is the oldest surviving building in the city of the Franklin Company, the city's major early developer. The building has house many local civic groups, and served as Lewiston's town hall prior to its incorporation as a city in 1863. It was listed on the National Register of Historic Places in 1986.

== Description and history ==
The College Block/Lisbon Block stands on the east side of Lisbon Street, the main street in Lewiston’s commercial downtown, at the northeast corner with Chestnut Street. It is a long four-story brick building, with seventeen bays facing Lisbon Street. It has eight storefronts on the ground floor, each with recessed entries flanked by display windows, and a modest building entrance to the right of the leftmost storefront. The second and third floor windows are rectangular sash, with stone sills and lintels. Eight windows near the center of the second floor are taller, with transom panes above the sashes. The fourth floor bays have a combination of fixed-pane windows and blind brick panels. The building is capped with a flat roof with projecting Italianate cornice.

The block was built in 1855-56 by the Franklin Company, and was one of the first buildings it erected in what is now Lewiston's downtown. The building's upper-level meeting spaces have been used over the decades as the town hall, space for church congregations to worship, and a wide array of fraternal and social civic organizations. The city's first Franco-American society, the Institute Jacques-Cartier, met here from the 1870s until 1939. Originally called the Lisbon Block, it was renamed the College Block c. 1881 after ownership of the building was taken over by Bates College.

== See also ==
- National Register of Historic Places listings in Androscoggin County, Maine
