= George Seaverns House =

Historic house in Maine, United States

- U.S. National Register of Historic Places
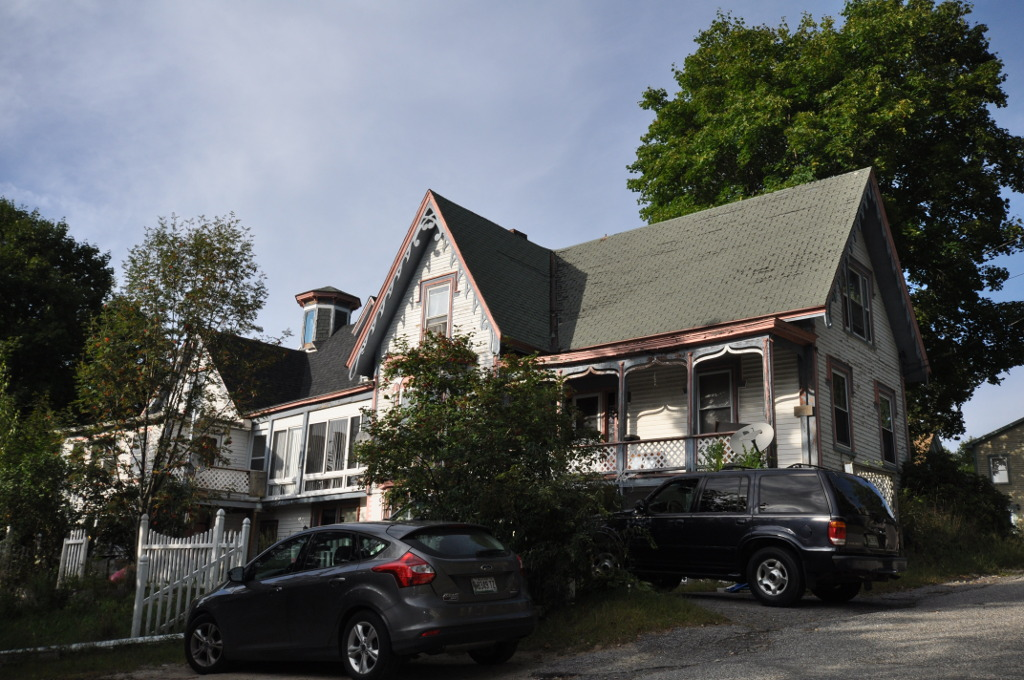

- Location within Maine Location within the United States
- Location: 8 High St., Mechanic Falls, Maine
- Coordinates: 44°6′37″N 70°23′21″W
- Built: 1853
- Architect: Seaverns, George W.
- Architectural style: Gothic Revival
- NRHP reference No.: 85002180
- Added to NRHP: September 12, 1985

The George Seaverns House is a historic house at 8 High Street in Mechanic Falls, Maine. Built in 1853, it is distinctive and prominent local example of Gothic Revival architecture, with association to individuals important in the local paper industry. The house was listed on the National Register of Historic Places in 1985.

== Description and history ==
The George Seaverns House is located in the village of Mechanic Falls, on a rise on the west side of High Street, a residential side street overlooking the village center. It is a 1 1/2-story wood-frame structure, with a gabled roof, clapboard siding, and a brick foundation. The house occupies a sloping site which would have overlooked Elm Street, a major thoroughfare, when it was built. The house is stylistically Gothic Revival in character, with decorative vergeboard, window hoods, and ogee brackets. The house's interior has an unusual asymmetrical plan, diverging from the conventional central hall plans that typified area houses of the period. Its main (western) elevation features a series of porches supported by chamfered posts with decorative brackets.

The house was built in 1853 by George W. Seaverns, whose only known description is as a "paper worker" in the locally prominent paper industry. A second owner, later in the 19th century, was Charles E. Stevens, president of the Mechanic Falls Manufacturing Company.

== See also ==
- National Register of Historic Places listings in Androscoggin County, Maine
