= Clough Meeting House =

Historic church in Maine, United States

- U.S. National Register of Historic Places
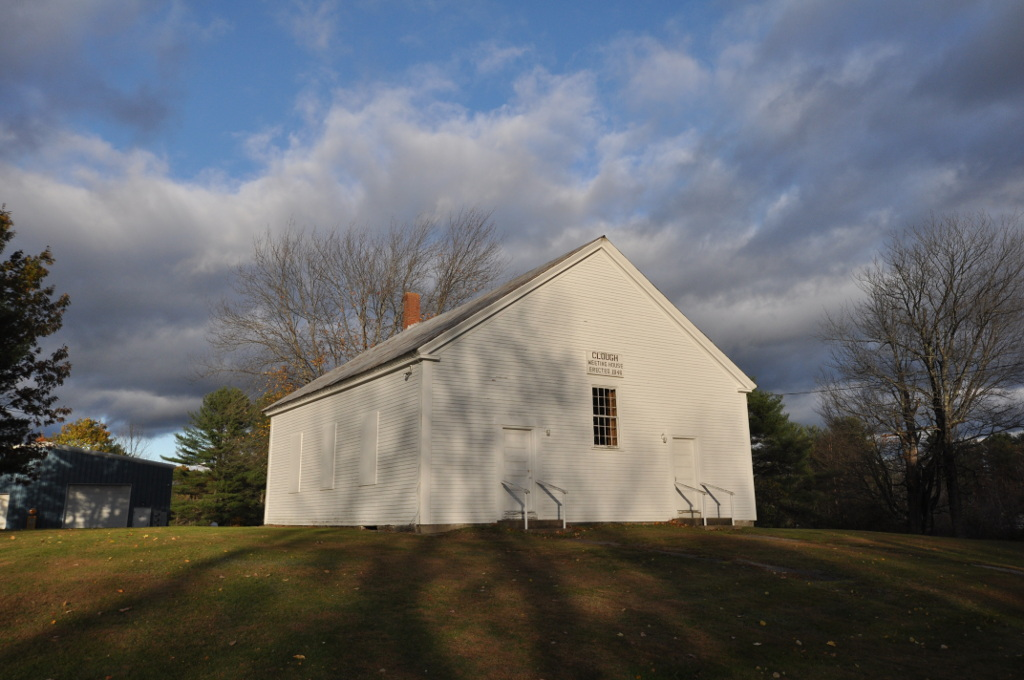

- Location within Maine Location within the United States
- Location: 32 South Lisbon Rd., Lewiston, Maine
- Coordinates: 44°3′49″N 70°8′52″W
- Area: less than one acre
- Built: 1846
- Built by: Garcelon, Henry
- NRHP reference No.: 13000438
- Added to NRHP: June 25, 2013

The Clough Meeting House, also known as the Second Free Will Baptist Church, is a historic church at 32 South Lisbon Road in Lewiston, Maine. Built in 1846 for a Free Will Baptist congregation, it is notable for its "reverse plan" layout (with the pulpit at the rear), and its distinctive grain-painted interior. It was listed on the National Register of Historic Places in 2013.

== Description and history ==
The Clough Meeting House is located in a lightly developed part of southern Lewiston, on the north side of South Lisbon Road, across the street from the Clough Cemetery. It is a modest vernacular single-story wood frame structure, with a gabled roof and clapboard siding. Its main facade has two symmetrically placed entrances, flanking a raised sash window, and the side elevations have three windows each. The entrances lead into separate vestibules, which are separated by the raised area housing the pulpit. From these entrance is gained to the main hall, which occupies the rest of the building. At the rear wall is a "singing stand" (functionally a choir loft), another raised platform framed by wood paneling. Most of the hall is taken up by bench pews, which are arrayed facing the front of the building. The pulpit is set in an alcove between the vestibules, which is finished with a plastered cove ceiling. Some elements of the interior have been painted to resemble finer wood grain finish, while others have been smoke painted, which also gives a grainy appearance.

The meeting house was built in 1846 by Henry Garcelon, a local farmer. It is one of a small number of churches known in the state that was originally designed with the reverse plan layout in mind, a form preferred by the Free Will Baptists at that time. It is equally notable for the well-preserved interior painting; the smoke painting on the stairs leading to the front and rear platforms is unknown elsewhere in the state. The congregation's records, now preserved by the Androscoggin County Historical Society, document the specifications to which the church was built.

Regular services were held at the meeting house until about 1917, after which it was sold to the Clough Cemetery Association, which now maintains the building.

== See also ==
- National Register of Historic Places listings in Androscoggin County, Maine
