= Philip M. and Deborah N. Isaacson House =

Historic house in Maine, United States

- U.S. National Register of Historic Places
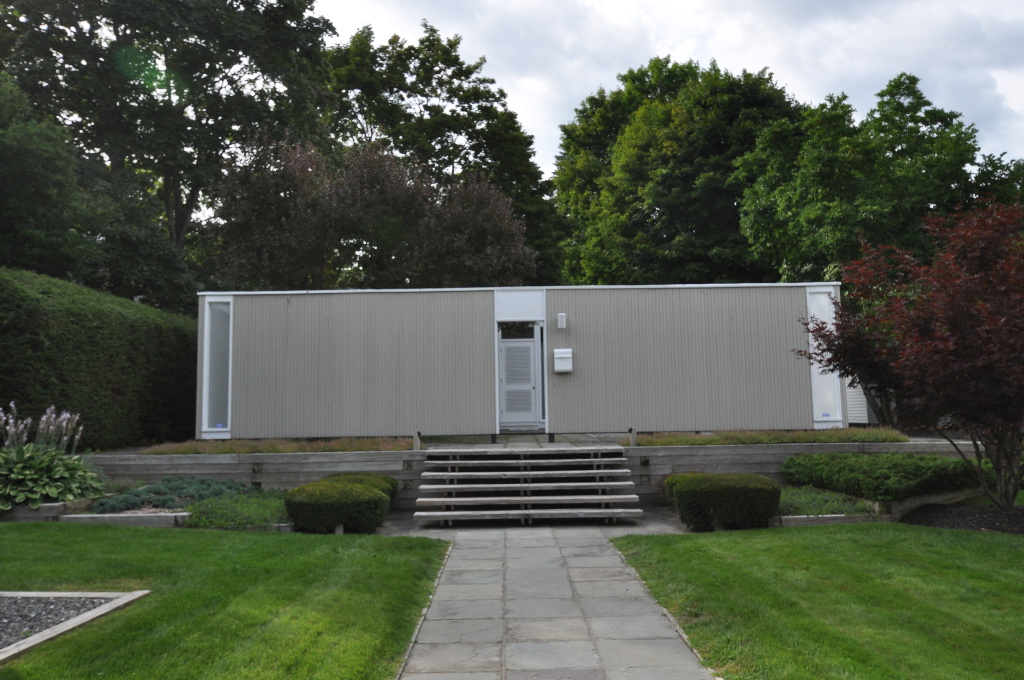

- Location within Maine Location within the United States
- Location: 2 Benson St., Lewiston, Maine
- Coordinates: 44°6′30″N 70°12′25″W
- Built: 1959
- Architect: Bruck, F. Frederick
- Architectural style: Mid-Century Modern
- NRHP reference No.: 11000816
- Added to NRHP: November 18, 2011

The Isaacson House is a historic house at 2 Benson Street in Lewiston, Maine. Built in 1959 for Philip M. Isaacson, a local lawyer, it is a distinctive regional example of modest Mid-Century Modern residential architecture, that drew nationwide notice in architectural circles after its construction. It was listed on the National Register of Historic Places in 2011.

== Description and history ==
The Isaacson House stands in a residential area west of the Bates College campus and north of downtown Lewiston, on the west side of Benson Street. It is a single-story square structure with a flat roof, and is set further back from the street than neighboring houses. A central stone walkway approaches the house, which is set on a terraced rise accessed via floating stone steps. The exterior is finished in vertical siding, and features floor-to-ceiling windows with white trim. At the center of the front facade is a doorway-sized opening leading into a courtyard, which functions as a transitional space between the outside and inside. The main block of the house is divided into rooms three wide and three deep. Interior finish details include custom millwork and hardware.

The house was built in 1959 for Philip M. Isaacson, a young lawyer and Lewiston native. Isaacson had become interested in modern architecture while studying law at Harvard Law School, and initially approached Josep Lluís Sert with a proposition to design a small year-round house that could be built for $25,000. Sert rejected his proposal, and Isaacson eventually commissioned F. Frederick Bruck, a young architect trained at the Bauhaus-influenced Harvard Graduate School of Design, for the job. The house that Bruck designed ended up costing $32,000. Even the smallest details of interior finishes were included in his design. The house was named one of America's outstanding homes by the American Institute of Architects.

== See also ==
- National Register of Historic Places listings in Androscoggin County, Maine
