= Cape Site =

- U.S. National Register of Historic Places
- Nearest city: West Leeds, Maine
- MPS: Androscoggin River Drainage Prehistoric Sites MPS
- NRHP reference No.: 92001511
- Added to NRHP: November 14, 1992

The Cape Site, designated Site 36.27 by the Maine Archaeological Survey, is a prehistoric archaeological site in West Leeds, Maine. Finds at the well-stratified waterfront site include ceramic fragments, stone tools, and remains of habitation dating as far as 6000 BCE. The site was listed on the National Register of Historic Places in 1992.

== Description ==
The Cape Site is located on a waterfront, and was first subjected significant test excavations in 1987. It is characterized by sandy soils and is generally forested. Test excavations yielded fifteen distinct strata to a depth of 140 centimetres (4.6 ft), the top six of which apparently post-date colonial agricultural use of the land.

The oldest feature at the site, found at a depth of about 110 centimetres (3.6 ft), was a cluster of bone fragments, along with burned seeds and some charcoal, which was radiocarbon dated to about 6000 BCE. The bone fragments unable to be identified in detail due to the high water table during the excavation. Ceramic fragments were found at a higher layer, which, while not dated, are stylistically consistent with finds from other sites that were dated to the Early and Middle Woodland Period (c. 600–100 BCE). One stone tool, a biface made of rhyolite, was also found.

The site's importance lies in its well stratified nature, as well as its clear evidence of multiple habitation periods. The site is threatened by fluctuating water levels in the area.

== See also ==
- National Register of Historic Places listings in Androscoggin County, Maine
