= Lewiston Mills and Water Power System Historic District =

Historic district in Maine, United States

- U.S. National Register of Historic Places
- U.S. Historic district
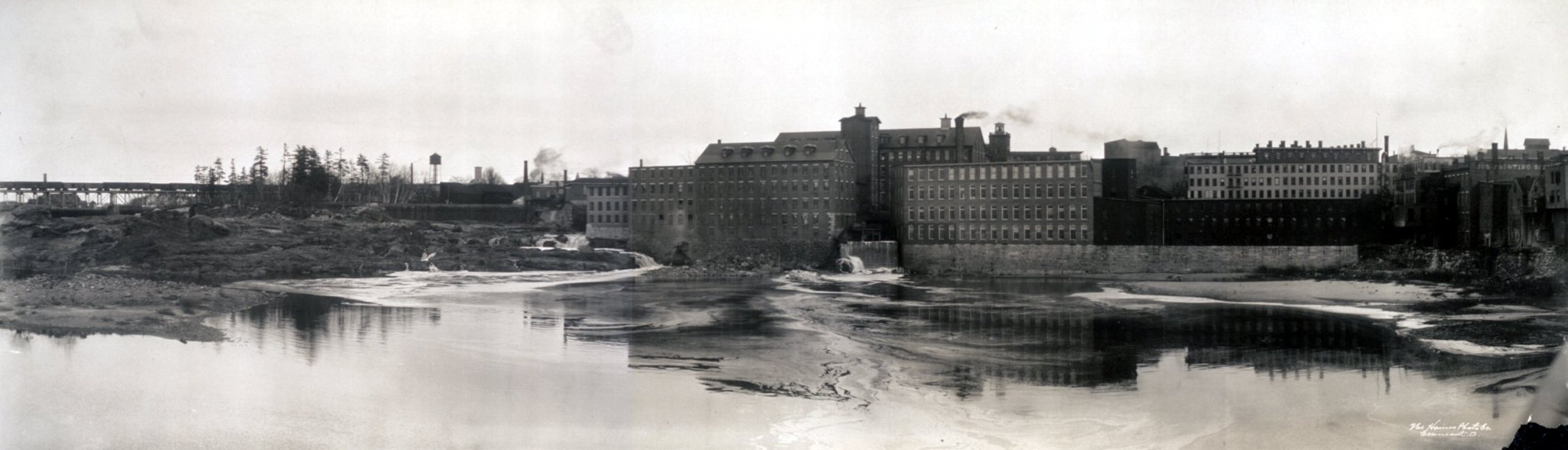
- c. 1910 view of the Lewiston mills

- Location within Maine Location within the United States
- Location: Bounded by Androscoggin R., Lisbon, Locust & Bates Sts., Lewiston, Maine
- Coordinates: 44°5′38″N 70°13′2″W
- Area: 1 acre (0.40 ha)
- Built: 1850
- NRHP reference No.: 15000415
- Added to NRHP: July 14, 2015

The Lewiston Mills and Water Power System Historic District encompasses the major 19th-century mill complexes and associated water power systems in Lewiston, Maine. Developed beginning in 1850, Lewiston's canals and mills were the largest textile mill complex in the state, and one of the best-preserved mature large-scale expressions of the Lowell system of cotton textile manufacturing, perfected at Waltham and Lowell, Massachusetts earlier in the 19th century. The district includes a series power canals and mill complexes developed over a 100-year period, along with mill worker housing and transportation infrastructure. It was listed on the National Register of Historic Places in 2015.

== Description and history ==
The Lewiston Water Power Company was founded about 1850 by a group of investors from Boston, Massachusetts, seeking to capitalize on the water power of the falls on the Androscoggin River between Lewiston and Auburn. The company built a series of power canals, and built cotton spinning and weaving mills along their banks. To facilitate the work of multiple mill complexes, they also constructed one of the world's largest bleacheries, and an industrial machine shop for producing parts and service for the mill equipment. The mills were successful and grew despite the start of the American Civil War in 1861, which greatly reduced cotton supplies, by stockpiling large amounts of raw cotton. The mills were able to bring supplies in and ship products out by rail, which had been brought to Lewiston in 1849. The Grand Trunk Station, located on the island formed by the canals, also brought in many French Canadian workers, who were employed by the mills, and came to be known as a local Ellis Island. The mill owners also built worker housing and community halls in proximity to the mills.

The historic district is organized with the main, or upper, power canal as its spine. It extends from above the great falls on the river, south to Gully Brook, where it empties back into the river. Parallel and west of this canal lies the lower canal, with three cross canals joining them. At the northern end of the upper canal is one large complex of buildings, where the bleachery and machine shop were located. Mill complexes flanking these canals include the Bates Mill, the Lewiston Mill, the Continental Mill, and the Androscoggin Mill. The district also includes the dam spanning the river at great falls, and the bridge of the Maine Central Railroad.

== See also ==
- National Register of Historic Places listings in Androscoggin County, Maine
