= Samuel Penney House =

Historic house in Maine, United States

- U.S. National Register of Historic Places
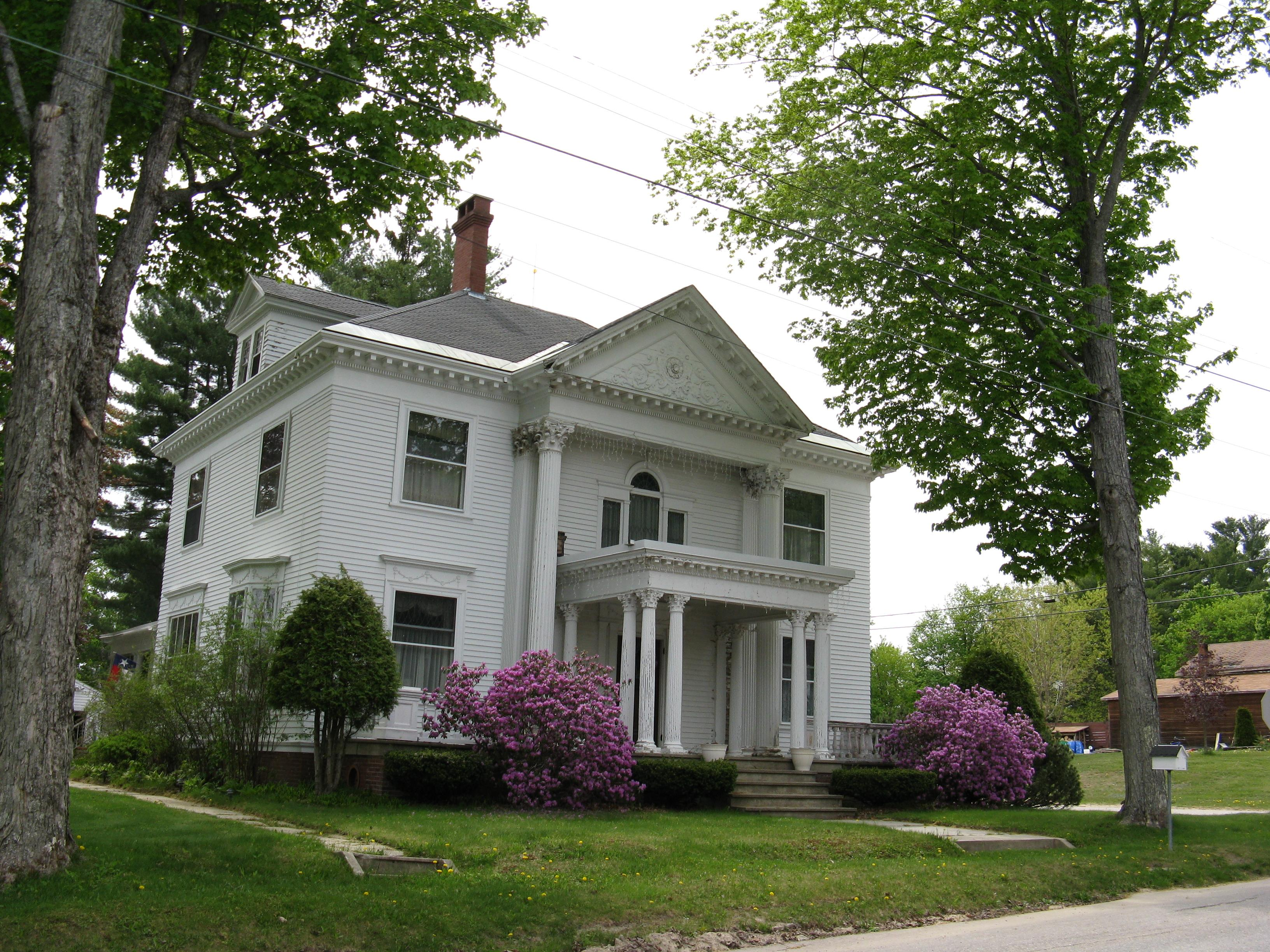
- Samuel Penney House circa 1902

- Location within Maine Location within the United States
- Location: Mechanic Falls, Maine
- Coordinates: 44°6′40″N 70°23′45″W
- Built: 1902
- Architect: Miller, William R.
- Architectural style: Colonial Revival, Victorian, Greek Revival
- NRHP reference No.: 02000346
- Added to NRHP: April 11, 2002

The Samuel Penney House is a historic house at 78 Maple Street in Mechanic Falls, Maine. The house was completed in 1902 to design by William R. Miller and is considered the finest example of his residential work. It was originally one of three identical houses that stood side by side until the early 1920s. It was added to the National Register of Historic Places in 2002.

== Description and history ==
The Penney House is located on the west side of the Mechanic Falls village, at the southern corner of Maple and Summer Streets. It is a high-style 2 1/2-story Georgian Revival structure, with a dormered hip roof, clapboard siding, and a foundation of brick and granite. Its principal feature is a full-height elaborate portico projecting from the front, with two-story Corinthian columns and pilasters supporting a fully pedimented and modillioned gable with a floral design at its center. This portico shelters a Palladian window at the second level, and partially covers a single-story porch that extends over the main entrance, with clustered Corinthian columns for support. Ground floor windows are topped by entablatures decorated with swags, and topped by projecting cornices. The interior continues the high quality workmanship, with decorative plasterwork and woodwork, and a stained glass window at the landing of the main staircase.

The house was designed by Lewiston architect William R. Miller, and was his first residential commission. It is an extraordinarily rich Colonial Revival building for a relatively modest formerly industrial village setting in the state, but also typical of Miller's flamboyant style. It is one of three nearly identical houses designed by Miller for the Penney brothers, owners of a local factory that built steam engines and boilers. The house of Almont Penney was destroyed by fire, and that of Charles Penney was moved and partly dismembered in the 1940s. The present house, when it was listed on the National Register of Historic Places in 2002, still used original knob-and-tube wiring installed when the house was built, and portions of its original steam heating plant (presumably manufactured by the Penney's plant) were also still in use.

== See also ==
- National Register of Historic Places listings in Androscoggin County, Maine
