= Androscoggin Mill Block =

Historic house in Maine, United States

- U.S. National Register of Historic Places
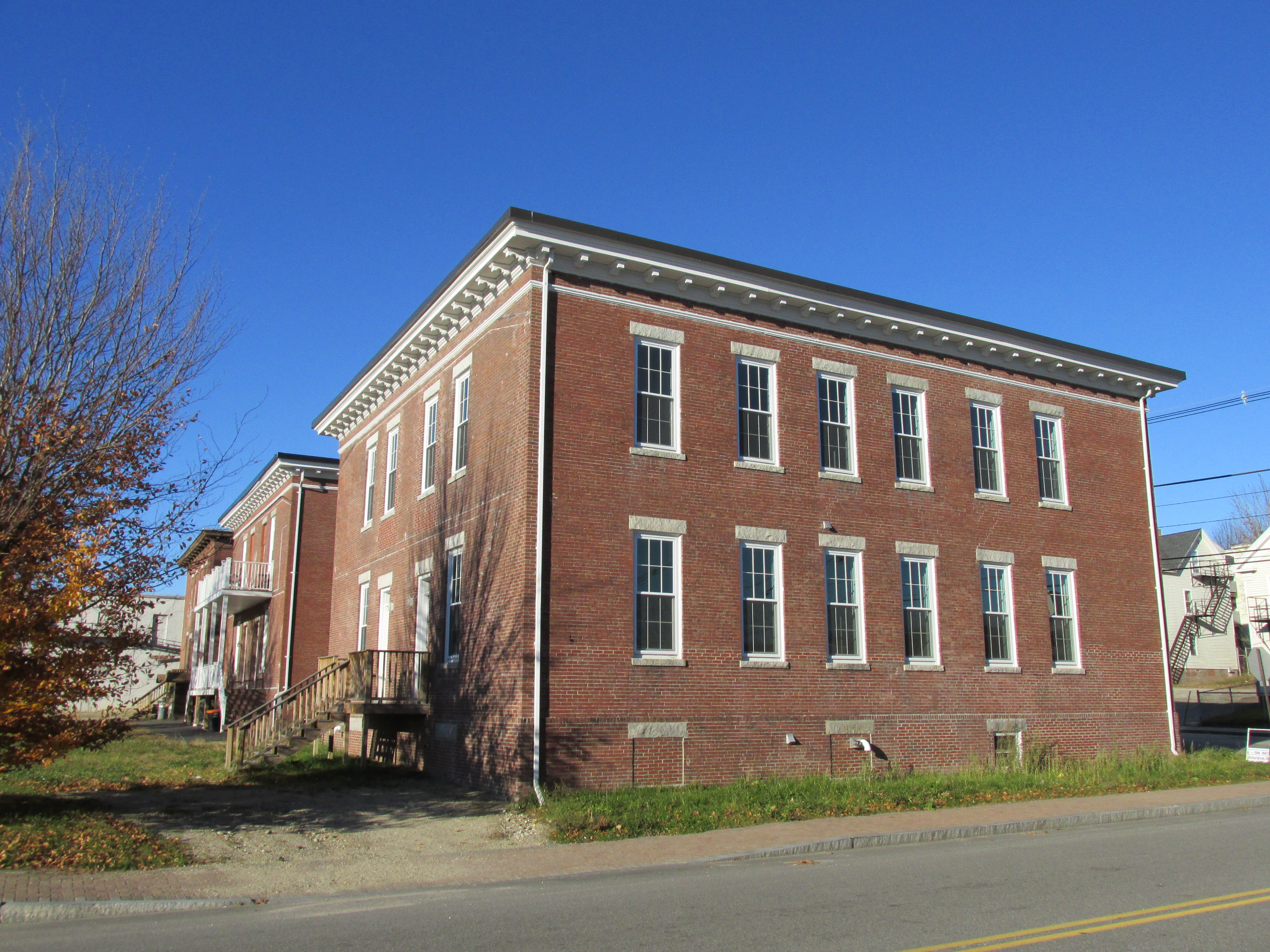
- Androscoggin Mill Block

- Location within Maine Location within the United States
- Location: Lewiston, Maine
- Coordinates: 44°5′27″N 70°12′49″W
- Area: less than one acre
- Built: 1866
- Architect: Thorne, Thomas Dresser
- Architectural style: Greek Revival, Italianate
- NRHP reference No.: 01000367
- Added to NRHP: April 12, 2001

The Androscoggin Mill Block is an historic tenement house at 269-271 Park Street in Lewiston, Maine, United States. The two-story brick building was one of several built in 1866 by the Androscoggin Mill Company to provide housing for workers with families, and is one of only three such 19th-century buildings to survive in the city. The building was listed on the National Register of Historic Places in 2001.

== Description and history ==
The Androscoggin Mill Block is set at the southern edge of Lewiston's downtown area, and about two blocks east of the canal from which the city's 19th-century mills drew their power. It is one of three nearly-identical buildings on the west side of Park Street, north of its junction with Maple Street. It is a two-story brick building, with a low hip roof and a granite foundation. Its main facade is four bays wide, and is symmetrically arranged, with two doorways in the center bays on the first floor, and sash windows in the other bays. The windows have granite lintels and sills, and the cornice is studded with Italianate brackets. The sides of the building have six bays of windows on each level. The interior of the building as built housed four units, two on each floor. Much of the original woodwork from the building's construction has been preserved, despite a variety of uses and the addition of indoor plumbing to the building.

Due to rapid growth beginning in the 1850s, all of the major operators of mills in Lewiston began to build housing for their workers. Most of these facilities were little more than boarding houses, with single rooms and communal dining rooms. Of 44 known to have been built between 1852 and 1866, only five were found to be still standing by a c. 2000 survey. Two of those, built by the Continental Mill Company, were boarding houses that have since been converted to more conventional residential use. This building is one of the three surviving buildings built specifically to house worker families. They were built for the Androscoggin Mill Company by a prolific local master builder, Thomas Dresser Thorne. This building was sold by the company into private hands, and was owned by the city at the time of its listing on the National Register of Historic Places in 2001.

== See also ==
- National Register of Historic Places listings in Androscoggin County, Maine
