= Free Baptist Church (Auburn, Maine) =

Historic church in Maine, United States

- U.S. National Register of Historic Places
- U.S. Historic district
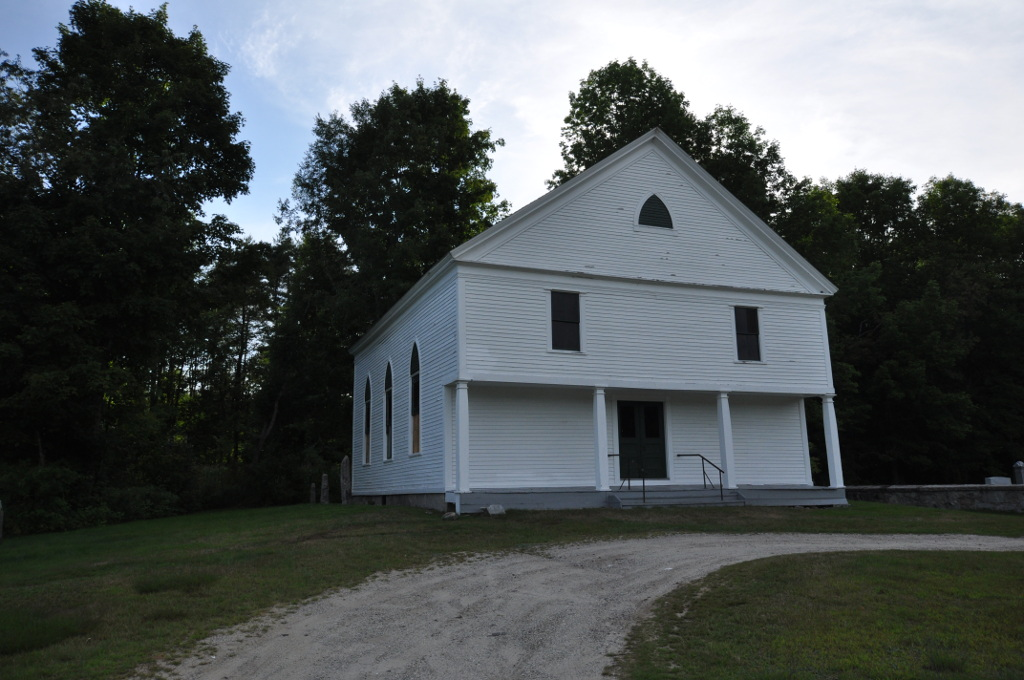

- Location within Maine Location within the United States
- Location: Auburn, Maine
- Coordinates: 44°3′11″N 70°12′11″W
- Area: less than one acre
- Architectural style: Greek Revival, Gothic Revival
- NRHP reference No.: 89000843
- Added to NRHP: July 13, 1989

The Free Baptist Church, also known as the Penley Corner Church, is a historic church on Riverside Drive in Auburn, Maine. Built in 1833, the building's interior was extensively redecorated in the late 19th century with Queen Anne stained glass, stencilwork, and multicolored painting. Its primarily for the well-preserved interior artwork that this building was listed on the National Register of Historic Places in 1989.

== Description and history ==
The Penley Corner Church is located on the west side of Riverside Drive in rural southern Auburn, a short way north of Penley Corner Road. It stands on a property that also includes a small cemetery historically associated with the church. The building is a single-story wood frame structure, with a gable roof, clapboard siding, and granite foundation. There is no tower. The main facade faces east, and is symmetrically arranged, with an engaged porch extending the width, supported by square posts. A single door provides access to the building at the center of the porch, and there are two windows on the gallery level. A small lancet-shaped louver occupies the center of the gable. The windows on the sides are all lancet-arched in the Gothic Revival style.

The plainness of the building's exterior is in marked contrast to a vividly decorated interior. From the entrance one passes into a vestibule area under the gallery, which is accessed by stairs to one side. Pews are arranged in three groups, up to a raised platform that spans 2/3 of the building width at the far end, with additional small groups of pews at its sides. A low balustrade demarcates the pulpit, which has a stenciled backdrop. The walls are wainscoted, and the ceiling is made of boxed beams and wood sheathing. Foliated stencilwork lines the sheathing, while the beams have a multicolored stencilwork pattern on their bottoms. The angled portions of the ceiling are also decorated with foliate stencils. Windows on the building sides have colored sections, and the buildings sole interior light source is a kerosene chandelier.

The Free Will Baptist congregation in Auburn dates to 1808, and had grown by the late 1820s to a size sufficient to warrant construction of a church. This building was erected in 1833, although its initial interior features are not known, many records having been destroyed by a fire. As a result, it is also not known exactly when the interior decorations were made, which are stylistically from the Queen Anne period. The church's congregation had declined in the 1880s to the point where services were held only sporadically, and came to an end around the turn of the 20th century. The building was briefly used by another congregation in the 1950s, and was rescued from demolition by local citizens who formed a non-profit to oversee its preservation. Services are now held annually, and the building is well maintained.

== See also ==
- National Register of Historic Places listings in Androscoggin County, Maine
