= Poland station =

Historic house in Maine, United States

- Poland Railroad Station
- U.S. National Register of Historic Places
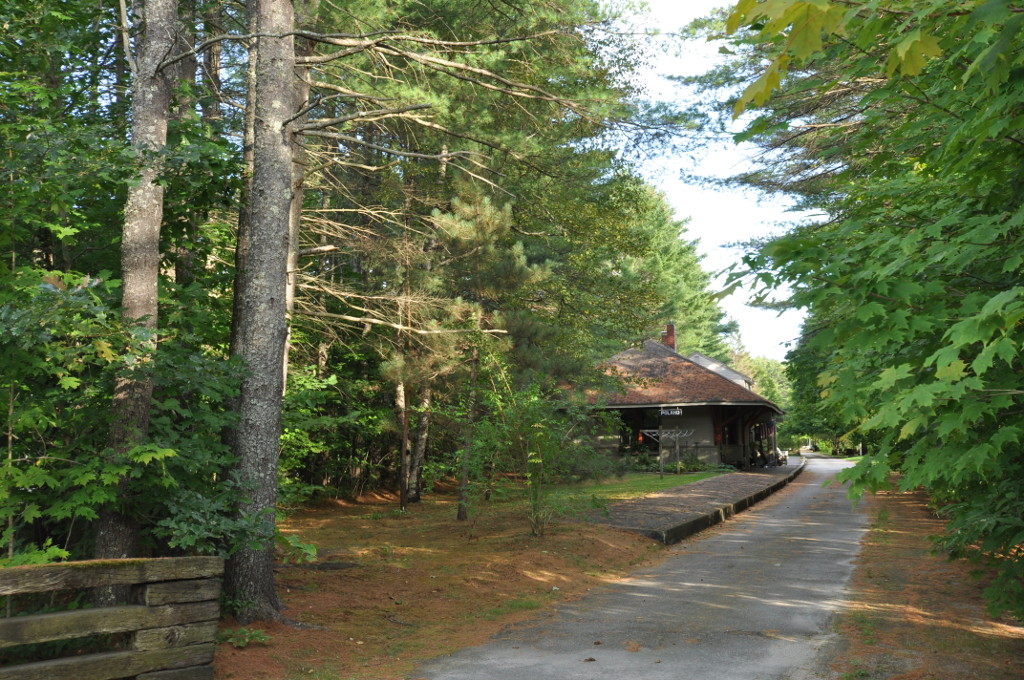

- Location within Maine Location within the United States
- Location: Poland Corner Rd. and Plains Rd. Poland, Maine
- Coordinates: 44°3′42″N 70°23′18″W
- Area: less than one acre
- Built: 1901
- Architect: Maine Central Railroad
- NRHP reference No.: 80004600
- Added to NRHP: July 4, 1980

The Poland Railroad Station is an historic former train station at the corner of Poland Corner and Plains Roads in Poland, Maine. Built in 1901 by the Maine Central Railroad, it is one of the state's best-preserved turn-of-the-century small railroad stations. Now converted to private residential use in a historically sensitive manner, it was listed on the National Register of Historic Places in 1980.

== Description and history ==
The former Poland Railroad Station is located along a former railroad right-of-way northeast of the village center of Poland, at the southern corner of Poland Corner and Plains Roads. It is a single story wood-frame structure, with broad overhanging hip roof and two interior chimneys. It is clad primarily in horizontal clapboards, with a band of vertical boards. The roof eaves are supported by relatively simple large knee brackets. The interior of the building has retained its original partitions, and the ticket office with window grill is still in place, despite the building's conversion to residential use.

The station was built in 1901, on a side line built from the Grand Trunk Railway by the Maine Central Railroad to provide service to Poland village and the Poland Spring Resort a bit further to the south. The rail line formerly ran along what is now the driveway for the residence, and extended from Lewiston to Mechanic Falls. This station is both a well-kept example of Maine's railroad stations of the period, and is one of the best examples of their residential conversion.

== See also ==
- National Register of Historic Places listings in Androscoggin County, Maine

Preceding station	Maine Central Railroad	Following station
Mechanic Falls toward Oquossoc	Rangeley Division	Poland Springs toward Lewiston
