= Lamb Block =

- U.S. National Register of Historic Places
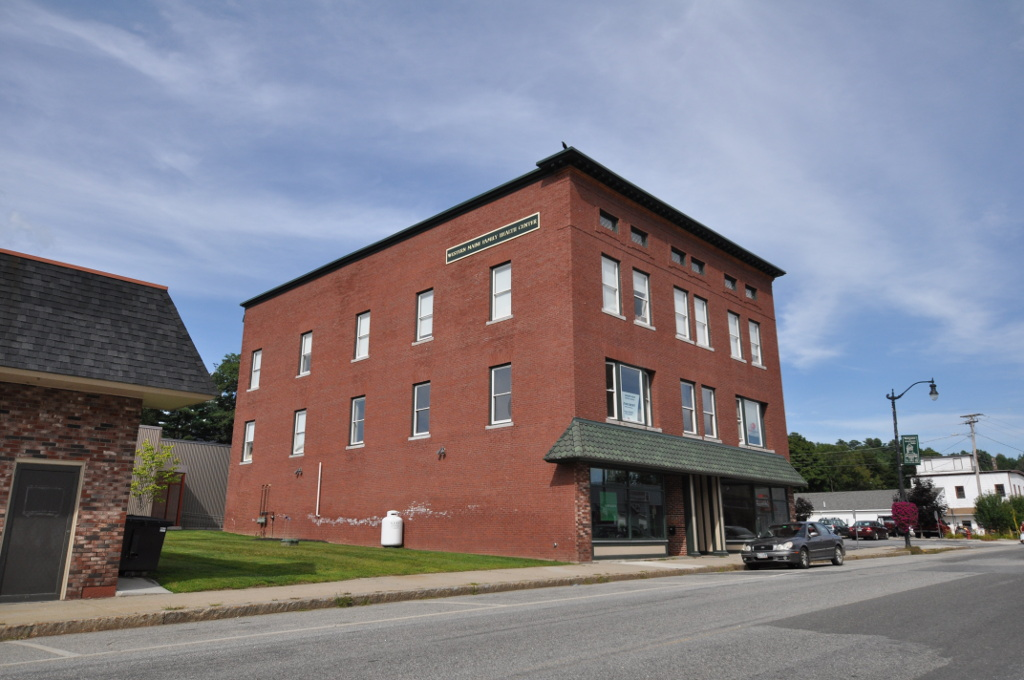

- Location within Maine Location within the United States
- Location: 10 Depot St., Livermore Falls, Maine
- Coordinates: 44°28′21″N 70°11′19″W
- Built: 1895
- Architect: George M. Coombs
- NRHP reference No.: 12000891
- Added to NRHP: October 31, 2012

The Lamb Block is a historic commercial building at 10 Depot Street in Livermore Falls, Maine. Built in 1895 to a design by George M. Coombs, it was the town's first masonry commercial block, and acted as a prototype for later commercial buildings in the town center. The block was added to the National Register of Historic Places in 2012.

== Description and history ==
The Lamb Block stands just off Livermore Falls' Main Street row of commercial buildings, on the north side of Depot Street. It is a three-story masonry building, built out of red brick and set on a rubblestone foundation. The ground floor has two storefronts flanking a central building entrance. The storefronts are arranged with glass display windows on the outside, and recessed entrances toward the center, next to the center entrance, which is also recessed. There is a modern shingled canopy extending across, between the first and second floors. The second and third floors are three bays wide. The second floor outer bays are filled with polygonal windows that are recessed so that the center window is flush. Other bays are filled with pairs of sash windows. The building is capped by a flat roof with an extended modillioned cornice above a line of decorative brickwork.

The block was built in 1895 for John F. Lamb, owned of a local hardware store. It was designed to house retail stores on the ground floor, professional offices on the second, and a meeting hall on the third, a layout that was fairly common in late 19th-century commercial buildings. It was the first substantial brick building to be built Livermore Falls' downtown area, and notably survived an 1898 fire that destroyed much of its downtown. Some of the buildings put up after the fire are similar to this one in style.

== See also ==
- National Register of Historic Places listings in Androscoggin County, Maine
