= Nathaniel Osgood House =

Historic house in Maine, United States

- U.S. National Register of Historic Places
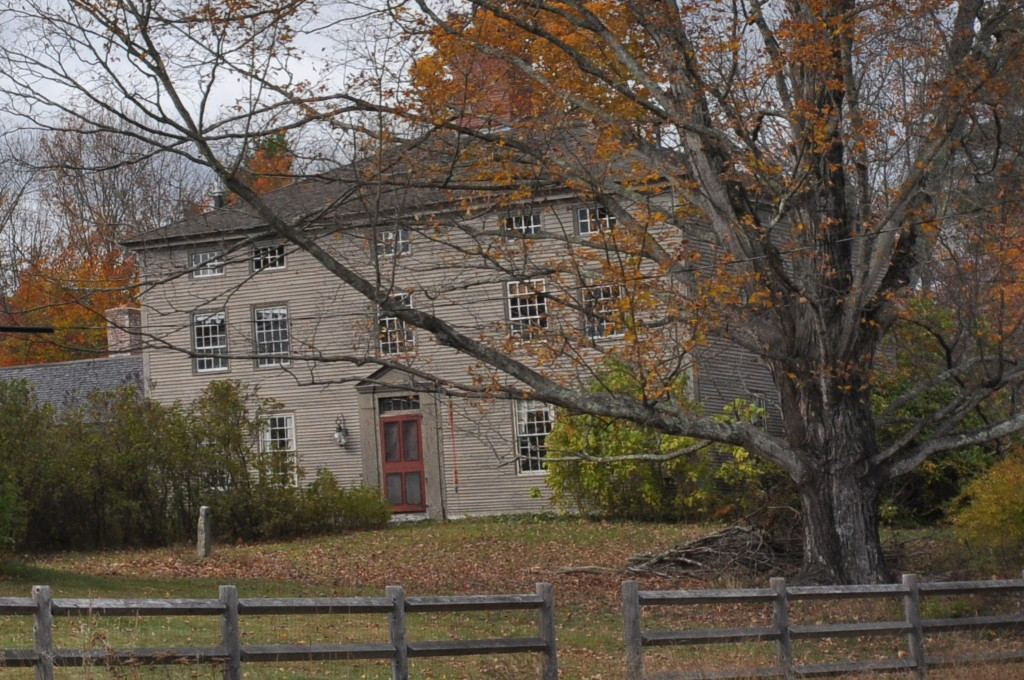

- Location within Maine Location within the United States
- Location: ME 136, Durham, Maine
- Coordinates: 43°55′9″N 70°7′6″W
- Area: less than one acre
- Built: 1785
- Architect: Nathaniel Osgood
- Architectural style: Federal
- NRHP reference No.: 85000608
- Added to NRHP: March 21, 1985

The Nathaniel Osgood House is a historic house on Maine State Route 136 in Durham, Maine, United States. Built in 1785, early in the town's settlement history, it is a well-preserved example of Federal period architecture. It was listed on the National Register of Historic Places in 1985.

== Description and history ==
The Nathaniel Osgood House is located in southern Durham, on the west side of Royalsborough Road (Maine State Route 136). It is a large, three story wood-frame structure, with a hip roof, central chimney, clapboard siding, and granite foundation. It is oriented facing roughly south. Its main facade is five bays wide, with a central entrance flanked by pilasters and topped by a transom and gabled pediment. Windows on the first two floors are 12-over-12 sash, while the third-floor windows are eight-pane fixed sash. On the east (street-facing) side, there is a secondary entrance near the northern corner; that elevation is otherwise two bays wide. A single-story ell extends to the rear (north) of the main block. The interior retains high quality Federal period workmanship.

The area that became Durham was owned in the 1760s by the Pejepscot Proprietors, among them Jonathan Bagley, who served in the American Revolutionary War. Nathaniel Osgood, who served in Bagley's regiment, is believed to have purchased the land where this house stands in 1779. Osgood built this house in 1785; it is one of Maine's best examples of the Federal period four-square hip-roofed central chimney plan.

== See also ==
- National Register of Historic Places listings in Androscoggin County, Maine
