= Union Block (Lewiston, Maine) =

- U.S. National Register of Historic Places
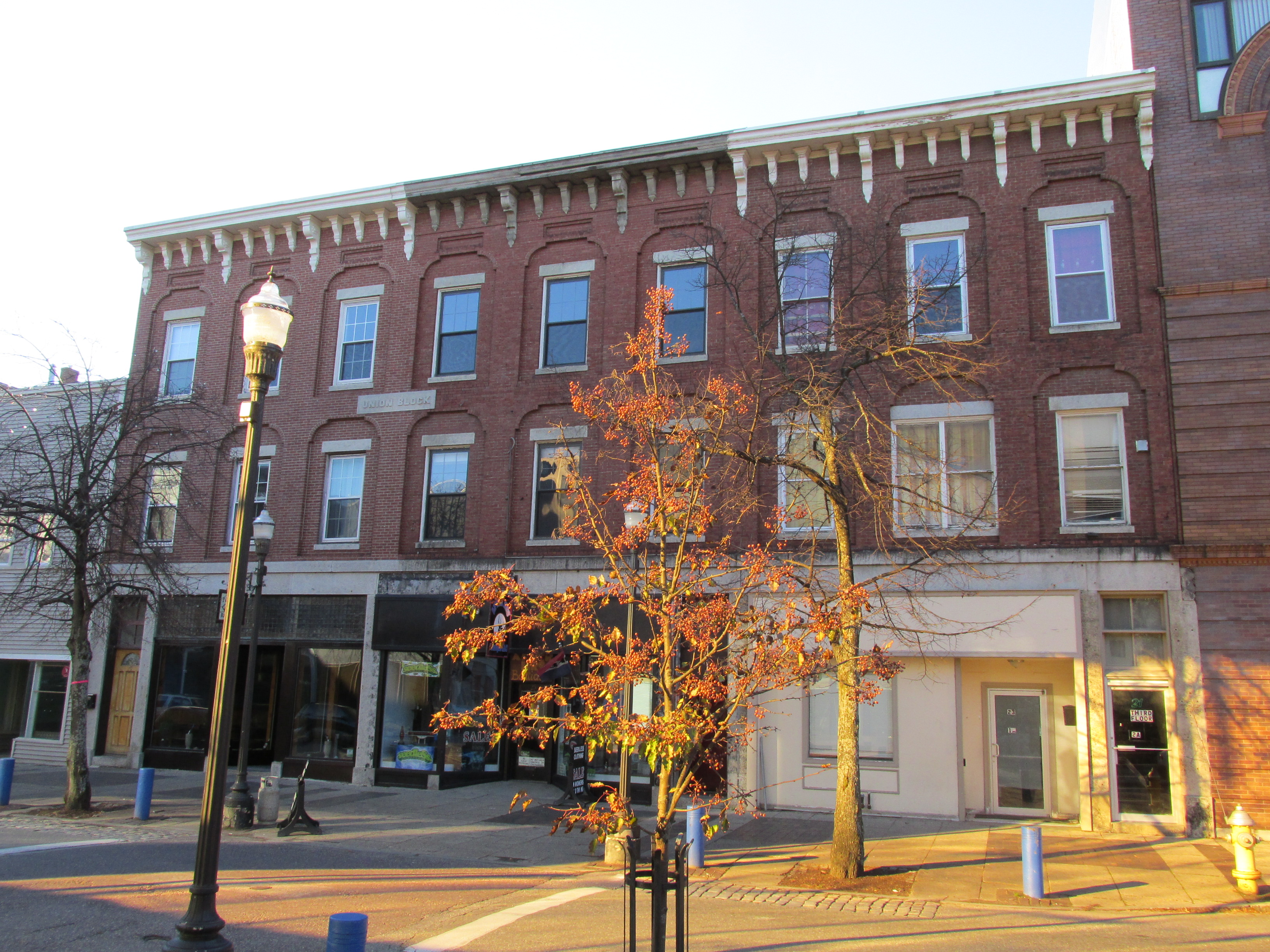
- Union Block

- Location within Maine Location within the United States
- Location: 21-29 Lisbon St., Lewiston, Maine
- Coordinates: 44°5′53″N 70°13′7″W
- Built: 1870
- Architectural style: Italianate
- MPS: Lewiston Commercial District MRA
- NRHP reference No.: 86002291
- Added to NRHP: April 25, 1986

The Union Block is a historic commercial building at 21-29 Lisbon Street in downtown Lewiston, Maine. Built in 1870, it is a good local example of commercial Italianate architecture, built during a significant period of the city's growth. It was listed on the National Register of Historic Places in 1986.

== Description and history ==
The Union Block is set on the west side of Lisbon Street, Lewiston's primary commercial street, just south of its junction with Main Street. It is a three-story brick building, nine bays wide, with three storefronts on the ground floor. The two left storefronts have central recessed entries flanked by glass display windows, while the right one only has a single display window on the left. The storefronts are modern, but are separated by original granite piers. Building entrances are located at the outer ends of the facade. The upper floor windows are set in panels with rounded upper corners, and have granite lintels and sills. The building has a deep cornice with decorative brackets and modillions.

The block was built in 1870 by John Y. Scranton (alternatively "Scruton"), a prominent local clothing retailer who had been in business in Lewiston since 1857. The upper floor house a meeting space that was variously rented to the Knights of Pythias, the International Order of Odd Fellows, and the Kora Temple (a local Shriners organization).

== See also ==
- National Register of Historic Places listings in Androscoggin County, Maine
