= Wilson I Site =

- U.S. National Register of Historic Places
- Nearest city: East Auburn, Maine
- MPS: Androscoggin River Drainage Prehistoric Sites MPS
- NRHP reference No.: 92001512
- Added to NRHP: November 14, 1992

Wilson I Site is a historic site in East Auburn, Maine.

It is also known as "Site #24.33, Maine Archeological Survey." The site was added to the National Historic Register in 1992.
