= Moyer Site =

- U.S. National Register of Historic Places
- Nearest city: Keens Mills, Maine
- MPS: Androscoggin River Drainage Prehistoric Sites MPS
- NRHP reference No.: 92001518
- Added to NRHP: November 14, 1992

Moyer Site is an historic site in Keens Mills, Maine.

The site was added to the National Historic Register on November 14, 1992, and is also known as "Site #36.28, Maine Archeological Survey."
