= Irish Site =

- U.S. National Register of Historic Places
- Nearest city: East Auburn, Maine
- MPS: Androscoggin River Drainage Prehistoric Sites MPS
- NRHP reference No.: 92001517
- Added to NRHP: November 14, 1992

Irish Site is a historic site in East Auburn, Maine.

The site is also known as "Site #24.32, Maine Archeological Survey." It was added to the National Historic Register in 1992.
