= George M. Coombs =

American architect

- Born: November 27, 1851; Brunswick, Maine
- Died: March 26, 1909 (aged 57); Lewiston, Maine
- Occupation: Architect

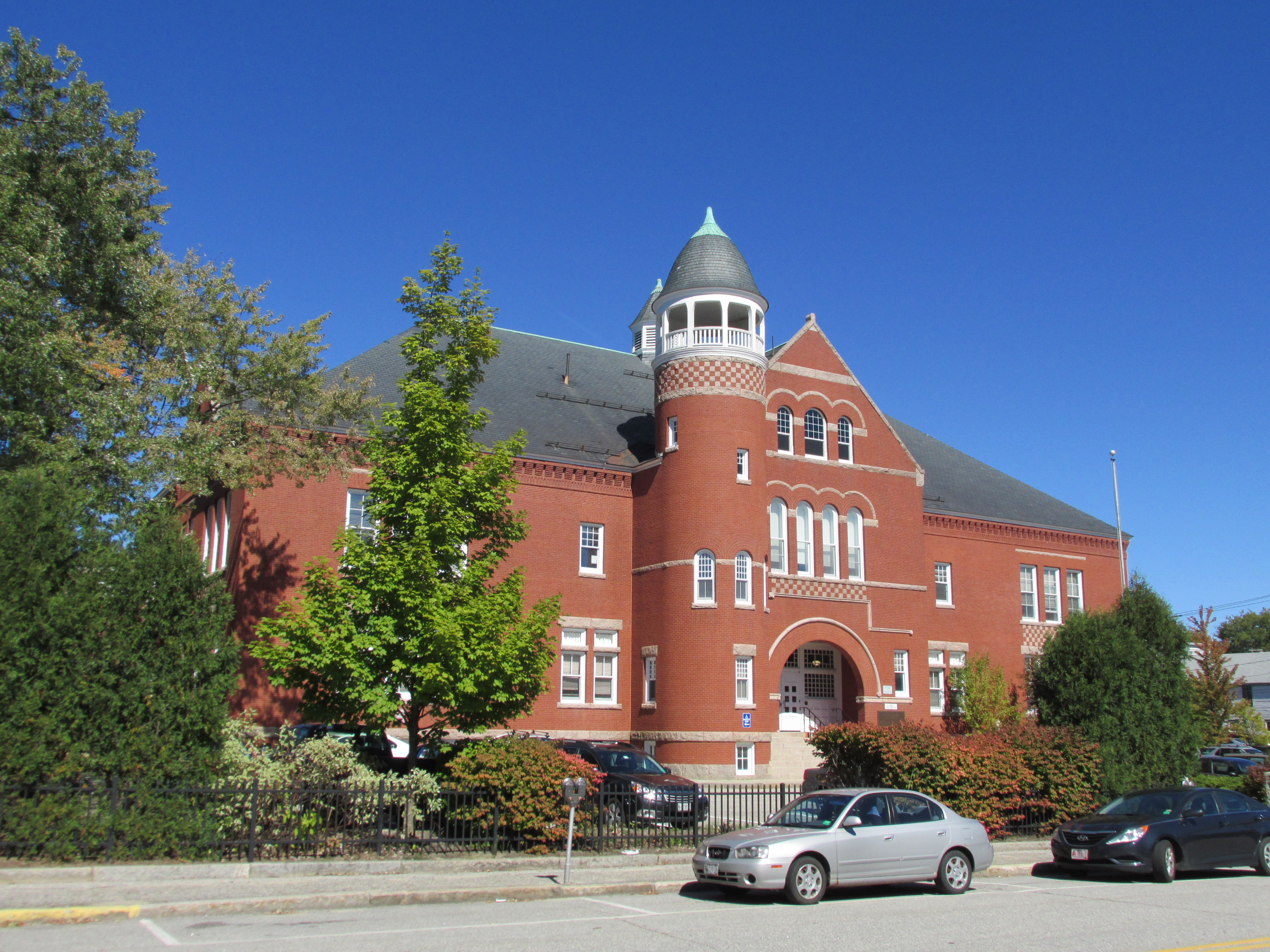
Oak Street School, Lewiston, 1890.

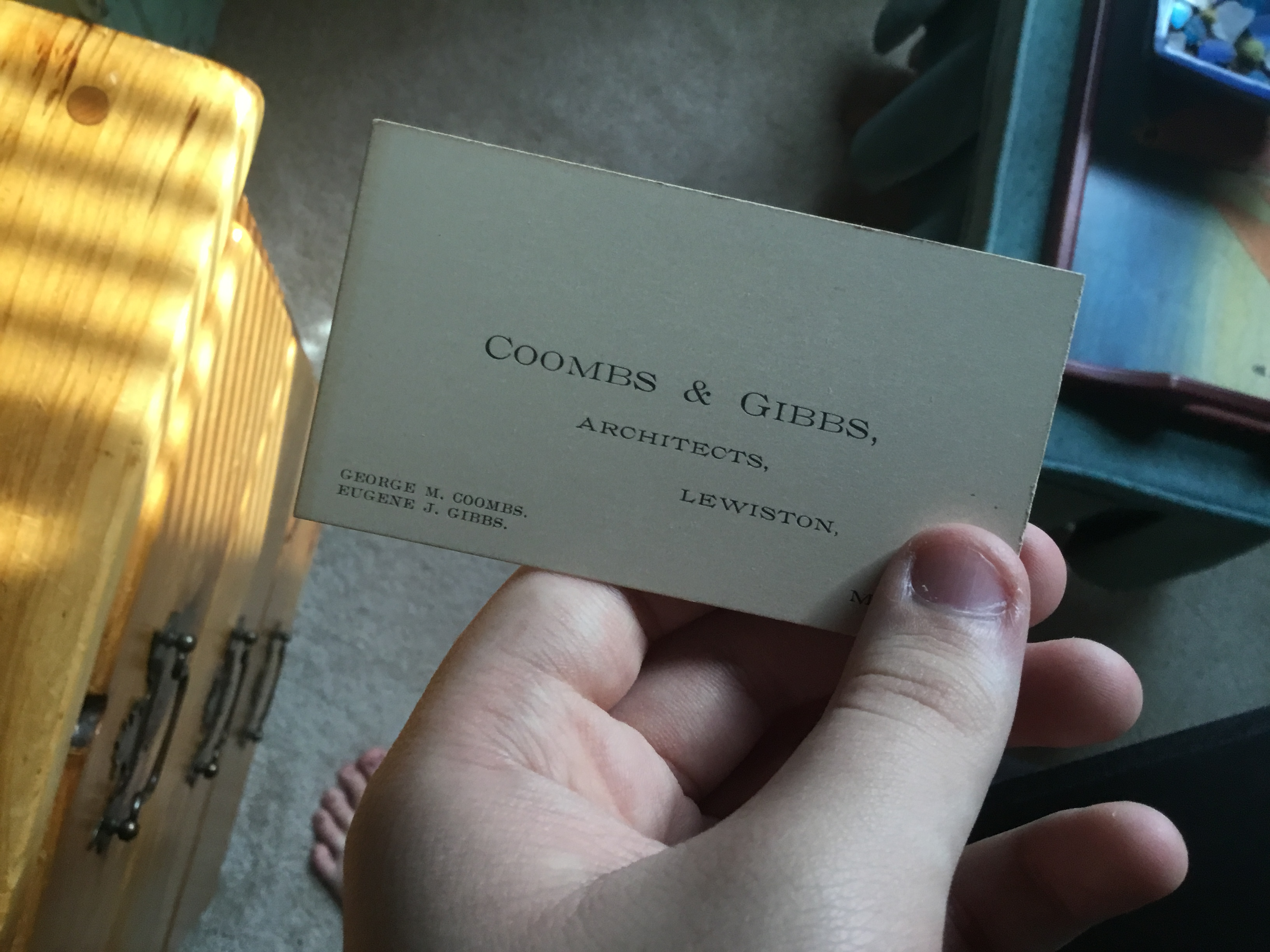
Undated business card for the firm of Coombs & Gibbs.

George M. Coombs (November 27, 1851 – March 27, 1909) was an American architect in practice in Lewiston, Maine from 1874 to 1909.

== Life and career ==
George Millard Coombs was born November 27, 1851, in Brunswick, Maine to John Matthews Coombs, a shipbuilder, and Hannah Williams (Morse) Coombs. Circa 1869, at the age of 17, Coombs moved up the Androscoggin River to Lewiston, then a booming mill town, and worked as a carpenter until 1872. That year, Coombs began working for local architect Charles F. Douglas. He worked for Douglas until 1874, when Douglas left for Philadelphia amidst a period of economic instability. Coombs then formed a partnership, Kimball & Coombs, with Charles H. Kimball, a young architect from Portland. Kimball returned to Portland to open his own office in 1875, and Coombs formed a new partnership, Stevens & Coombs, with Lewiston architect William H. Stevens. This lasted until the death of Stevens in 1880.

During the next decade Coombs became the region's leading architect, and trained many young architects in his office, including his son, Harry S. Coombs, Eugene J. Gibbs, William R. Miller, Addison G. Pulsifer, Elmer I. Thomas and Harry C. Wilkinson. In 1896 he formed a partnership with Gibbs and Wilkinson, known as Coombs, Gibbs & Wilkinson. In 1900 Wilkinson left for Washington, D.C., and the firm continued as Coombs & Gibbs until Coombs' death in 1909.

Coombs became successful designing residences and institutional buildings throughout Lewiston, its twin city Auburn, and across the state, working in the prevailing Second Empire, Romanesque Revival and Queen Anne styles.

== Personal life ==
Coombs was married in 1873 to Clara Coffin of East Harpswell, Maine. They had two sons: Fred Hamilton Coombs (1874–1932) and Harry Stevens Coombs (1878–1939), both of whom would work in their father's office.

In 1889 and 1890 Coombs was a member of the Lewiston City Council.

Coombs died March 26, 1909, of pneumonia in Lewiston at the age of 57.

== Legacy ==
After Coombs' death, his office survived. It was first continued by his son, Harry S. Coombs, and Gibbs under its former name of Coombs & Gibbs. This was dissolved in 1910 and succeeded by Coombs and his elder brother, Fred H. Coombs, as Coombs Brothers. In 1912 it was succeeded by the younger Coombs alone. In 1928 he formed a partnership, Coombs & Harriman, with Alonzo J. Harriman, and retired in 1938. Harriman and his successors continued the firm in Auburn, which today (2022) is known simply as Harriman.

Many of his works, alone and with his partners, have been listed on the United States National Register of Historic Places. Others contribute to listed historic districts.

== Designs ==
Kimball & Coombs, 1874:

- Albert F. Ames House, 73 Talbot Ave., Rockland, ME (1874)

Private practice, 1874-1875:

- George C. Chase House, 16 Frye St., Lewiston, ME (1874)

Stevens & Coombs, 1875-1880:

- William Bradford House, 54 Pine St., Lewiston, ME (1876) - Demolished 2007.
- Farwell Bleachery, 39 S. Canal St., Lawrence, MA (1876–77) - Burned 1994.
- Odd Fellows Block, 182–190 Lisbon St., Lewiston, ME (1876)
- Edward Little High School, 30 Academy St., Auburn, ME (1877–78) - Demolished.
- Charles Gay House, 64 Highland Ave., Auburn, ME (1878)
- Lewiston Water Works, 38 Island Ave., Lewiston, ME (1878) - Only the gatehouse remains.
- Auburn Engine House, 158 Court St., Auburn, ME (1879)
- Chapel, S. Shore Ave., Squirrel Island, ME (1879–80)

Private practice, 1880-1896:

- Dominican Block, 143 Lincoln St., Lewiston, ME (1882)
- Music Hall Block, 200 Broadway, Farmington, ME (1882–83)
- Louis J. Martel House, 122 Bartlett St. Lewiston, ME (1883)
- Lothrop L. Blake House, 364 Main St., Lewiston, ME (1885)
- Franklin County Courthouse, 140 Main St., Farmington, ME (1885)
- First Congregational Church, 235 Main St., Farmington, ME (1887–88)
- Savings Bank Block, 214 Broadway, Farmington, ME (1887)
- Joseph H. Manley Cottage, 32 Club Rd., Small Point, ME (1888)
- Charles L. Cushman House, 8 Cushman Pl., Auburn, ME (1889)
- Harlow and Sanborn Pavilions, Maine Insane Hospital, Augusta, ME (1889–90) - Sanborn demolished.
- Oak Street School, 36 Oak St., Lewiston, ME (1890)
- Albert M. Penley House, 233 Main St., Auburn, ME (1890)
- Cole Block, 19 Main St., Bethel, ME (1891)
- Callahan Building, 276 Lisbon St. Lewiston ME (1892)
- Walter Dingley House, 46 Elm St., Auburn, ME (1892)
- Bradford Peck House, 506 Main St., Lewiston, ME (1893)
- Norway Savings Bank Block, 300-306 Main St., Norway, ME (1894)
- L. Linn Small House, 11 Elm St., Auburn, ME (1894)
- Holman Day House, 2 Goff St., Auburn, ME (1895)
- Oxford County Courthouse, 26 Western Ave., South Paris, ME (1895)

Coombs, Gibbs & Wilkinson, 1896-1900:

- Peck's Dept. Store, 184 Main St., Lewiston, ME (1896)
- James A. Walsh House, 253 Pine St., Lewiston, ME (1896)
- Joseph Holman House, 227 Main St., Farmington, ME (1897)
- Merrill Hall, Farmington State Normal School, Farmington ME (1897–98)
- Lewiston Trust and Safe Deposit Building, 46 Lisbon St., Lewiston, ME (1898)
- Bank Building, 38 Main St., Livermore Falls, ME (1899-1900)

Coombs & Gibbs, 1900-1910:

- John D. Clifford House, 460 Main St., Lewiston, ME (1900)
- Mt. Kineo House (Remodeling) and Cottages, Northwest Piscataquis, ME (1900) - Hotel demolished.
- Masonic (Gateway) Building, 11 Lisbon St., Lewiston, ME (1901–02)
- George Bonnallie House, 485 Main St., Lewiston, ME (1902)
- Lewiston Public Library, Park & Pine Sts. Lewiston, ME (1902)
- First National Bank Building, 157 Main St., Lewiston, ME (1903)
- Fort Fairfield High School, Main & School Sts., Fort Fairfield, ME (1903) - Demolished.
- Maine Trust and Banking Co. Building, 192 Water St., Gardiner, ME (1903) - Altered.
- First National Bank Building, 18 Market Sq., Houlton, ME (1907)
- Kennebec County Courthouse Annex, 95 State St., Augusta, ME (1907)
- Philo Reed House, Main St., Fort Fairfield, ME (1907)
- Wallace H. White House, 449 Main St., Lewiston, ME (1907)
- Kora Temple, 11 Sabattus St., Lewiston, ME (1908–10)
- Clifford Building, 217 Main St., Lewiston, ME (1909)
- Gray and Staples Halls, Maine School for the Feeble-Minded, New Gloucester, ME (1909)
- Norway Grange No. 45, 15 Whitman St., Norway, ME (1909)
- Callahan Block, 282 Lisbon St., Lewiston, ME (1910)
- Main Building, Central Maine General Hospital, Lewiston, ME (1910)

== Gallery ==
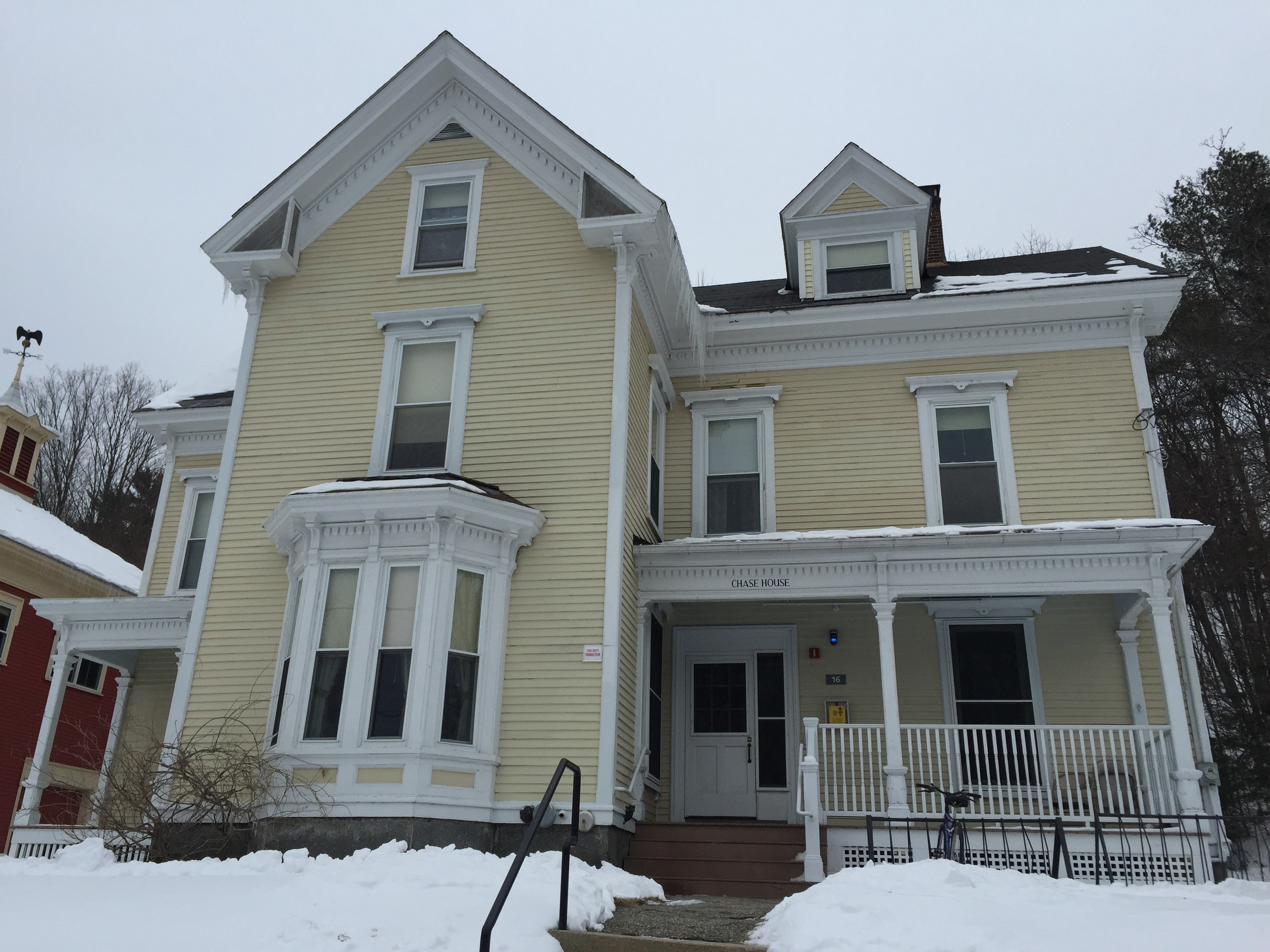
George C. Chase House, Lewiston, 1874.

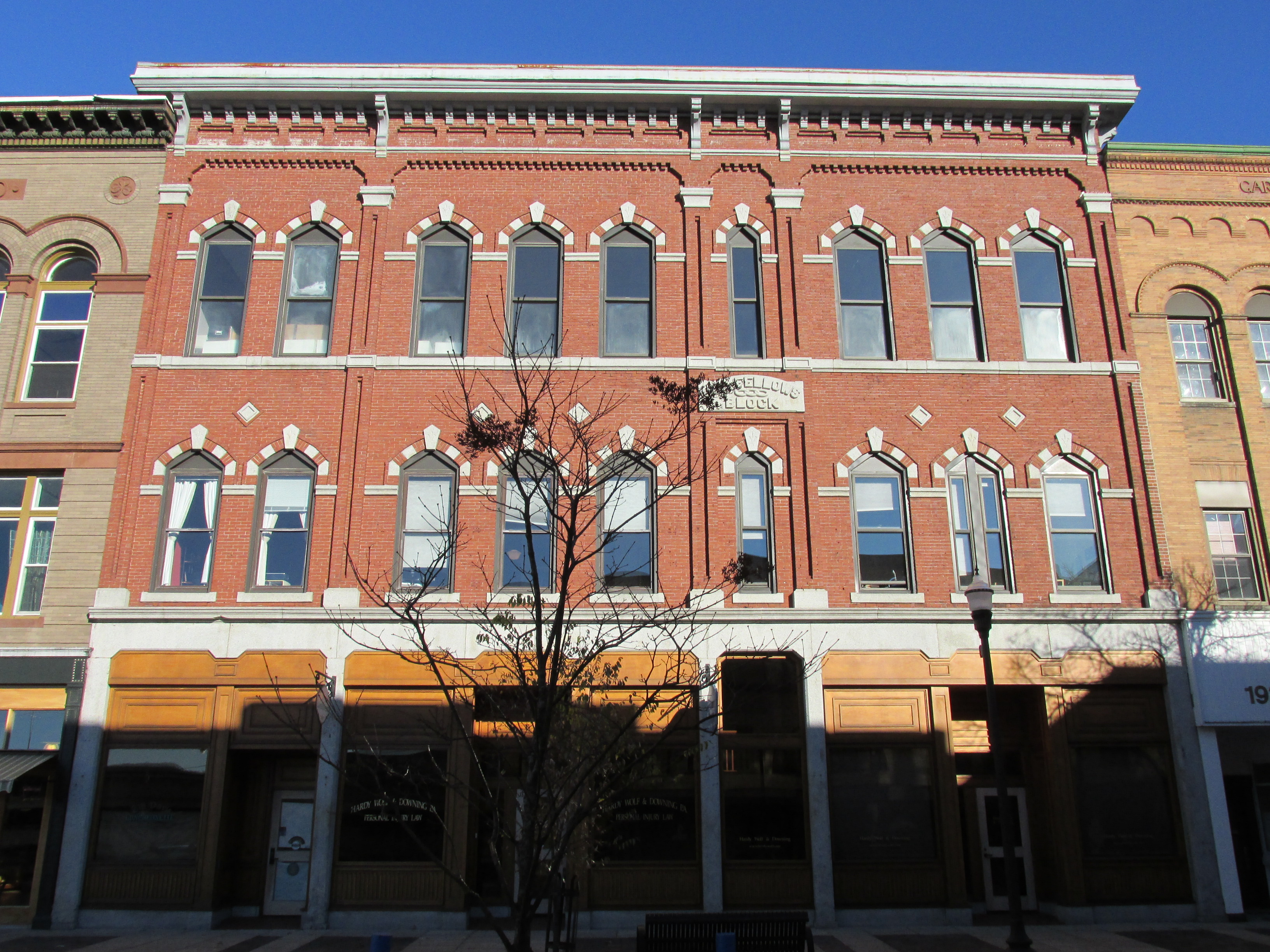
Odd Fellows Block, Lewiston, 1876.

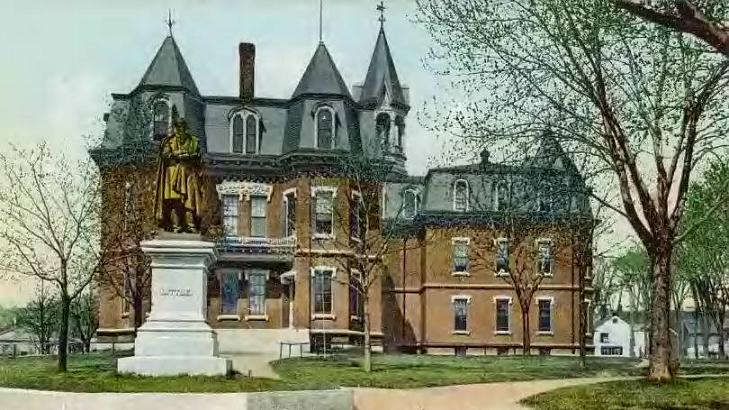
Edward Little High School, Auburn, 1877.

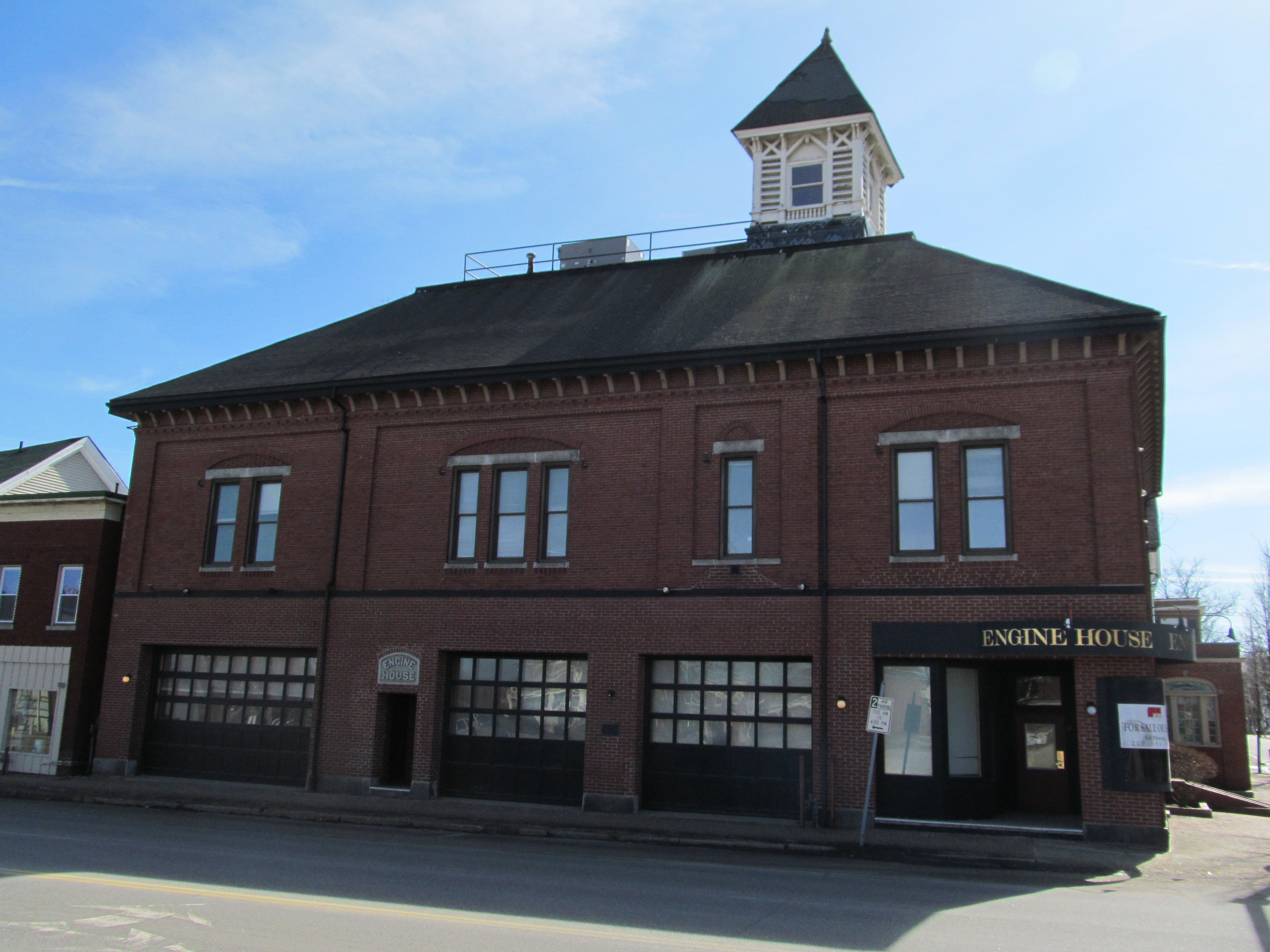
Auburn Engine House, Auburn, 1879.

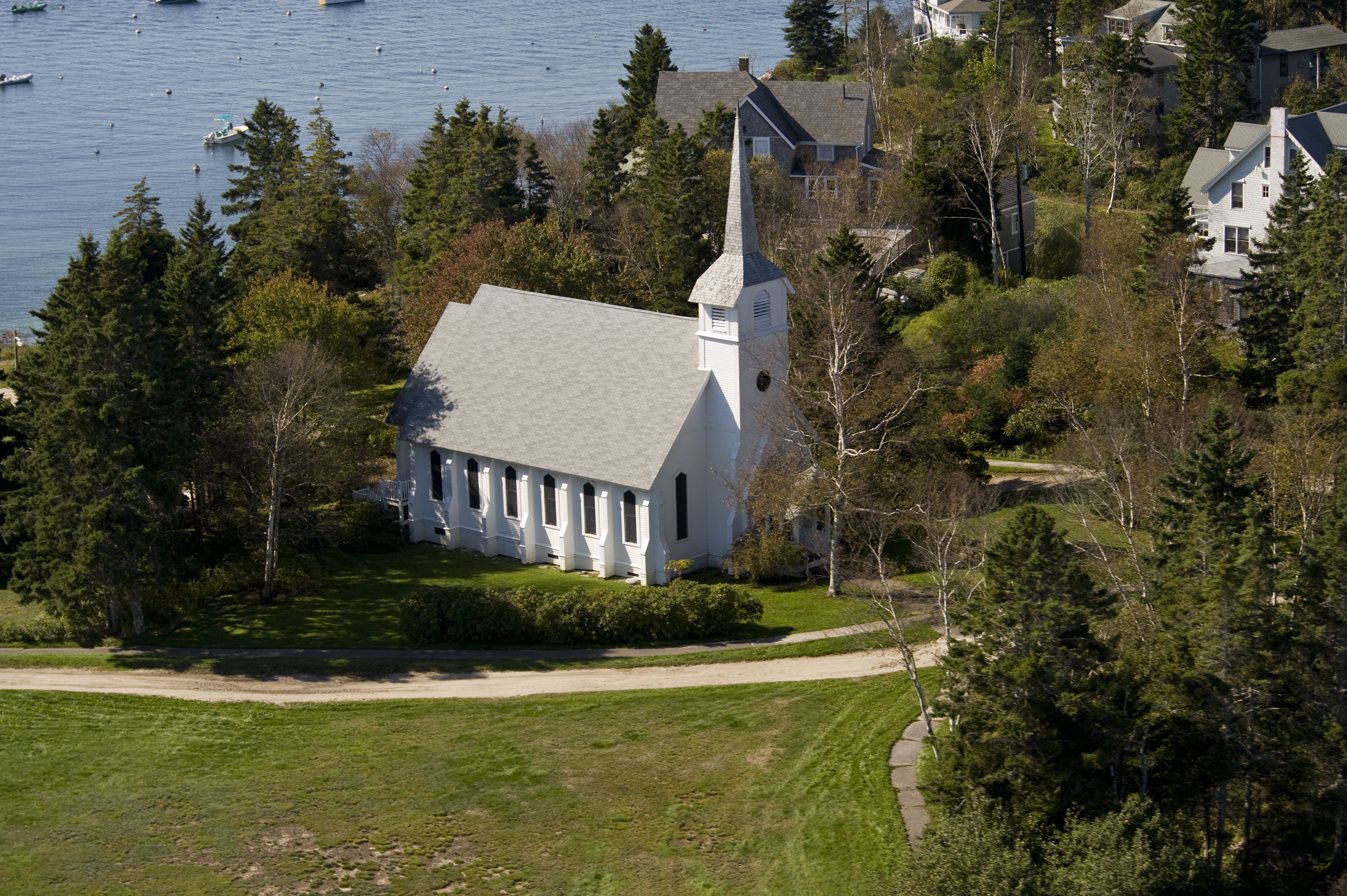
Chapel, Squirrel Island, 1879.

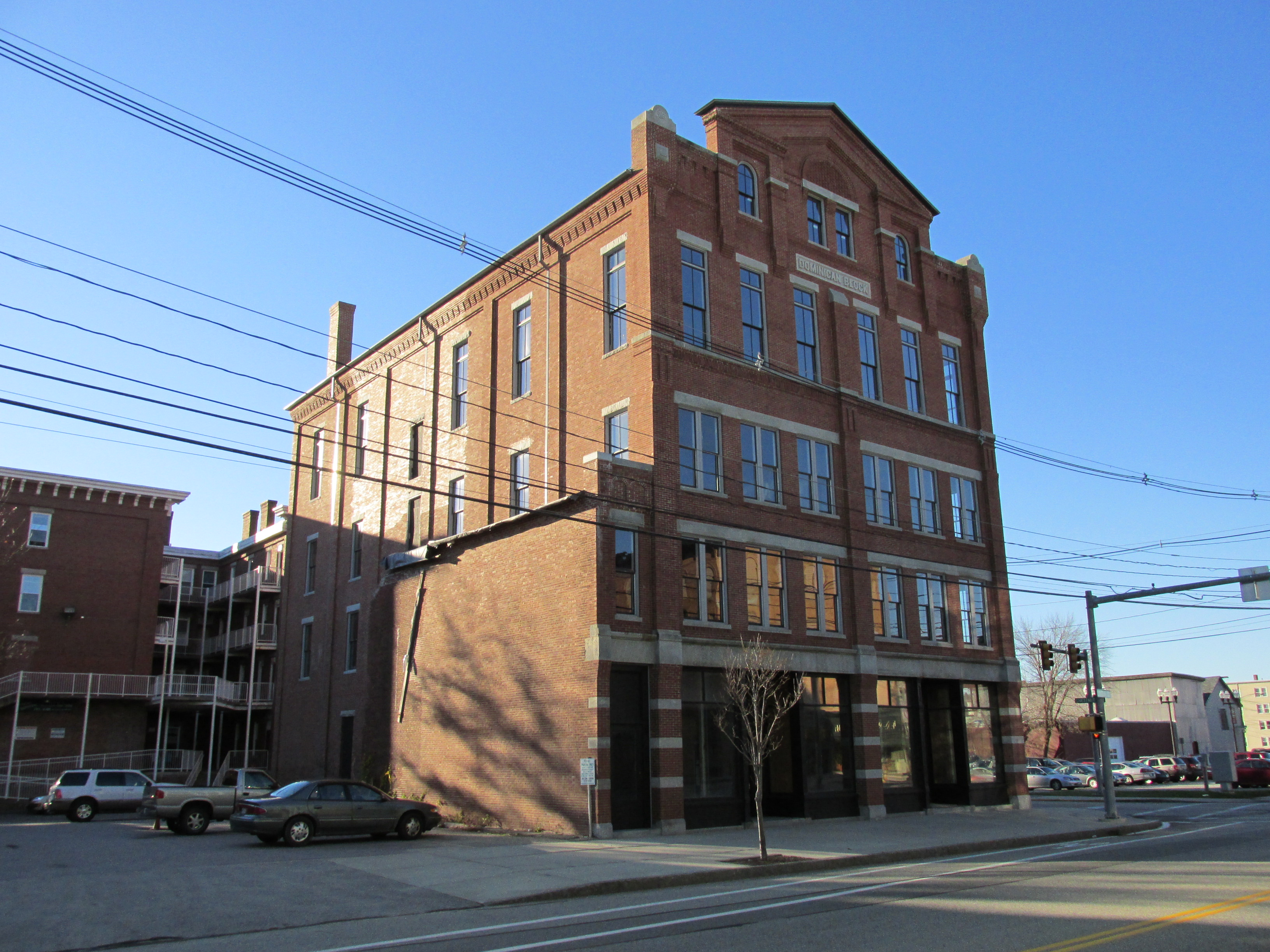
Dominican Block, Lewiston, 1882.

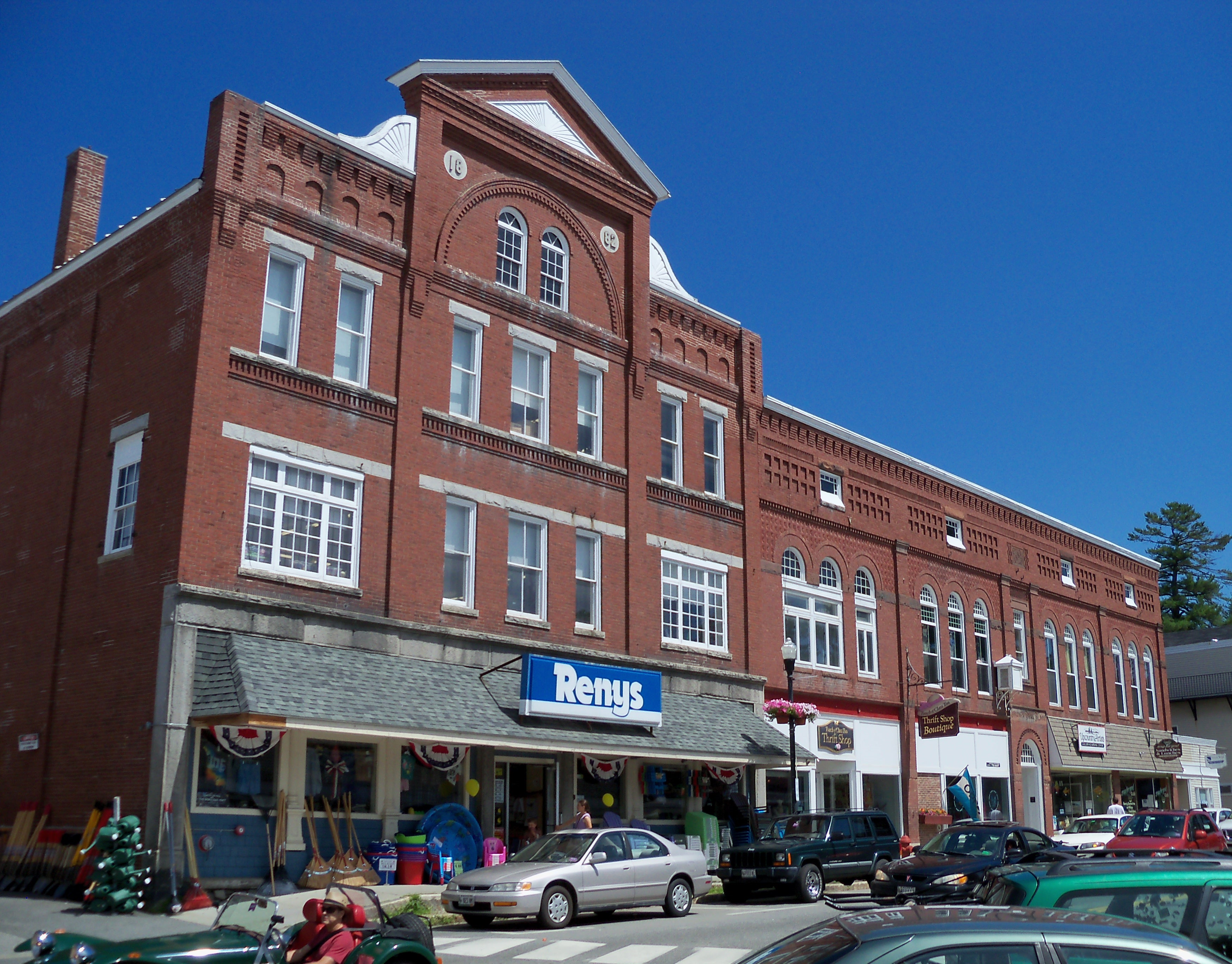
Music Hall and Savings Bank Blocks, Farmington, 1882 and 1887.

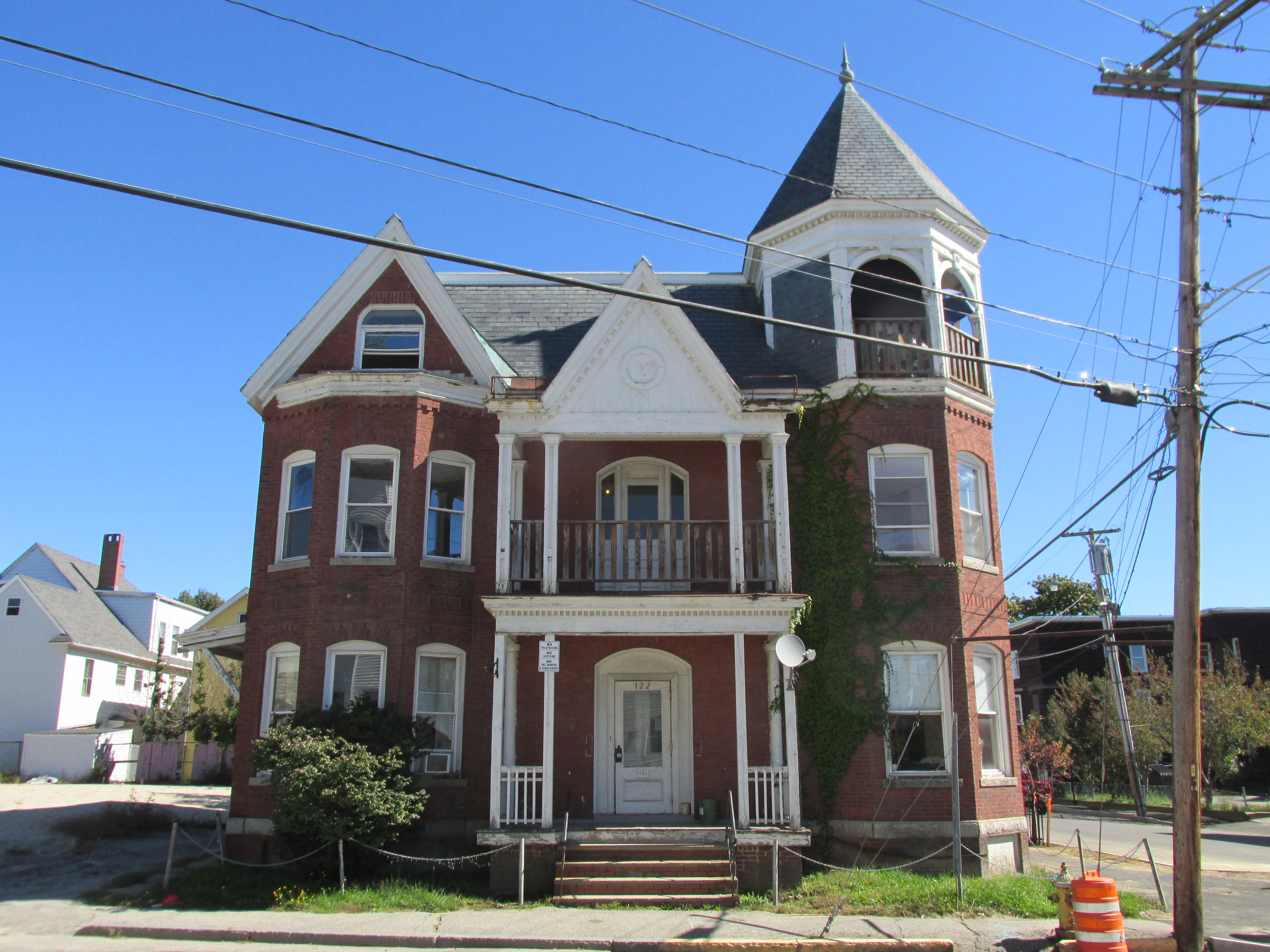
Louis J. Martel House, Lewiston, 1883.

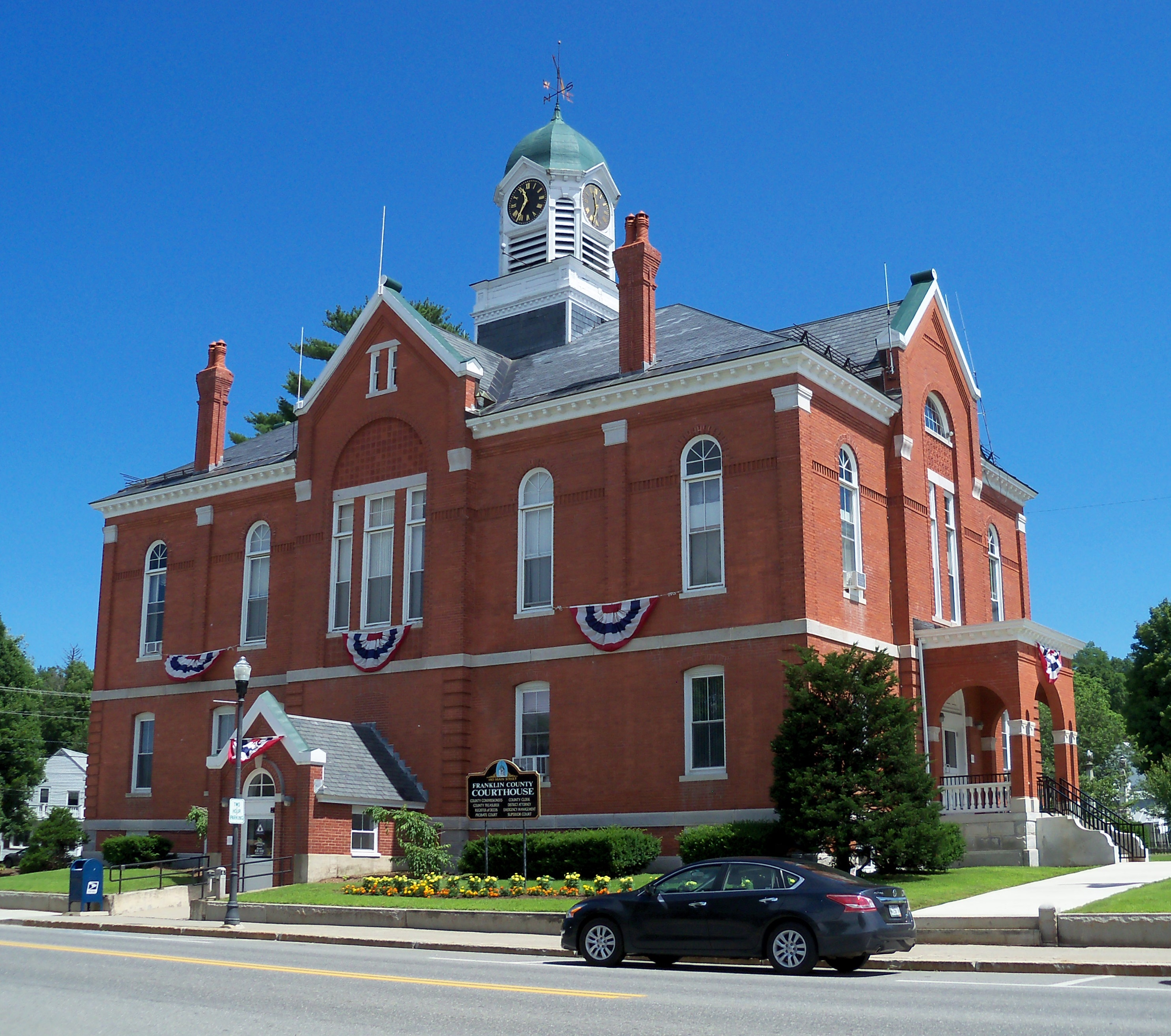
County Courthouse, Farmington, 1885.

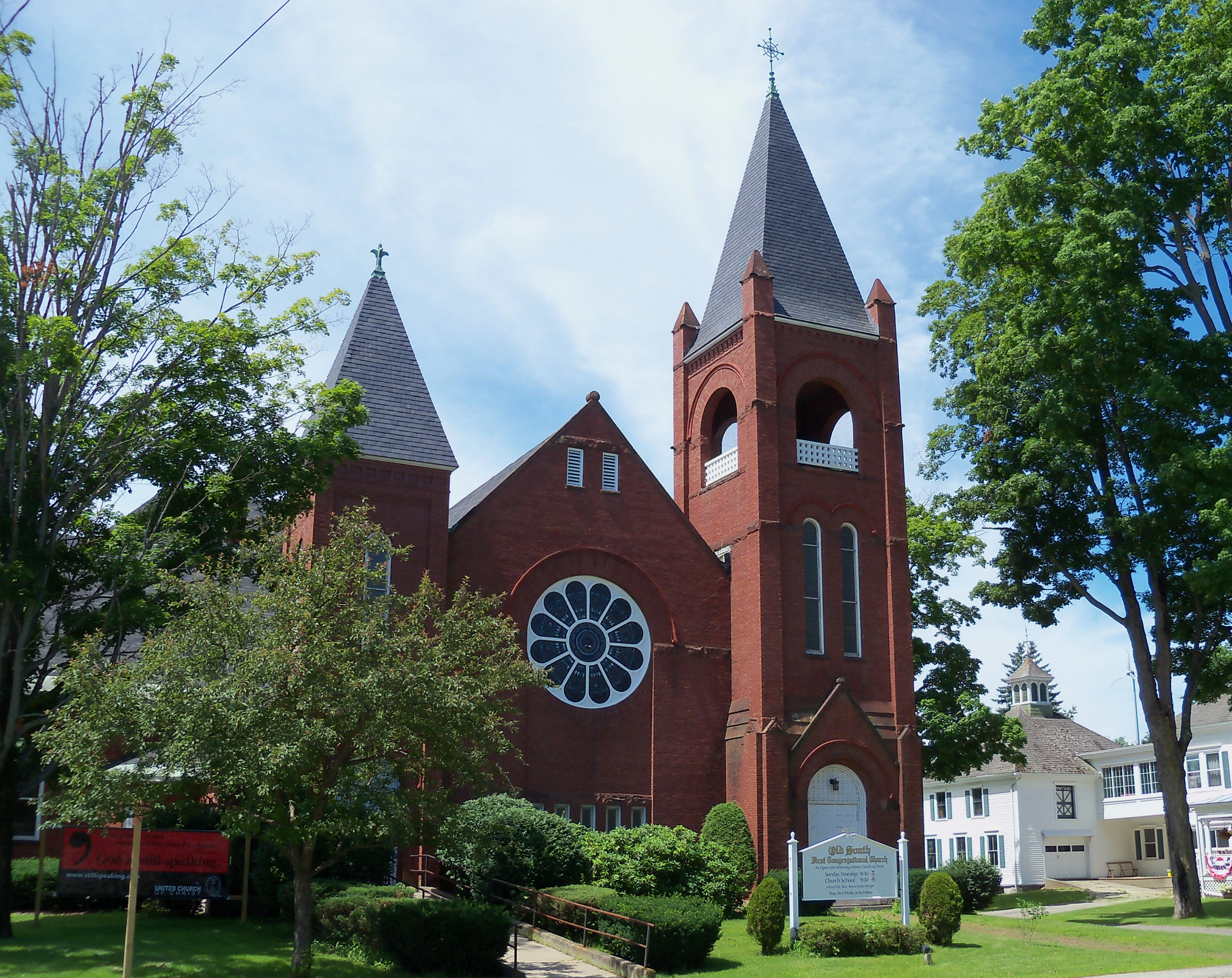
First Congregational Church, Farmington, 1887.

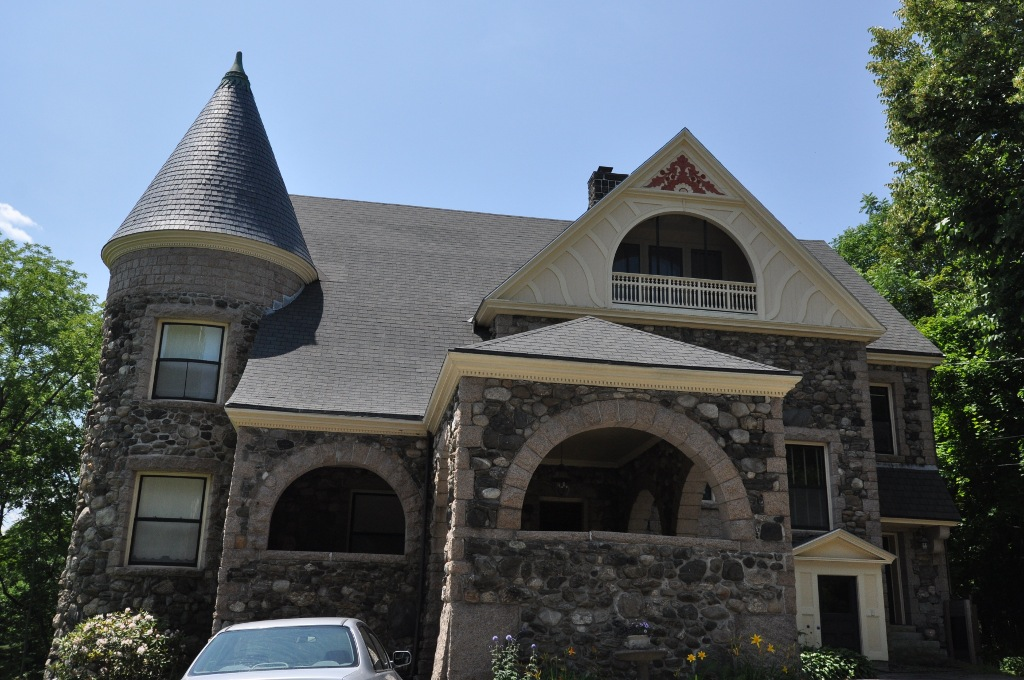
Charles L. Cushman House, Auburn, 1889.

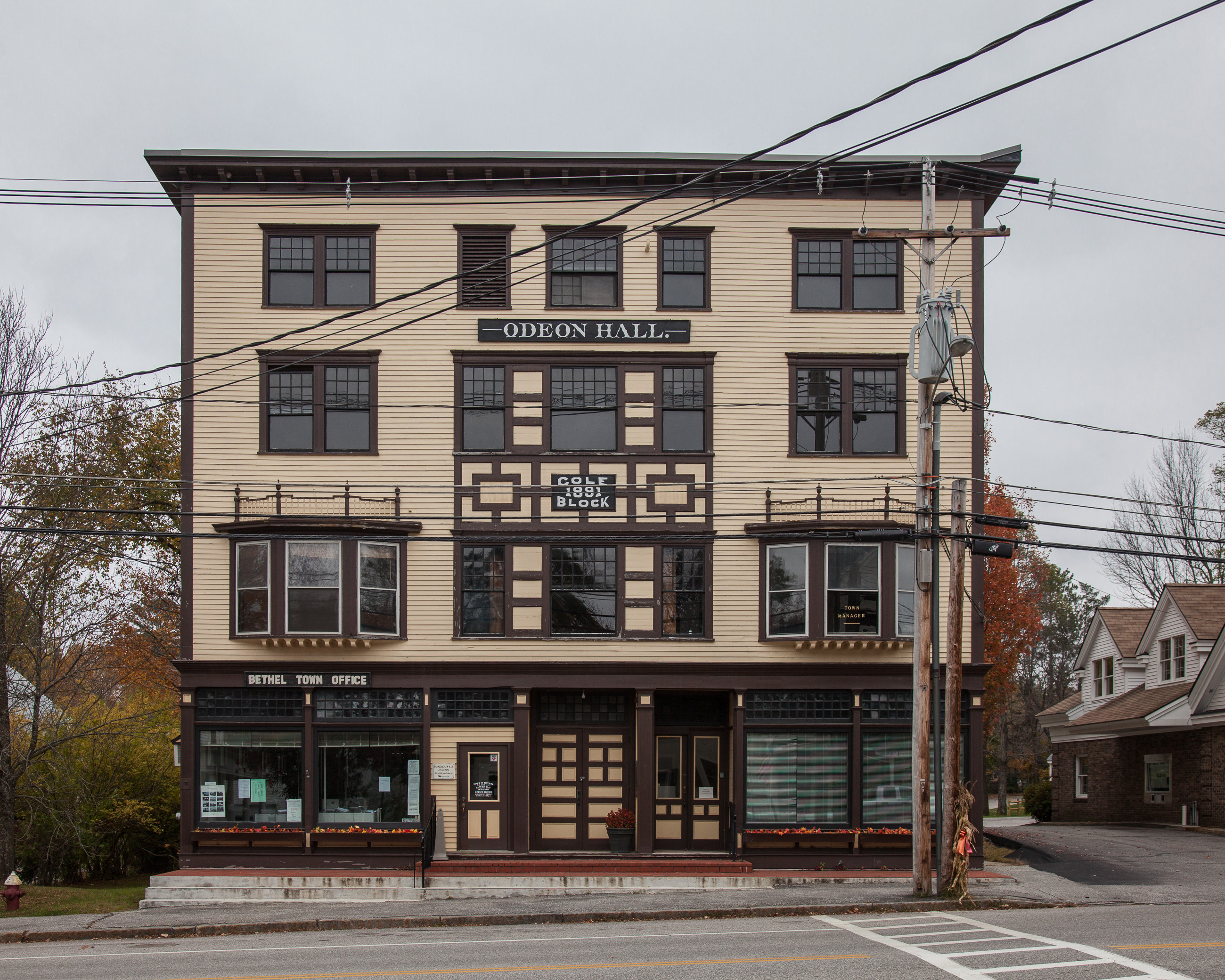
Cole Block, Bethel, 1891.

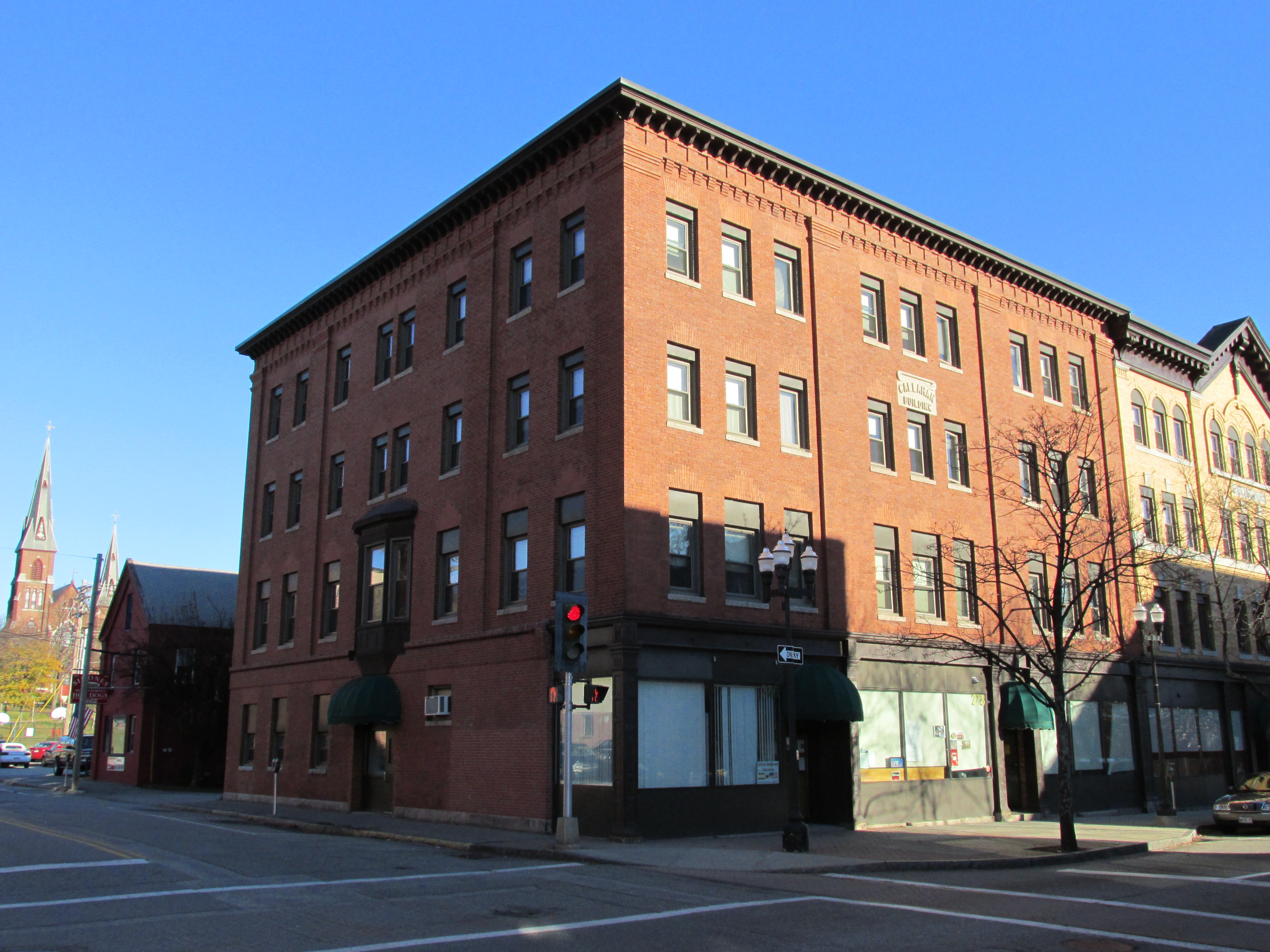
Callahan Building, Lewiston, 1892.

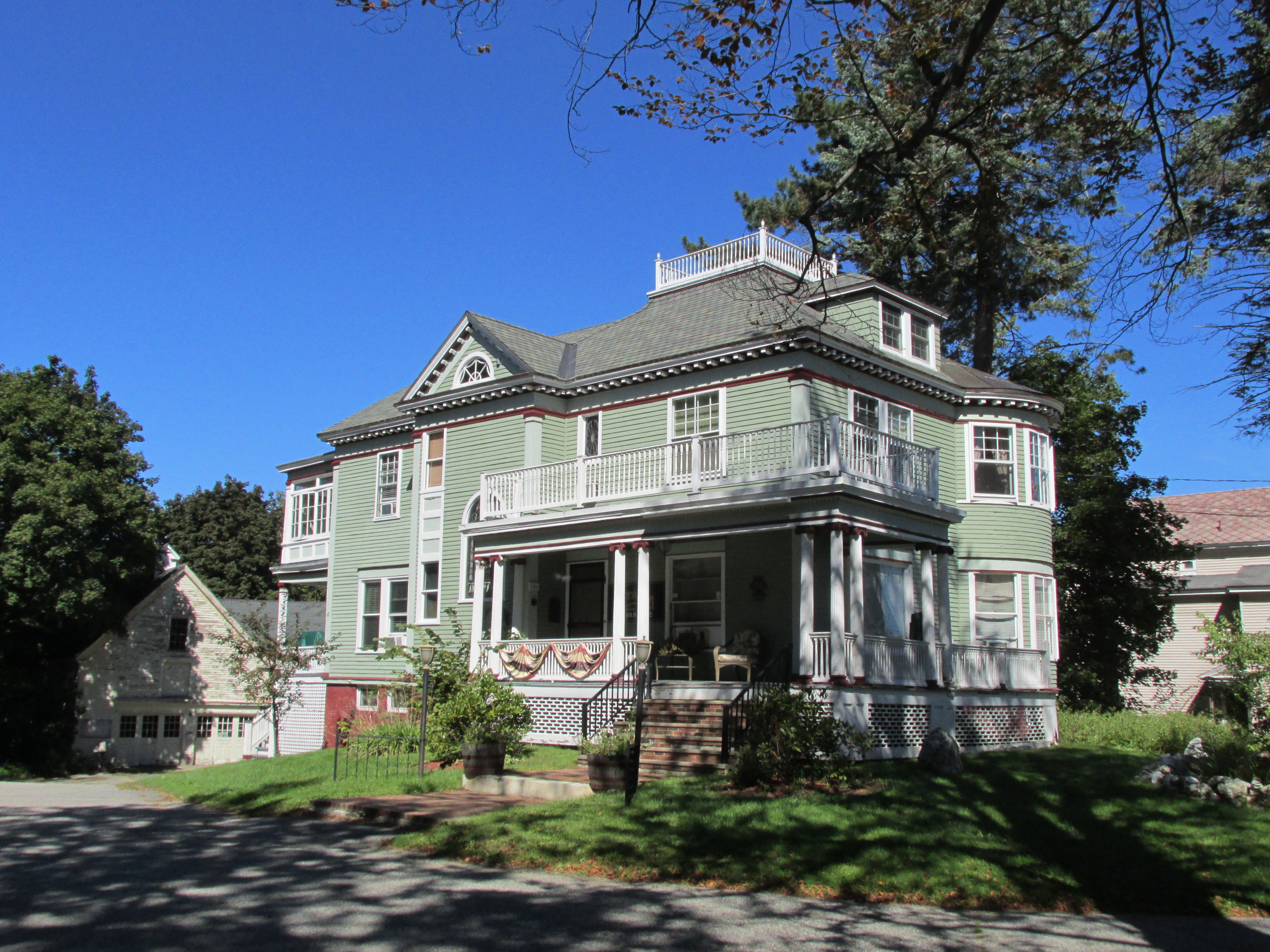
Bradford Peck House, Lewiston, 1893.

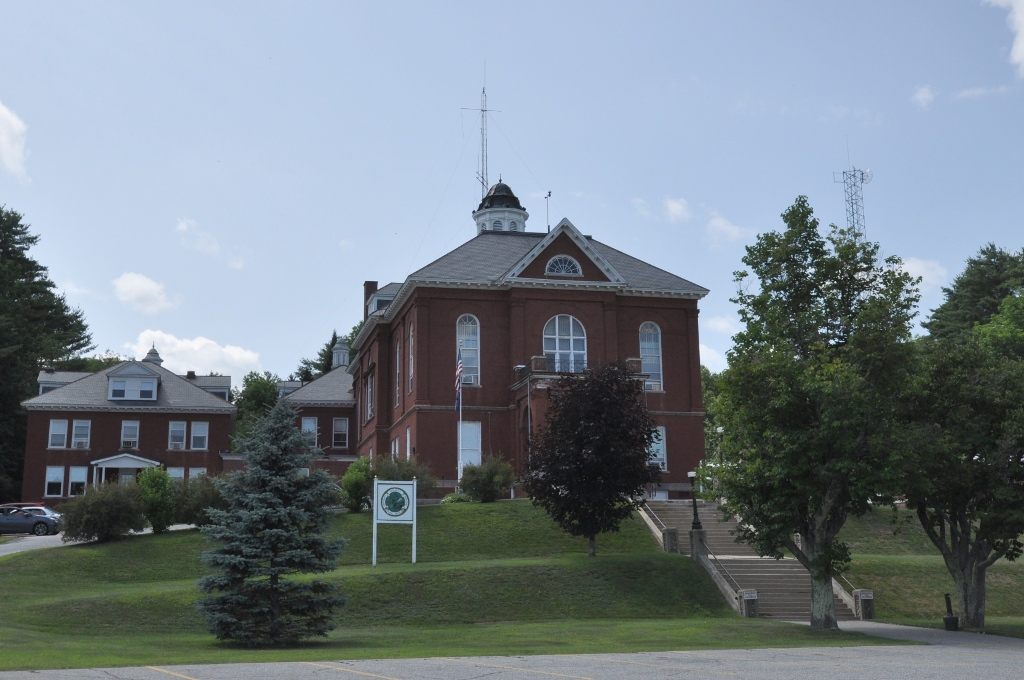
Oxford County Courthouse, South Paris, 1895.

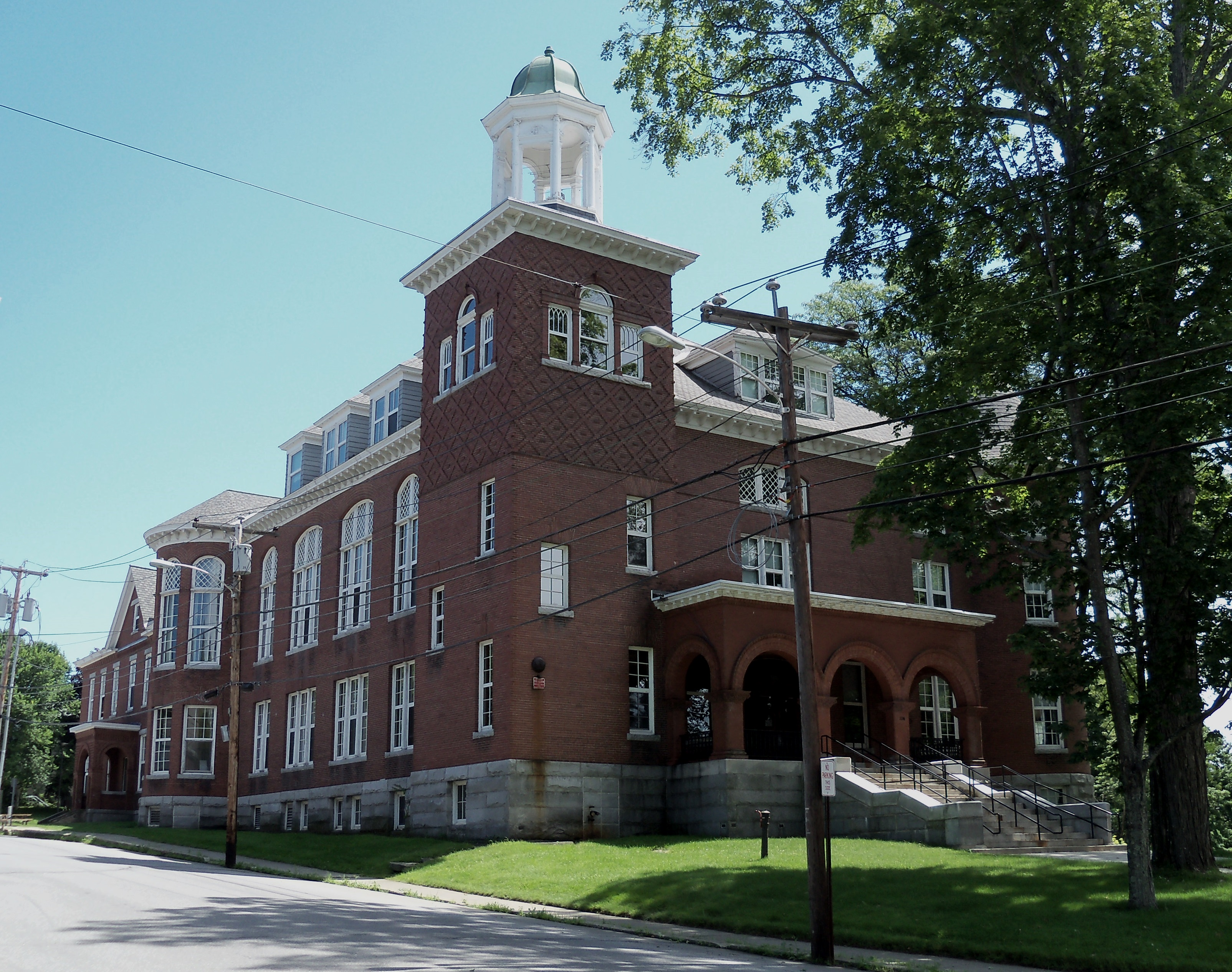
Merrill Hall, Farmington State, 1897.

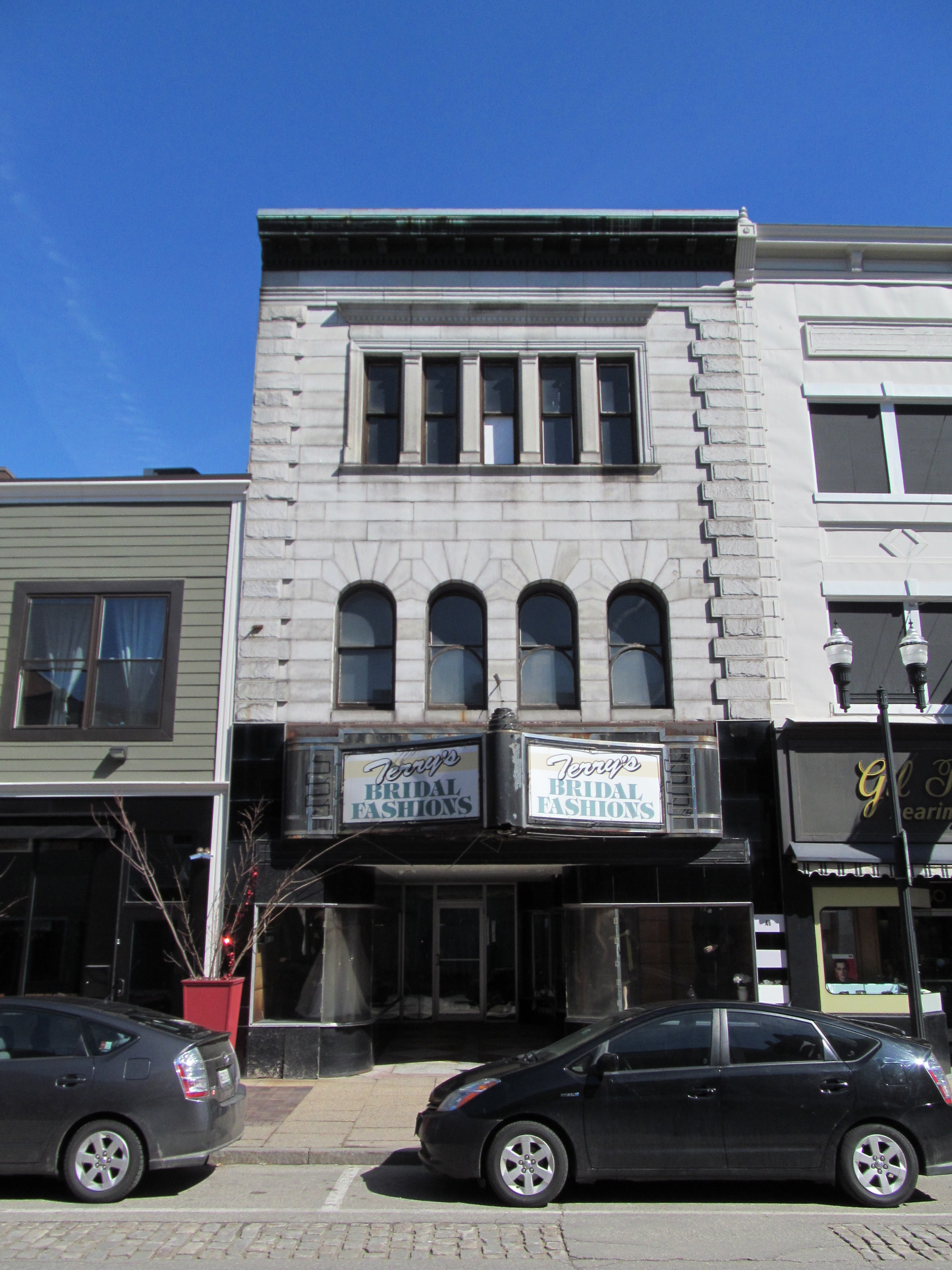
Lewiston Trust and Safe Deposit Building, Lewiston, 1898.

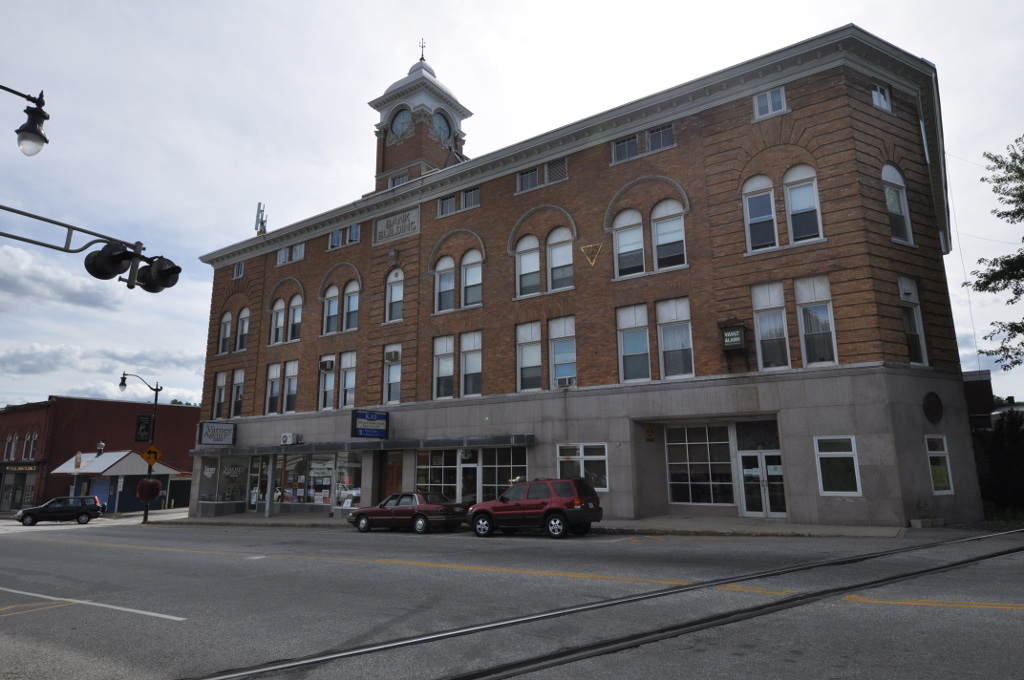
Bank Building, Livermore Falls, 1899.

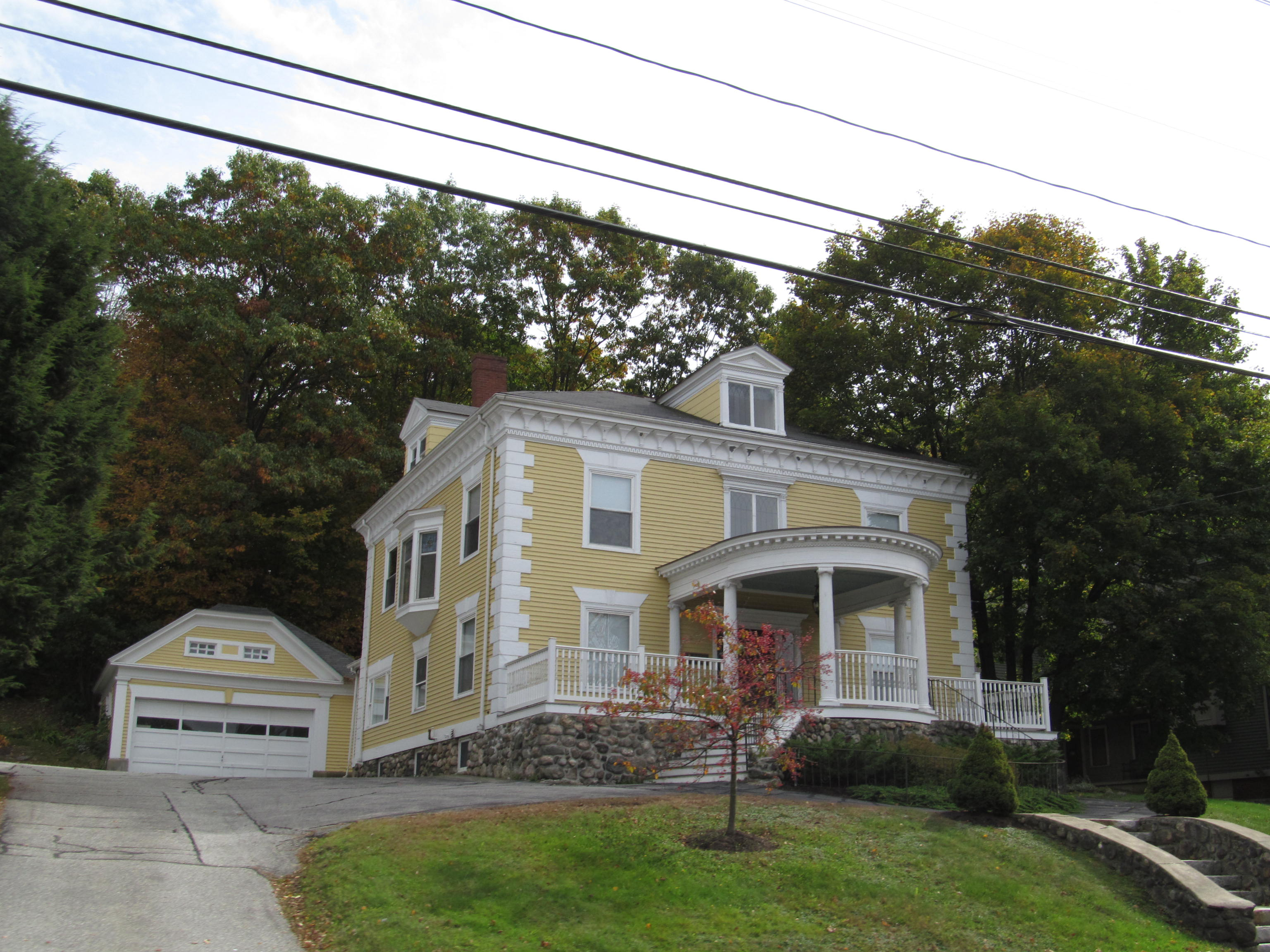
George Bonnallie House, Lewiston, 1902.

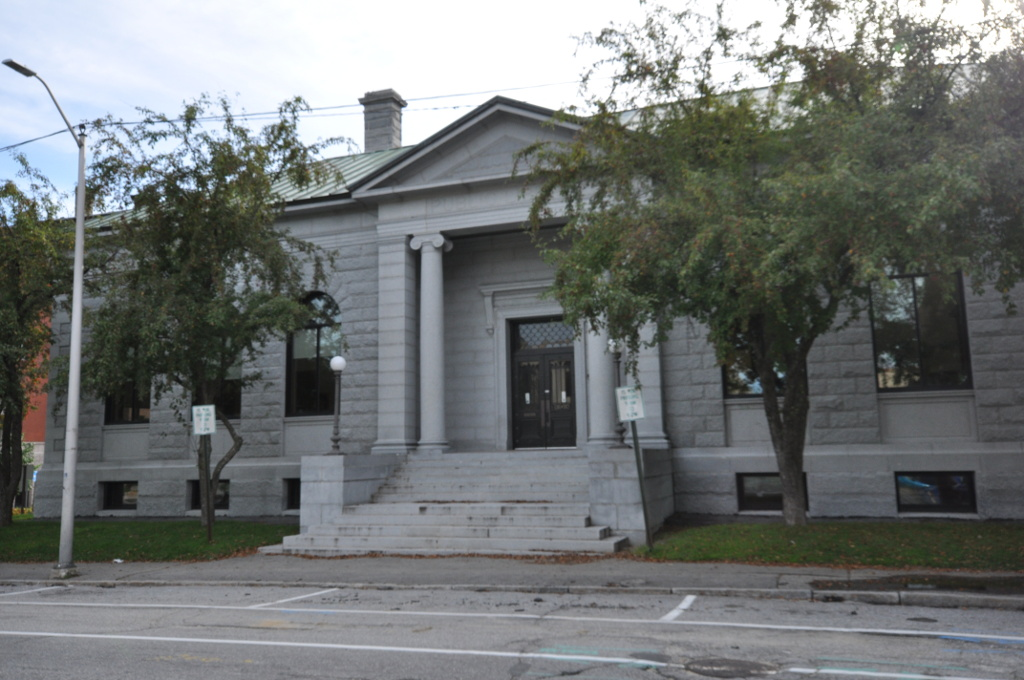
Lewiston Public Library, Lewiston, 1902.

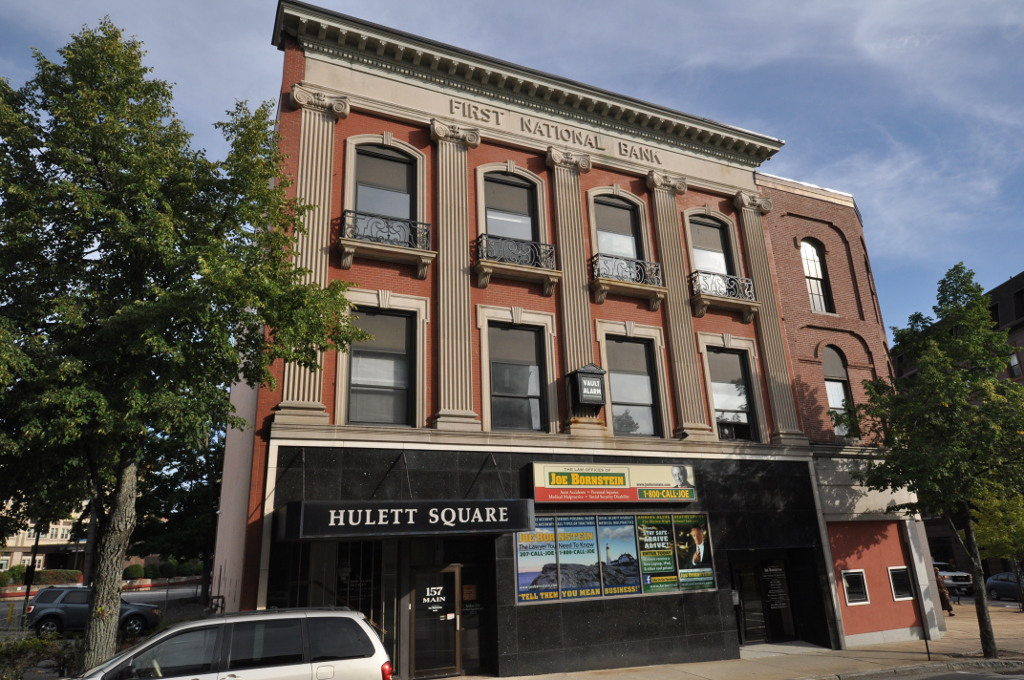
First National Bank Building, Lewiston, 1903.

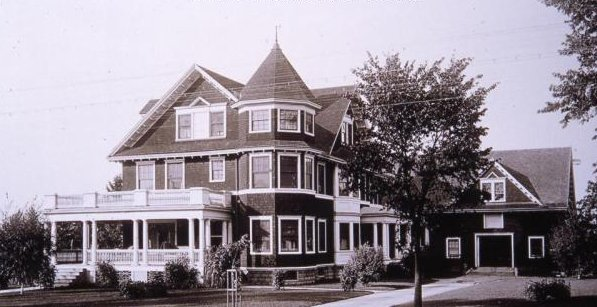
Philo Reed House, Fort Fairfield, 1907.

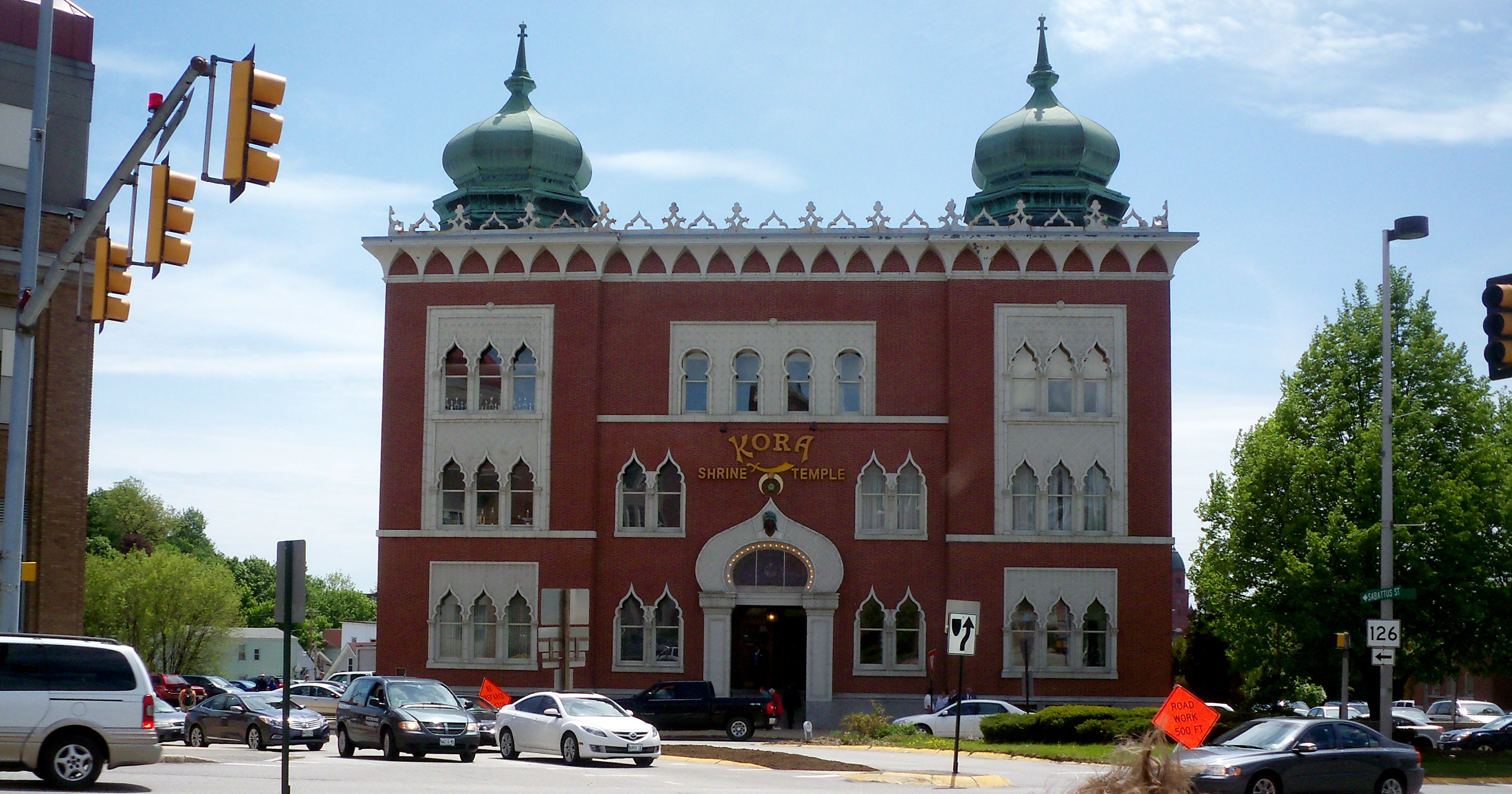
Kora Temple, Lewiston, 1908.

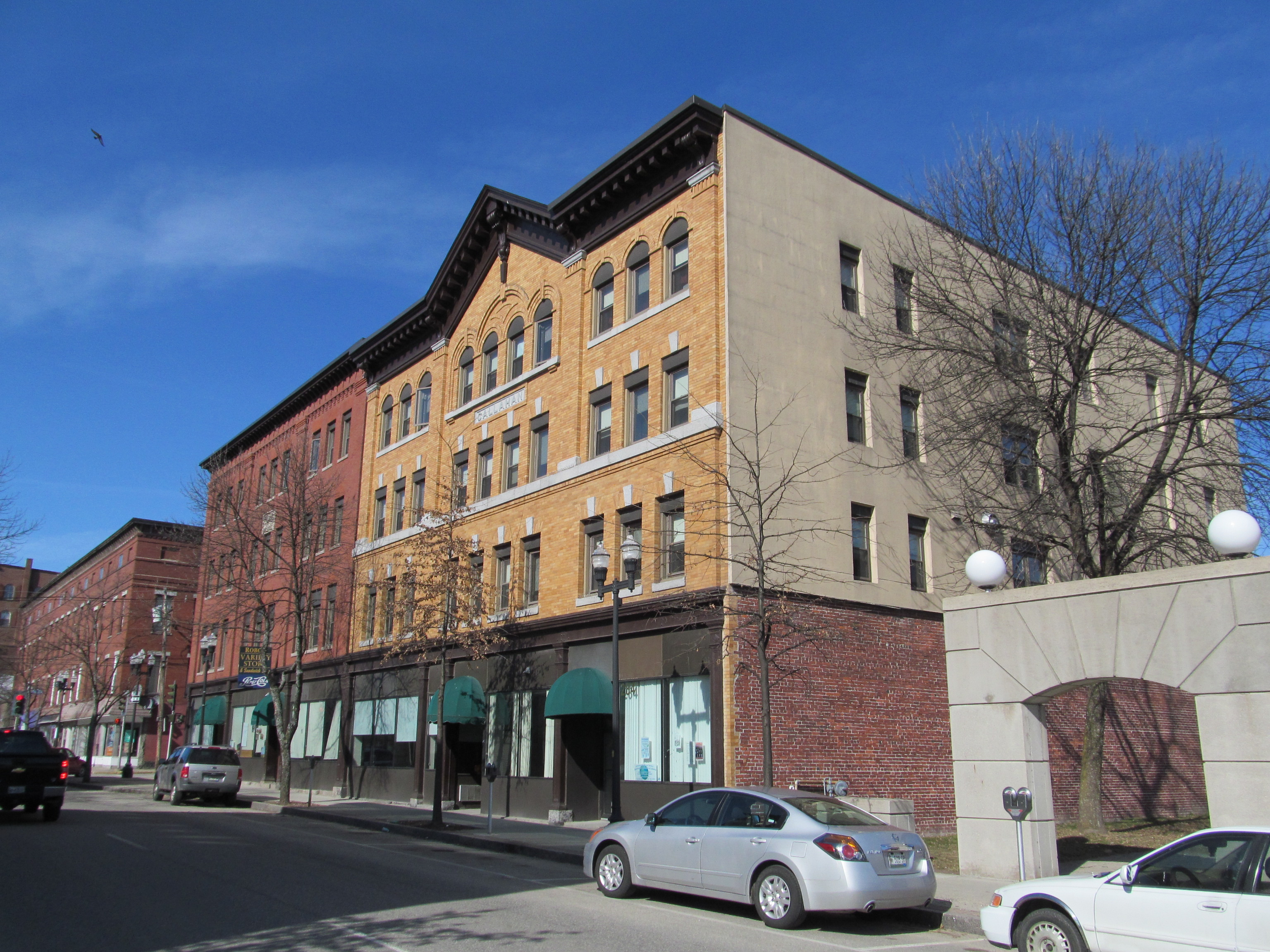
Callahan Block, Lewiston, 1910.
