= First Callahan Building =

- U.S. National Register of Historic Places
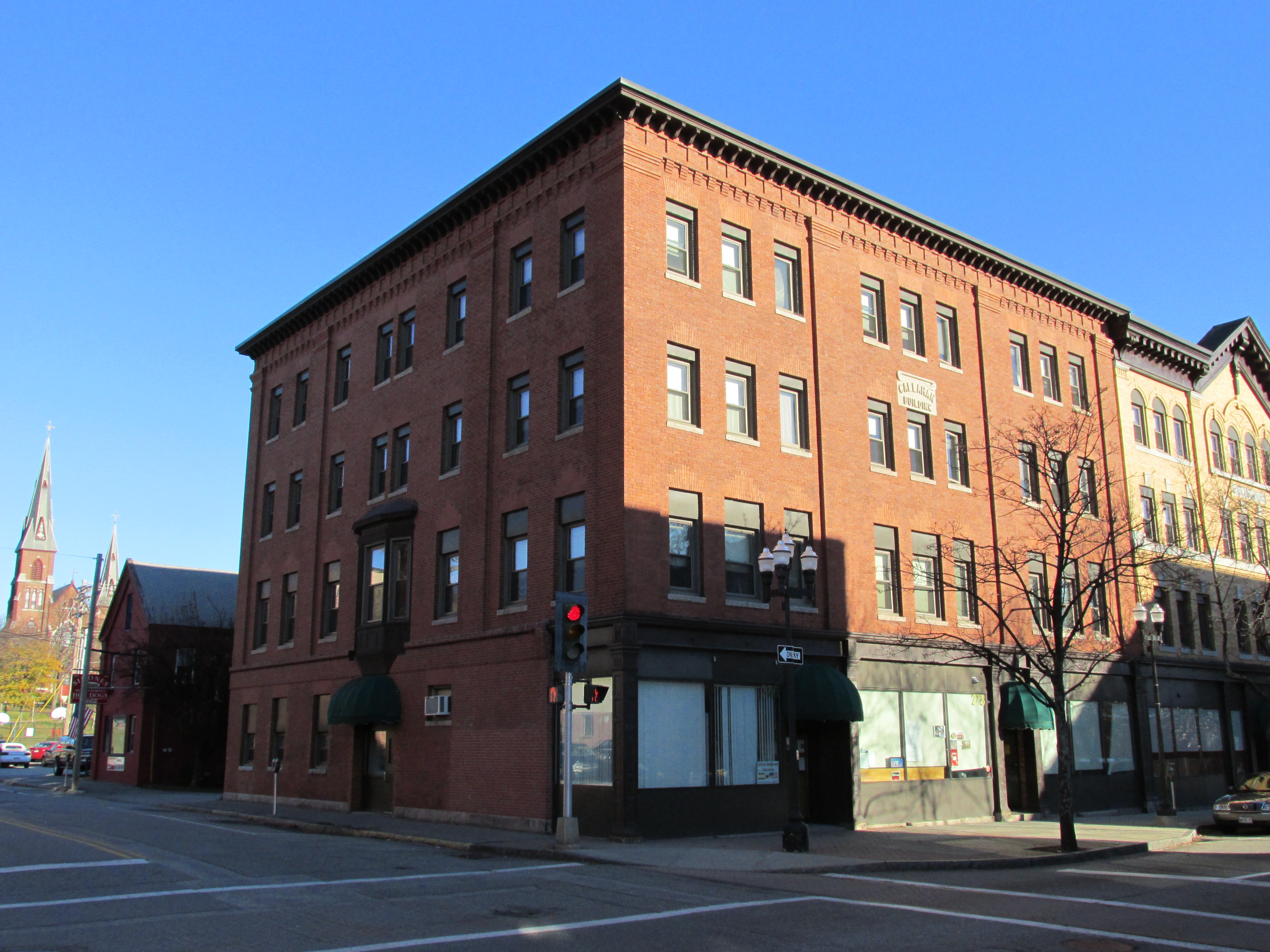
- First Callahan Building

- Location within Maine Location within the United States
- Location: 276 Lisbon Street, Lewiston, Maine
- Coordinates: 44°5′39″N 70°12′58″W
- Area: less than one acre
- Built: 1892
- Architect: Coombs, George
- Architectural style: Renaissance
- MPS: Lewiston Commercial District MRA
- NRHP reference No.: 86002280
- Added to NRHP: April 25, 1986

The First Callahan Building is an historic commercial and residential building at 276 Lisbon Street in Lewiston, Maine. Built in 1892 to a design by noted local architect George M. Coombs, the Renaissance Revival brick building was part of a major development on the city's main commercial street by the Callahan brothers, owners of a local gentleman's furnishings store. The building was listed on the National Register of Historic Places in 1986.

== Description and history ==
The First Callahan Building is located on the east side of Lisbon Street in Lewiston's principal downtown commercial district. It is located adjacent to the Second Callahan Block (at number 282), and across from the Lower Lisbon Street Historic District, which encompasses Lewiston's earliest commercial development. It is a four-story red brick with a flat roof that has an extended bracketed cornice above a brickwork entablature. The main facade, facing Lisbon Street, is nine bays wide, divided into three groups by metal pilasters at the first floor level, and brick pilasters above. The first floor has three modern storefronts, while the upper floors have sash windows set in flat-topped openings with granite sills. Access to the upper floors is via an entrance on Chestnut Street, whose facade matches in detailing that facing Lisbon Street.

This building was designed by noted local architect George M. Coombs (who designed numerous buildings across northern and western Maine), and was built in 1892 for T. F. and Eugene Callahan, brothers who operated a shop providing hats, trunks, and other furnishings for gentlemen. The building originally house retail establishments on the ground floor, and offices and residences above; the upper levels have been rehabilitated for exclusive residential use. The Callahan brothers were apparently financially successful, since they were able to build the adjacent block in 1911; it was designed by Coombs' son-in-law and successor, Eugene Gibbs.

== See also ==
- National Register of Historic Places listings in Androscoggin County, Maine
