= Dominican Block =

- U.S. National Register of Historic Places
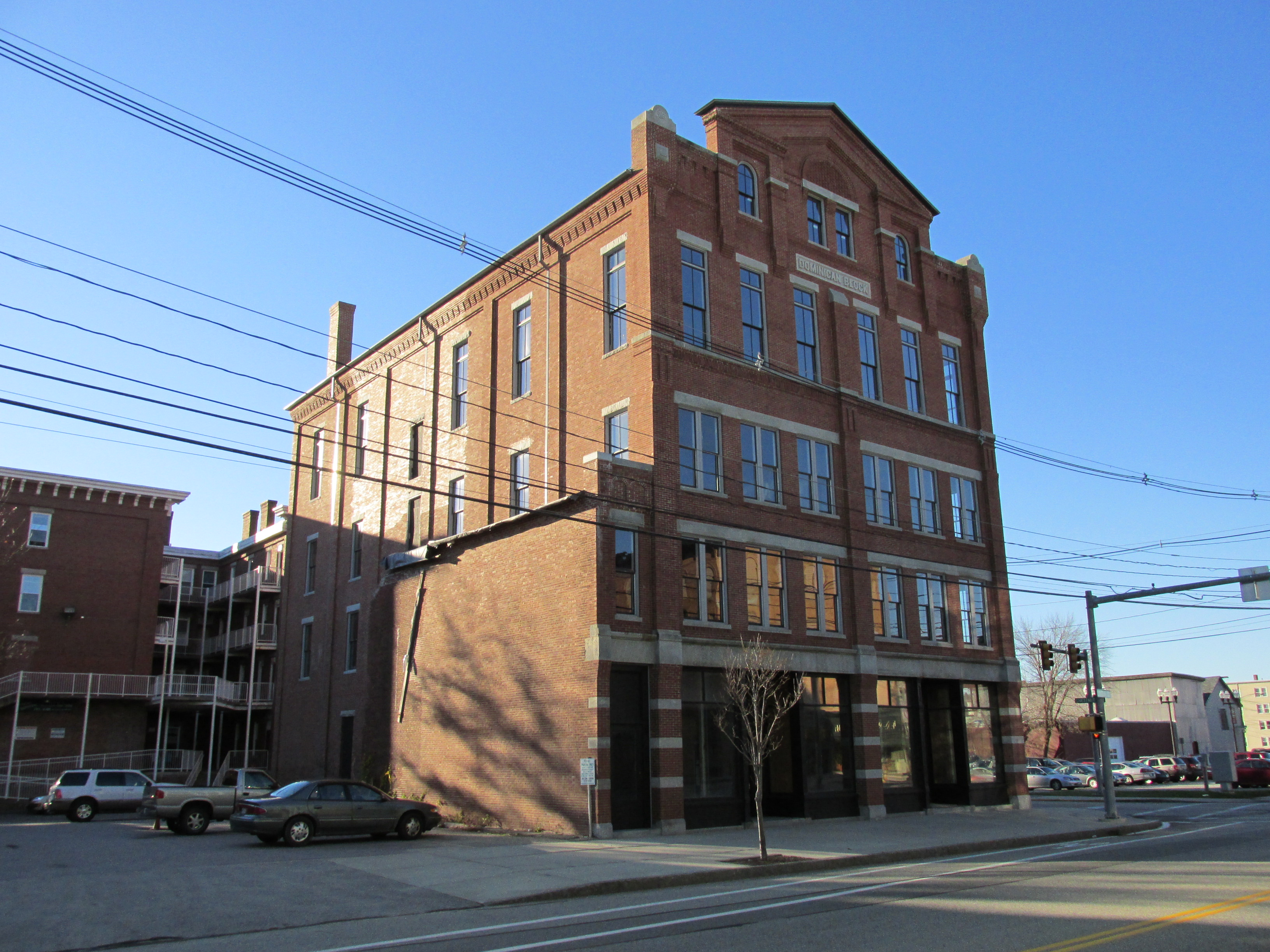
- Dominican Block

- Location within Maine Location within the United States
- Location: 141-145 Lincoln Street, Lewiston, Maine
- Coordinates: 44°5′34″N 70°13′10″W
- Built: 1882
- Architect: Coombs, George M.
- Architectural style: Queen Anne
- NRHP reference No.: 80000212
- Added to NRHP: January 15, 1980

The Dominican Block is an historic multifunction building at 141-145 Lincoln Street in Lewiston, Maine. The Queen Anne style block was built in 1882 to a design by the noted local architect George M. Coombs, and was for many years one of the primary social centers for the city's burgeoning French-American community. It was listed on the National Register of Historic Places in 1980.

== Description and history ==
The Dominican Block is set at the southwest corner of Lincoln and Chestnut Streets, not far from Lewiston's mill complexes. It is a 4 1/2-story structure built out of brick with granite trim. It has two storefronts, separated by piers of alternating brick and granite banding, with an entrance to the upper floors projecting to their left. Above each storefront windows are grouped in threes as the piers continue up to the fourth floor. The half-story at the top consists of a raised central section three bays wide, with an ornate brickwork pediment and round-arch windows in the outer bays.

The building was designed by local architect George M. Coombs and built in 1882. It is architecturally a well-preserved local example of Queen Anne Revival executed in brick, and is stylistically similar to other buildings Coombs designed in Lewiston and elsewhere. It was built by the local Dominican Order to house a variety of social and community services to the city's growing French Catholic population. The area it was built in was known as "Little Canada" at the time, and the building was described by a local newspaper as almost a city hall for the local French-speaking population. When opened, the Dominicans operated a school (providing both religious and secular instruction) on the premises, and it was used for worship, community meetings, and theatrical performances. The building has been in private ownership for many years, converted to more typical business and social functions.

== See also ==
- National Register of Historic Places listings in Androscoggin County, Maine
