= Charles L. Cushman House =

Historic house in Maine, United States

- U.S. National Register of Historic Places
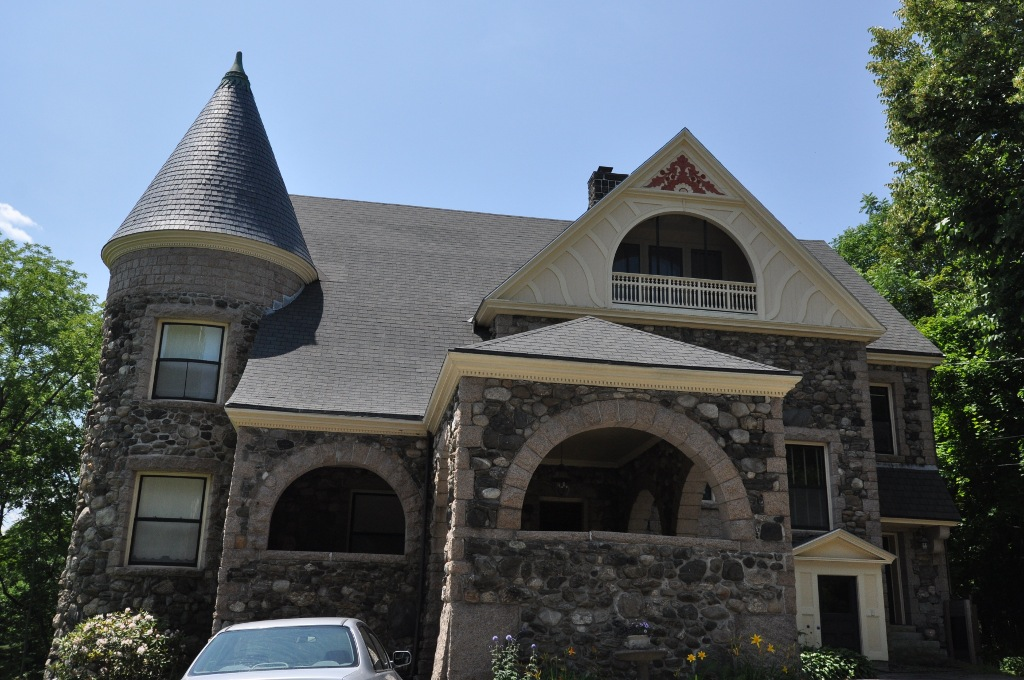

- Location within Maine Location within the United States
- Location: 8 Cushman Pl., Auburn, Maine
- Coordinates: 44°5′25″N 70°13′56″W
- Built: 1888
- Architect: Coombs, George M.
- Architectural style: Queen Anne
- NRHP reference No.: 80000210
- Added to NRHP: June 16, 1980

The Charles L. Cushman House is an historic house at 8 Cushman Place in Auburn, Maine. Built in 1889 for the son of a major local shoe manufacturer, it is unusual as an example of Queen Anne architecture executed in stone, and is one of the finest residential commissions of Lewiston architect George M. Coombs. The house was listed on the National Register of Historic Places in 1980.

== Description and history ==
The Cushman House is set at the southern end of Cushman Place, overlooking the Little Androscoggin River south of Auburn's downtown area. It is a large 2 1/2-story fieldstone structure, with wood and cut granite trim elements. It has a cross-gable roof, and is set on a full basement. Its design includes many characteristic Queen Anne traits, including asymmetrical facades with ornamented gables, multiple porches, a porte-cochere, and an arched window surrounded by wood carvings. A two-story tower with conical roof is set at one corner.

Charles Cushman was the son of Ara Cushman, owner of the Ara Cushman Company, one of the largest manufacturers of shoes in New England. At the time this house was built in 1889, Charles Cushman was vice president of the company and supervised three factories with 118,000 square feet (11,000 m^{2}) of space, with more than 1,000 workers. George M. Coombs was at the time a prolific and leading architect of the Auburn-Lewiston area, best known for his many industrial and civic buildings. He executed a significant number of commissions in the Auburn-Lewiston area, with this one receiving particular notice in the American Architect and Building News after its completion.

== See also ==
- National Register of Historic Places listings in Androscoggin County, Maine
