= Bradford Peck House =

Historic house in Maine, United States

- U.S. National Register of Historic Places
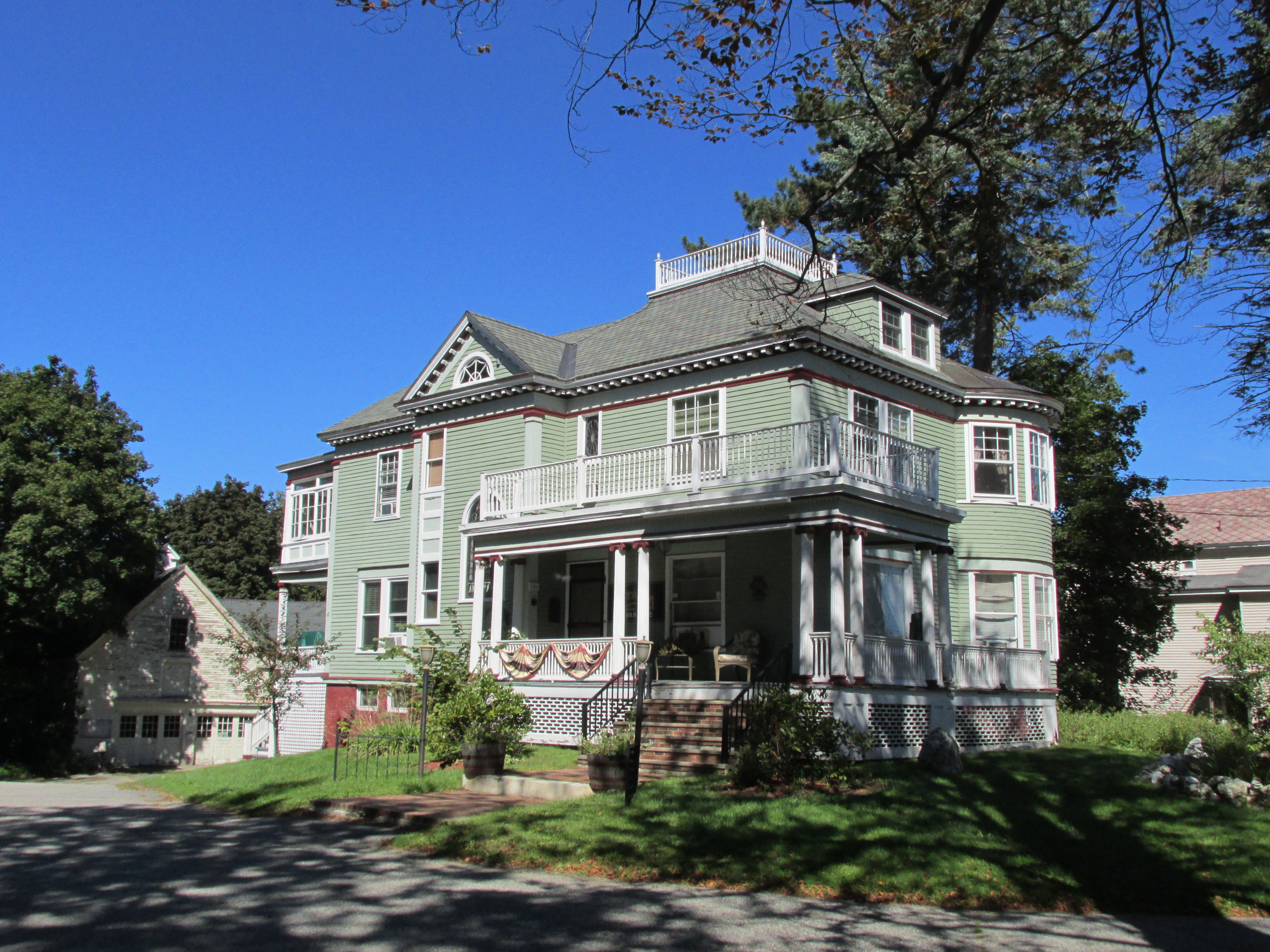
- Bradford Peck House

- Location within Maine Location within the United States
- Location: 506 Main St., Lewiston, Maine
- Coordinates: 44°6′34″N 70°12′36″W
- Area: Less than one acre
- Built: 1893
- Architect: George M. Coombs
- Architectural style: Colonial Revival, Queen Anne
- NRHP reference No.: 09000010
- Added to NRHP: February 12, 2009

The Bradford Peck House is a historic house at 506 Main Street in Lewiston, Maine. Built in 1893, it is an unusual example of a rambling and asymmetrical Colonial Revival house. It was designed by local architect George M. Coombs and built for Bradford Peck, owner of Peck's Department Store, one of the largest such stores in New England. The building was added to the National Register of Historic Places in 2009. It now houses professional offices.

== Description and history ==
The Bradford Peck House stands on the west side of Main Street, roughly 1 mile (1.6 km) north of downtown Lewiston, an area that was historically a fashionable residential area. It is a 2 1/2-story clapboarded wood-frame structure, with a hip roof topped by a flat balustraded widow's walk. Its asymmetrical massing and projecting elements are reminiscent of the Queen Anne style, but the details are essentially Colonial Revival in character. The roof line has a modillioned eave, and the building corners are pilastered. A rounded section projects from the northeast corner, and a porch extends along the south side, supported by fluted Ionic columns.

The house was designed by local architect George M. Coombs, and was built in 1893 for Bradford Peck. Peck was a Massachusetts native who moved to Lewiston in 1883, purchased a dry goods business in 1885, and renamed it B. Peck & Co. in 1890. In addition to having Coombs design his house, Peck also commissioned Coombs to design his department store building, a four-story Romanesque building at the corner of Lisbon and Main Streets. Peck's was said to be the largest department store outside Boston, with forty departments displaying all manner of merchandise. Peck's house remained in residential use until 1985, and now houses professional offices.

== See also ==
- National Register of Historic Places listings in Androscoggin County, Maine
