= Engine House (Auburn, Maine) =

- U.S. National Register of Historic Places
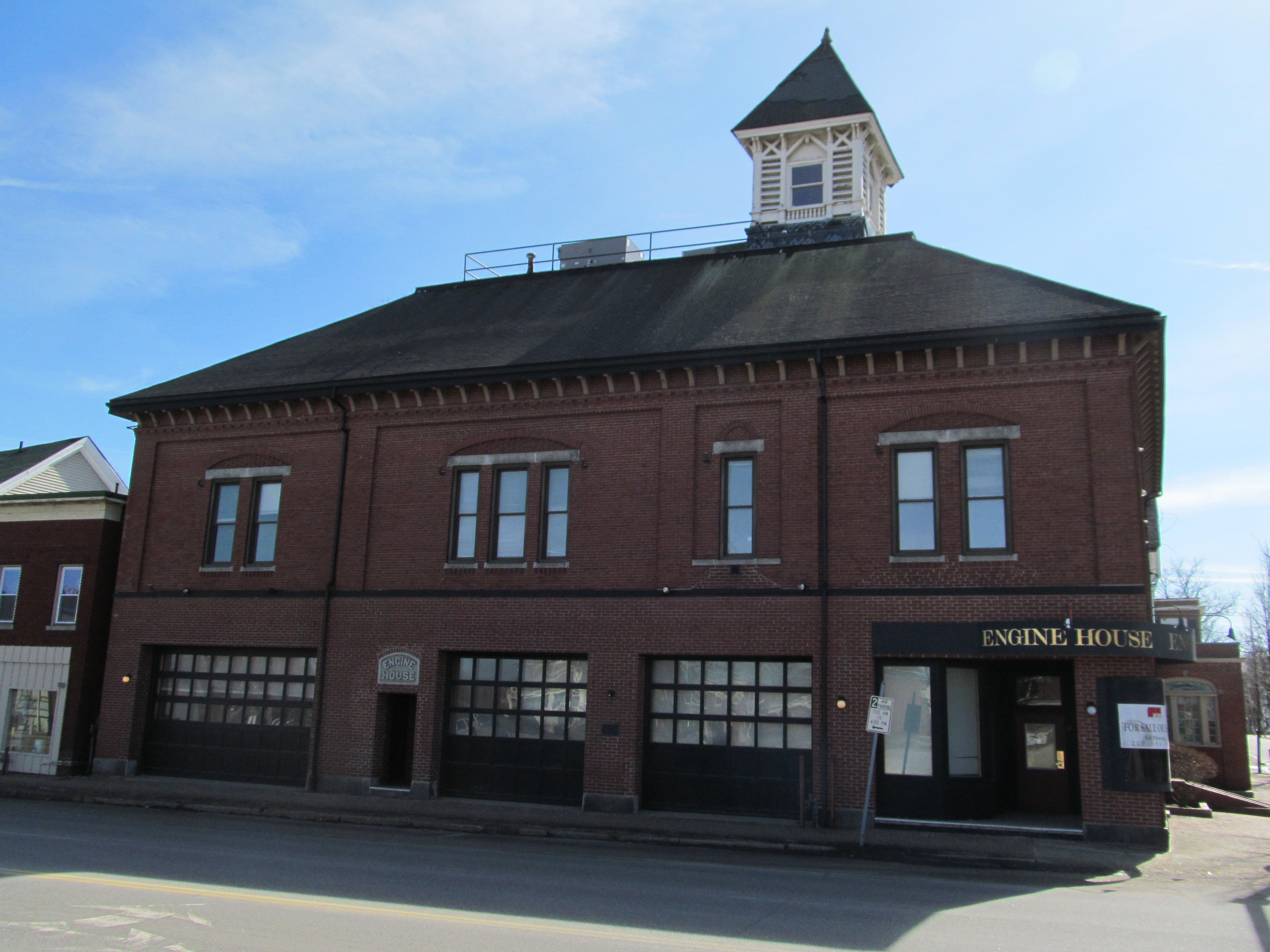
- Engine House

- Location within Maine Location within the United States
- Location: Auburn, Maine
- Coordinates: 44°5′50″N 70°13′40″W
- Built: 1879
- Architect: Stevens & Coombs
- NRHP reference No.: 78000156
- Added to NRHP: May 22, 1978

The Engine House is an historic former fire station at Court and Spring Streets in downtown Auburn, Maine, USA. Built in 1879, it is one of the few surviving 19th-century fire stations in the state of Maine. It was listed on the National Register of Historic Places in 1978.

== Description and history ==
The former Auburn Engine House is located at the southeast corner of Spring and Court Streets, overlooking the city's central business district. It is a two-story rectangular brick structure, with a truncated hip roof and a granite foundation. A square wood-frame belfry rises from the western end of the flat section at the center of the roof. The north-facing front had four engine bays, the rightmost of which has been converted to a retail entrance; the other three retain their garage bay doors. Between the first and second bays from the left is a pedestrian entrance topped by a panel identifying the building. The second floor is relatively unmodified, with groups of windows (2-3-1-2) set under segmented brick arch panels, with granite sills and lintels. The cornice is lined with wooden brackets.

The first station in this area was a private company established in 1849, when it was known as Lewiston Falls and was still part of adjacent Lewiston. In 1859 the Auburn Village Corporation, which operated the fire protection service, purchased this lot and built a wood-frame fire house on it. This corporation was acquired by the city of Auburn in 1867. A new fire house was built on the site in 1870 to accommodate new equipment; it was destroyed by fire (probably started in its stables) in 1878. This fire house was completed the following year. It remained in active service until 1971, and has now been adapted for use as a commercial/retail space.

== See also ==
- National Register of Historic Places listings in Androscoggin County, Maine
