= Second Callahan Block =

- U.S. National Register of Historic Places
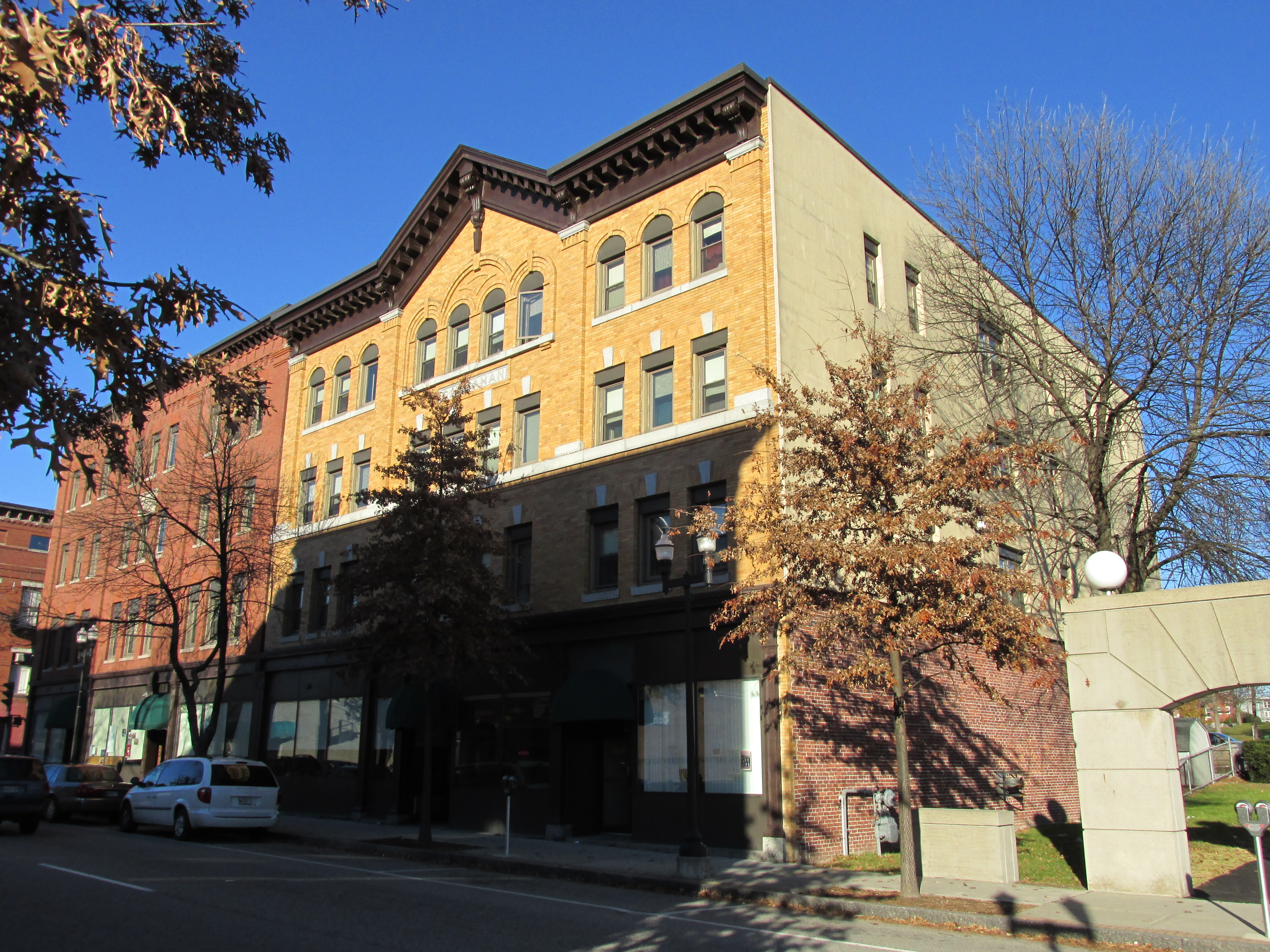
- Second Callahan Block

- Location within Maine Location within the United States
- Location: 282 Lisbon St., Lewiston, Maine
- Coordinates: 44°5′38″N 70°12′58″W
- Built: 1910
- Architect: Coombs & Gibbs
- Architectural style: Renaissance
- MPS: Lewiston Commercial District MRA
- NRHP reference No.: 86002290
- Added to NRHP: April 25, 1986

The Second Callahan Block is an historic commercial building at 282 Lisbon Street in downtown Lewiston, Maine. Built in 1909 to a design by Coombs & Gibbs, it was part of a major development by brothers Timothy and Eugene Callahan. It was added to the National Register of Historic Places in 1986. Although initially developed as a commercial property, it is presently used as housing.

== Description and history ==
The Second Callahan Block is located on the east side of Lisbon Street, between Chestnut and Spruce Streets. It is just south of the First Callahan Building, which stands at the corner of Chestnut Street. It is a four-story masonry structure, with a facade of yellow brick topped by a gabled cornice with projecting bracketed pediment. The ground floor originally had two storefronts flanking the building entrance, with fluted pilasters articulating the sections. The upper floors have ten window bays, organized in a 3-4-3 pattern. Windows are set in keystoned square openings on the second and third floors, and in rounded-arch openings on the fourth. A stone beltcourse separates the second and third floors, also acting as a sill for the windows. Brick pilasters separate and flank the grouped sections on the upper two floors. The scale, materials, and style of the building is considered to be consistent with other commercial buildings on Lisbon Street.

The building was commissioned by Timothy F. and Eugene A. Callahan, dealers in men's accessories. Prior to the construction of this building, the Callahan brothers had built the neighboring building in 1892. The 1892 building was designed by George M. Coombs, and the new building was designed by his office, Coombs & Gibbs, now led by his son Harry S. Coombs.

== See also ==
- National Register of Historic Places listings in Androscoggin County, Maine
