= Cole Block (Bethel, Maine) =

- U.S. National Register of Historic Places
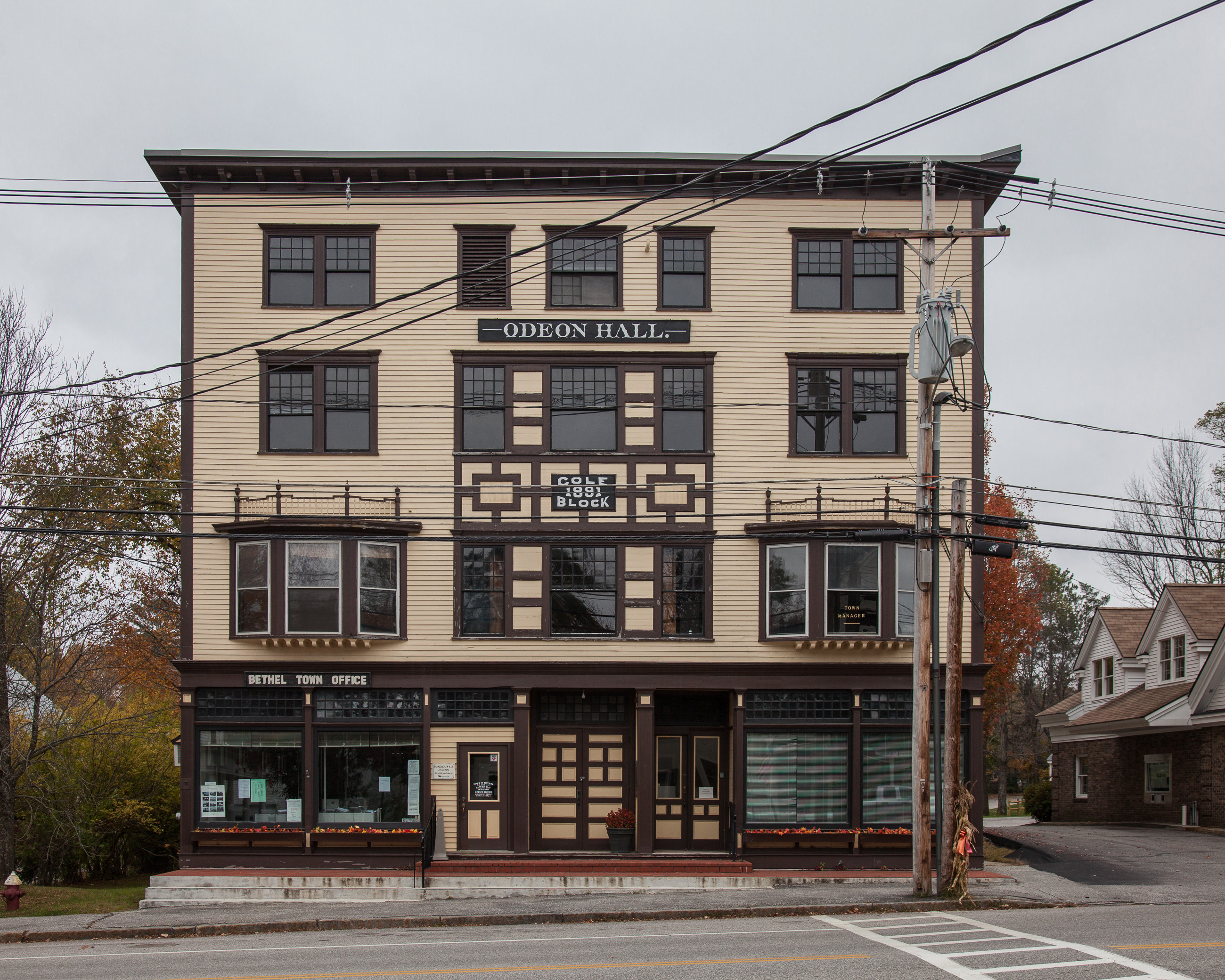
- Cole Block in 2013

- Location within Maine Location within the United States
- Location: 19 Main St., Bethel, Maine
- Coordinates: 44°24′26″N 70°47′33″W
- Area: less than one acre
- Built: 1891
- Architect: George M. Coombs
- Architectural style: Queen Anne
- NRHP reference No.: 98000310
- Added to NRHP: April 1, 1998

The Cole Block is a historic commercial building at 19 Main Street in Bethel, Maine. Built in 1891, the four story frame structure is the most prominent commercial building in the town. It was listed on the National Register of Historic Places in 1998.

== Description and history ==
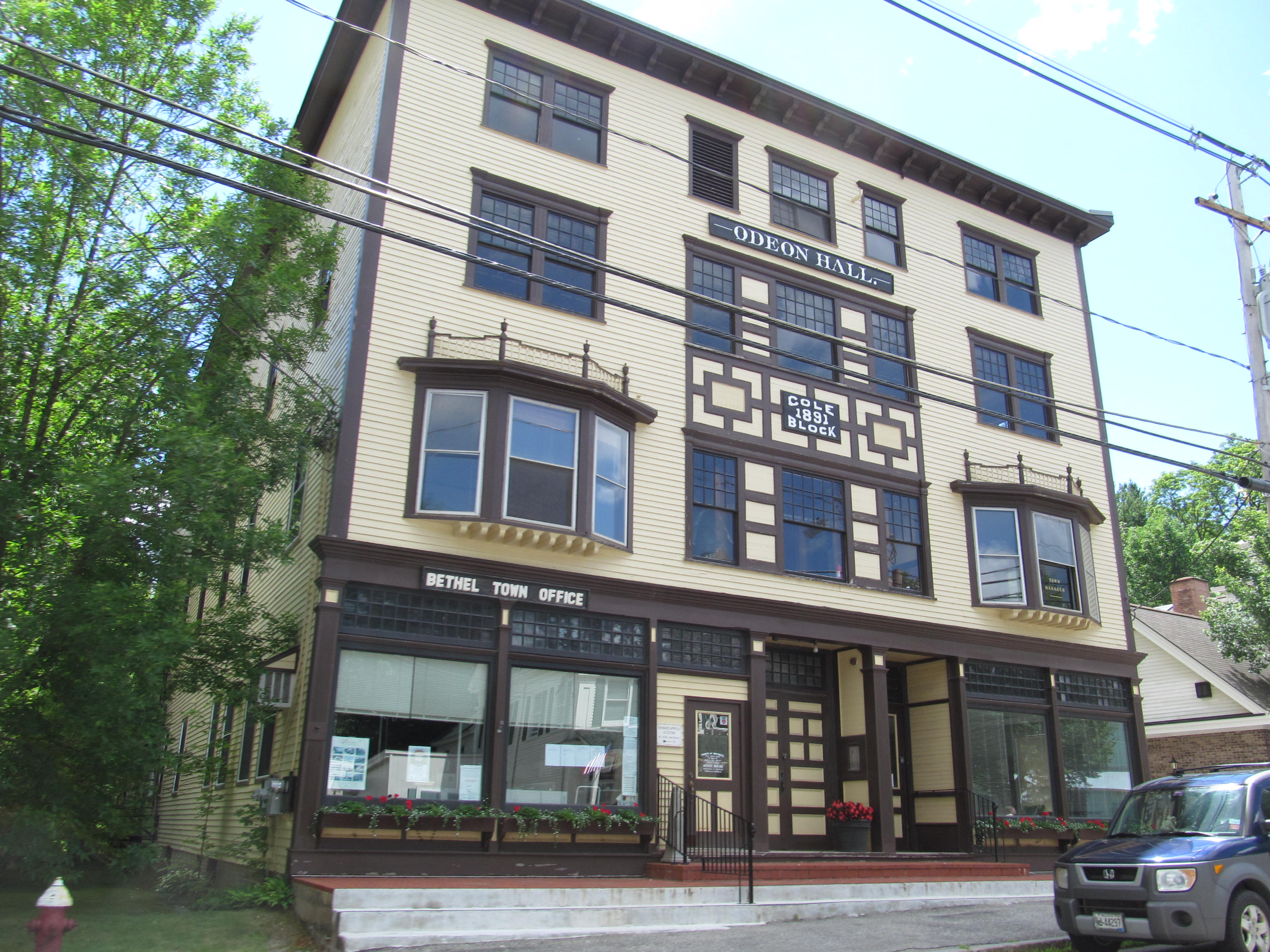

The Cole Block is a four-story wood-frame structure, with two storefronts at the ground level, two office spaces on the second level, and a large auditorium space occupying the rest of the building. The main (northwest-facing) facade is almost symmetrically arranged, with the storefronts opening into a recessed area in the center which also houses the door leading to the upper level. The left-side entry has been altered to be flush with the facade; that storefront now houses the town offices. The upper levels are entirely symmetrical, with applied woodwork between the windows in the central section. A panel centered between the second and third floor identifies the building: "Cole Block 1891", while a second panel between the third and fourth is labelled "Odeon Hall". (That panel is no longer present, although the shadow of the sign is visible).

The block was designed by George M. Coombs, and built in 1891 for Fred and Elmer Cole, and is the most prominent building in Bethel's small downtown area. The construction was apparently a financial stretch for the brothers, who soon lost the property to foreclosure. The foreclosing bank, the Bethel Savings Bank, occupied most of the first floor, through the southern storefront, until 1974, while a variety of commercial tenants occupied the other side. The Odeon Hall on the upper floors was a major social venue in the town, housing all manner of private and public functions, including graduation ceremonies for Gould Academy.

== See also ==
- National Register of Historic Places listings in Oxford County, Maine
