= Lewiston Trust and Safe Deposit Company =

- U.S. National Register of Historic Places
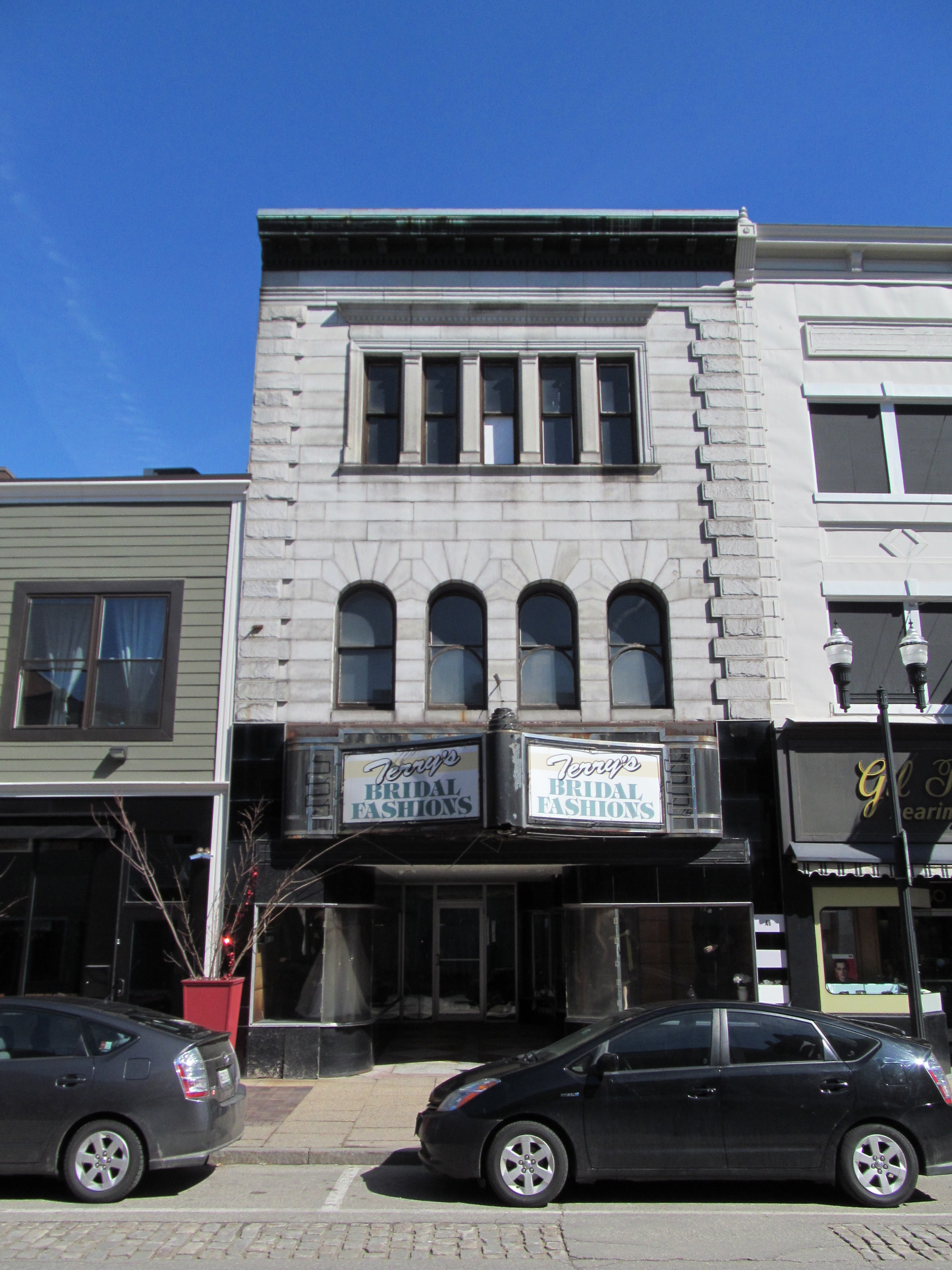
- Lewiston Trust and Safe Deposit Company

- Location within Maine Location within the United States
- Location: 46 Lisbon St., Lewiston, Maine
- Coordinates: 44°5′52″N 70°13′5″W
- Built: 1898
- Architect: Coombs, Gibbs & Wilkinson
- Architectural style: Classical Revival
- MPS: Lewiston Commercial District MRA
- NRHP reference No.: 86002283
- Added to NRHP: April 25, 1986

The Lewiston Trust and Safe Deposit Company is a historic commercial building at 46 Lisbon Street in Lewiston, Maine. Built in 1898, it is one of the least-altered designs of the important local architectural firm Coombs, Gibbs & Wilkinson. Its only significant alterations were in 1926 and the 1940s, when it served as a retail space occupied by Grant's Clothing for many years. The building was listed on the National Register of Historic Places in 1986. It continues to house retail and other commercial tenants.

== Description and history ==
The Lewiston Trust and Safe Deposit Company building is located on the east side of Lisbon Street, Lewiston's principal downtown commercial street, between Main and Ash Streets. It is a three-story masonry structure, with party walls directly abutting the neighboring buildings. Its facade is ashlar granite, with quoined corners and a metal cornice. Its ground floor retail space has a Moderne style recessed entrance with flanking display areas set with black panels above and below, and is topped by a projecting triangular-fronted marquee. The second floor has four sash windows set in round-arch openings. The third floor has a grouping of five narrower windows, with pilasters separating the windows of the group and an entablature above.

The Lewiston Trust Company commissioned the construction of this building in 1898, and occupied it until 1921, when it moved to larger quarters across the street. The building was purchased in 1926 by W. Grant, owner of a clothing store. He made alterations to the interior to accommodate the retail function, but retained significant architectural elements, including marble flooring and stairs, basement level waiting rooms, and the bank president's office on the second floor, which has rich decorative woodwork.

The building design was the work of Harry Wilkinson, then in partnership with George Coombs and Eugene Gibbs and, compared with other buildings by these designers, has been described as one of the least-altered and best-preserved.

== See also ==
- National Register of Historic Places listings in Androscoggin County, Maine
