= First National Bank (Lewiston, Maine) =

- U.S. National Register of Historic Places
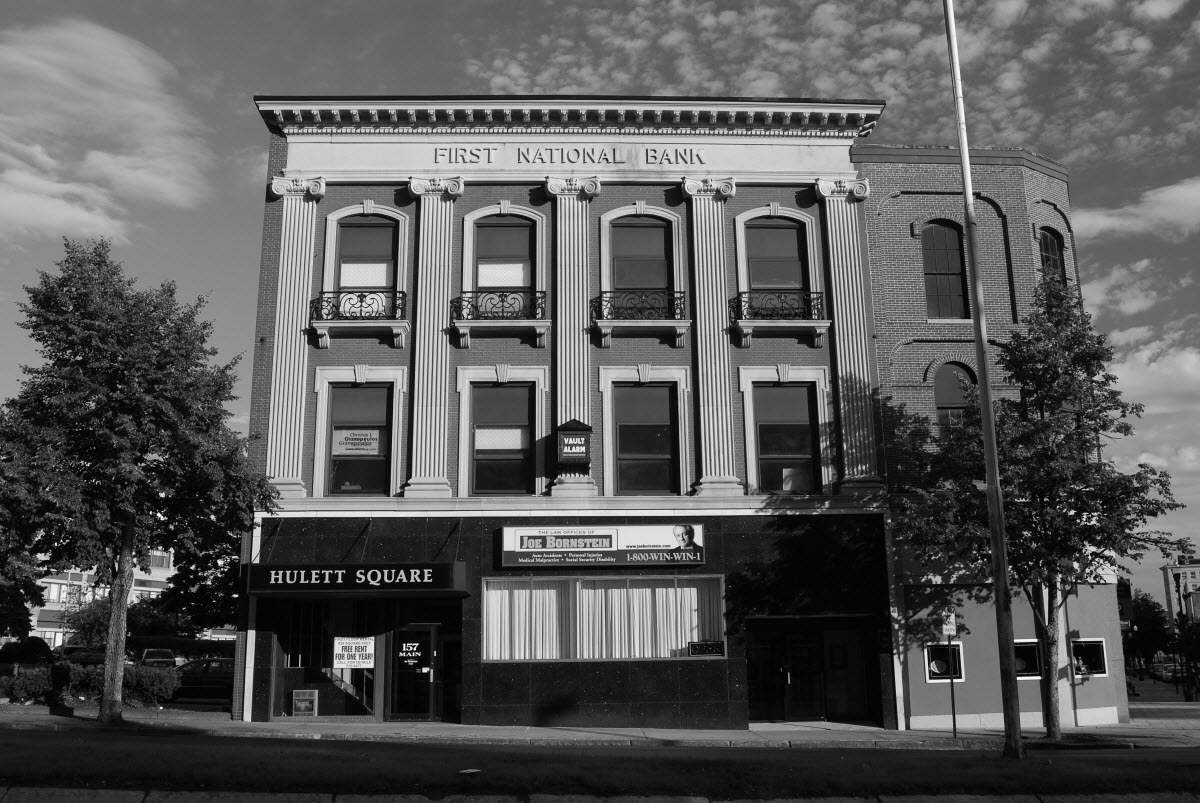

- Location within Maine Location within the United States
- Location: 157-163 Main Street, Lewiston, Maine
- Coordinates: 44°5′55″N 70°13′6″W
- Built: 1903
- Architectural style: Classical Revival
- MPS: Lewiston Commercial District MRA
- NRHP reference No.: 86002282
- Added to NRHP: April 25, 1986

The First National Bank is a historic commercial building in Lewiston, Maine. Built about 1903 for the city's first chartered bank, it is a fine local example of French-inspired Classical Revival architecture. The building was listed on the National Register of Historic Places in 1986.

== Description and history ==
The First National Bank building is located on the south side of Main Street (United States Route 202) in downtown Lewiston, marking the end of a block of brick and masonry buildings at the junction of Main and Lisbon Streets. It is a three-story building with brick walls and cast stone trim. The main facade is four bays wide, with a first floor of modernized storefronts. The bays of the upper floors are demarcated by fluted Doric pilasters, with th esecond-floor windows having square hooded trim, and the third floor windows having segmented-arch lintels. The pilasters support an entablature, above which a modillioned and dentillated cornice projects. The third floor windows have wrought iron balconies supported by cast stone brackets.

The Lewiston Falls Bank, later the First National Bank, was founded in 1852, and was instrumental in financing the growth of Lewiston's textile mills in the period before the American Civil War. This building, whose architect is unknown, was built for the institution about 1903. When it was listed on the National Register of Historic Places in 1986, it was occupied by the bank's successor, Norstar Bank. The building presently houses other retail and commercial businesses.

== See also ==
- National Register of Historic Places listings in Androscoggin County, Maine
