= Philo Reed House =

Historic house in Maine, United States

- U.S. National Register of Historic Places
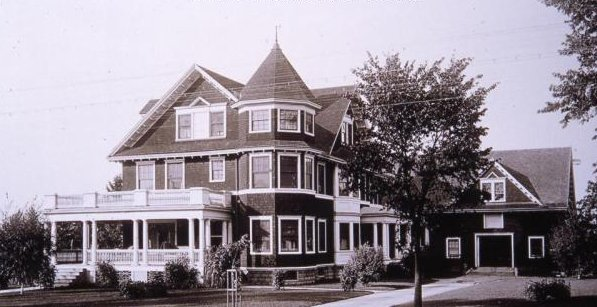
- Photograph c. 1910

- Location within Maine Location within the United States
- Location: 38 Main Street, Fort Fairfield, Maine
- Coordinates: 46°46′03″N 67°49′12″W
- Built: 1907
- Architectural style: Queen Anne
- NRHP reference No.: 86000673
- Added to NRHP: April 4, 1986

The Philo Reed House is an historic house at 38 Main Street in Fort Fairfield, Maine. Built in 1907 to a design by Coombs and Gibbs, it is one of the town's grandest houses, a transitional combination of Queen Anne and Colonial Revival styling. It was built for Philo Reed founder of one of the nation's largest seed potato companies of the time. It was listed on the National Register of Historic Places in April 1986.

== Description and history ==
The Reed House is set on the north side of Main Street (Maine State Route 161), near the eastern edge of Fort Fairfield's village center. It is a 2 1/2-story wood-frame structure, with asymmetrical massing characteristic of the Queen Anne style. Its prominent features include a three-story turret at the right front corner, a cross-gable roof with dormers and extended modillioned gable eaves, and a porch, supported by Colonial Revival Tuscan columns, that wraps around the front and left side. The interior of the house has high-quality Colonial Revival woodwork, including the stairway newel post and balustrade, and fireplace mantelpieces. Original doors include sections of patterned beveled glass.

The house was designed by the Lewiston firm of Coombs and Gibbs, who were responsible for a number of commercial and civic buildings in Fort Fairfield. The house was built for Philo Reed, who came to Aroostook County in 1885 and established a highly successful business in the development and sale of seed potatoes. His descendants, who continue to run the business, include John H. Reed, a Governor of Maine.

== See also ==
- National Register of Historic Places listings in Aroostook County, Maine
