= Dr. Louis J. Martel House =

Historic house in Maine, United States

- U.S. National Register of Historic Places
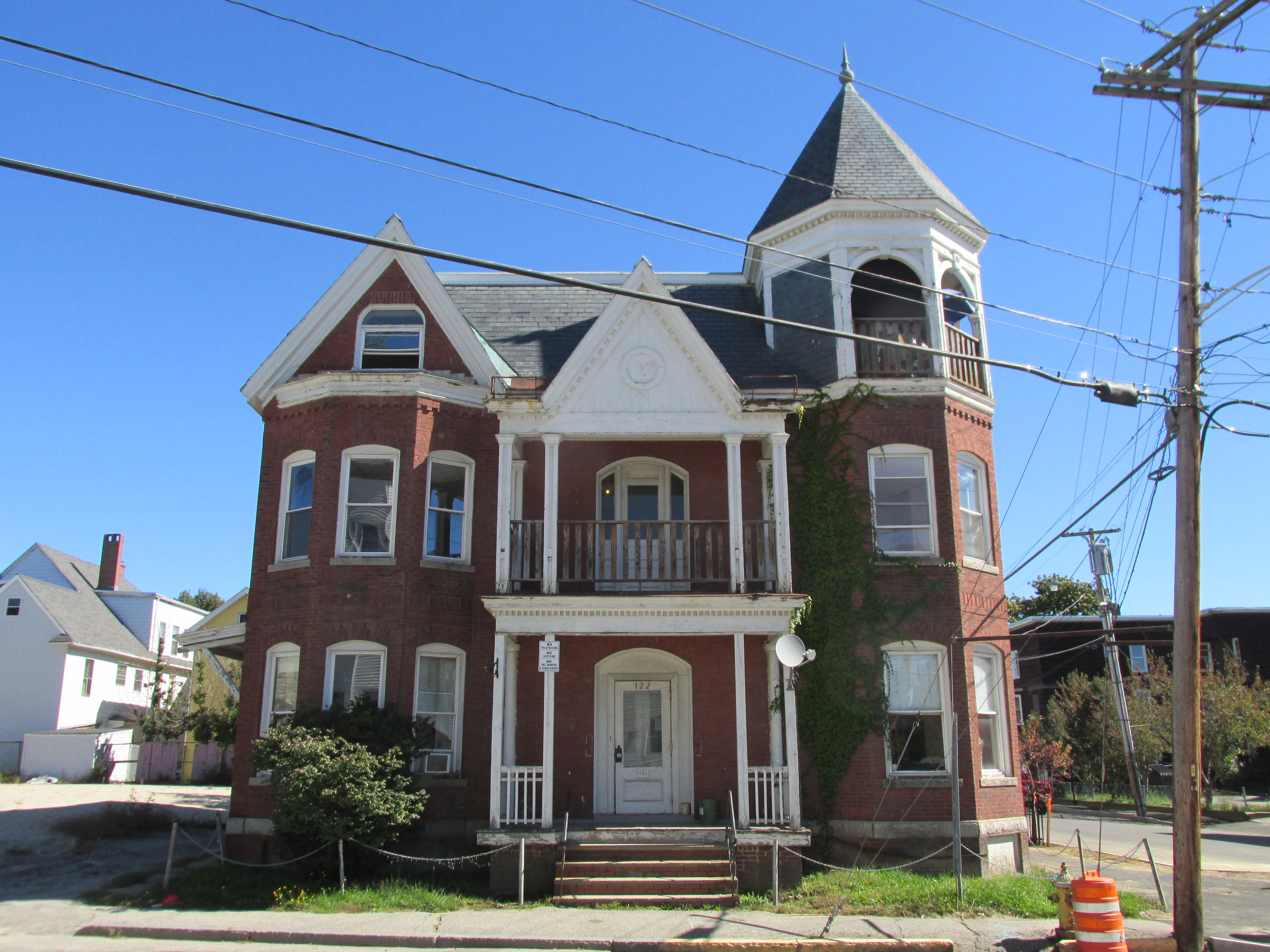
- Dr. Louis J. Martel House

- Location within Maine Location within the United States
- Location: Lewiston, Maine
- Coordinates: 44°5′46″N 70°12′39″W
- Built: 1883
- Architect: Stevens and Coombs
- Architectural style: Queen Anne
- NRHP reference No.: 83000445
- Added to NRHP: January 4, 1983

The Dr. Louis J. Martel House is a historic house at 122–124 Bartlett Street in Lewiston, Maine. Built in 1883, it is a fine example of Queen Anne Victorian architecture executed in brick, and is historically notable as the home of Louis Martel, Maine's first Franco-American politician to achieve statewide prominence, and a major benefactor of the Lewiston community. The house was listed on the National Register of Historic Places in 1983.

== Description and history ==
The Martel House is set east of downtown Lewiston, at the northeast corner of Bartlett and Walnut Streets. The neighborhood it is in is now, as it was when built, predominantly multiunit working-class housing. It is a 2 1/2-story brick building, with a hip roof broken by gabled projections and a three-story corner turret, which is capped by an octagonal roof and finial. At the center of the front facade is a two-story porch, supported by slender paneled columns, and topped by a gable with a dentillated cornice. To the left of the porch is a projecting polygonal bay, which is matched on the right by the form of the projecting turret section. The third floor of the turret is partly taken up by a small porch.

The house was built in 1883, and was probably the only brick house built in Lewiston's 19th-century French quarters. Dr. Louis J. Martel, for whom it was built, was a nationally known leader of the Franco-American community, publishing a French-language newspaper, serving in the state legislature and the local board of aldermen, and narrowly losing election as mayor in 1893. He was instrumental in establishing what is now Saint Mary's Regional Medical Center, and in organizing the Roman Catholic parish of Saints Peter and Paul.

== See also ==
- National Register of Historic Places listings in Androscoggin County, Maine
