= William H. Stevens =

American architect

William Henry Stevens
- Born: March 22, 1818; West Gardiner, Maine
- Died: August 20, 1880 (aged 62); Lewiston, Maine
- Occupation: Architect
- Practice: William H. Stevens, Fassett & Stevens, Stevens & Coombs
- Buildings: Worumbo Mill, Roak Block, W. P. Frye House

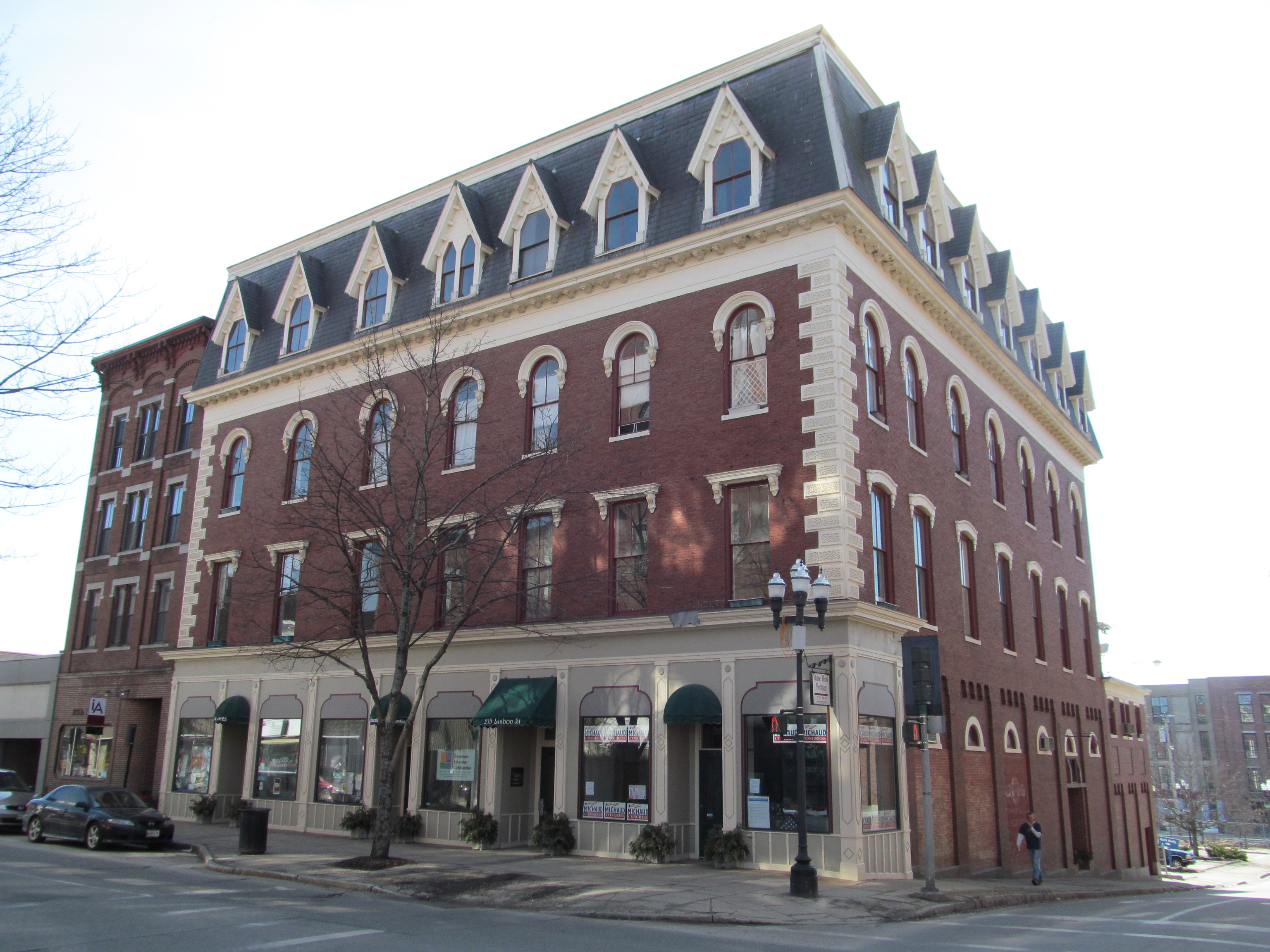
Savings Bank Block, Lewiston, 1868.

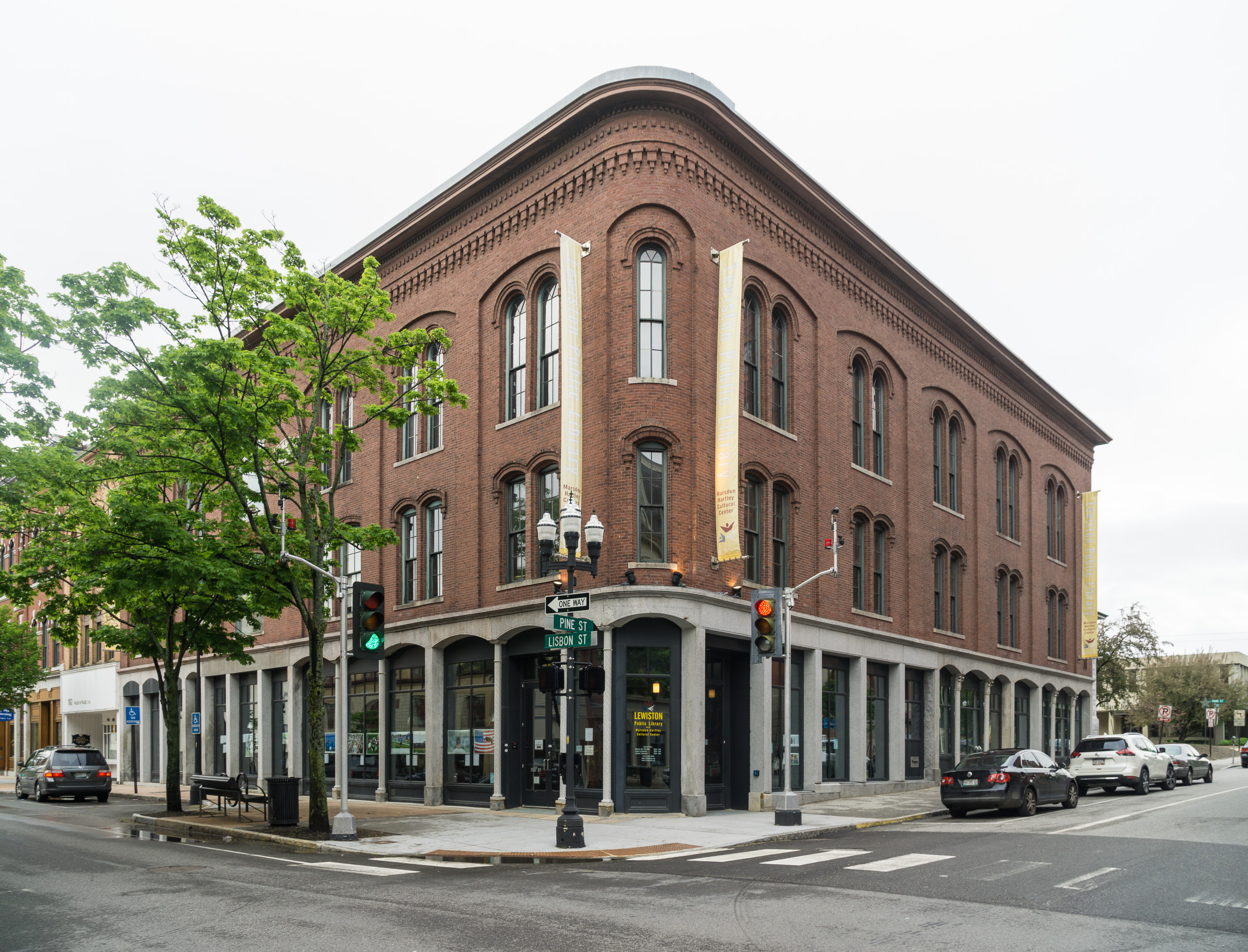
Pilsbury Block, Lewiston, 1870 and 1873.

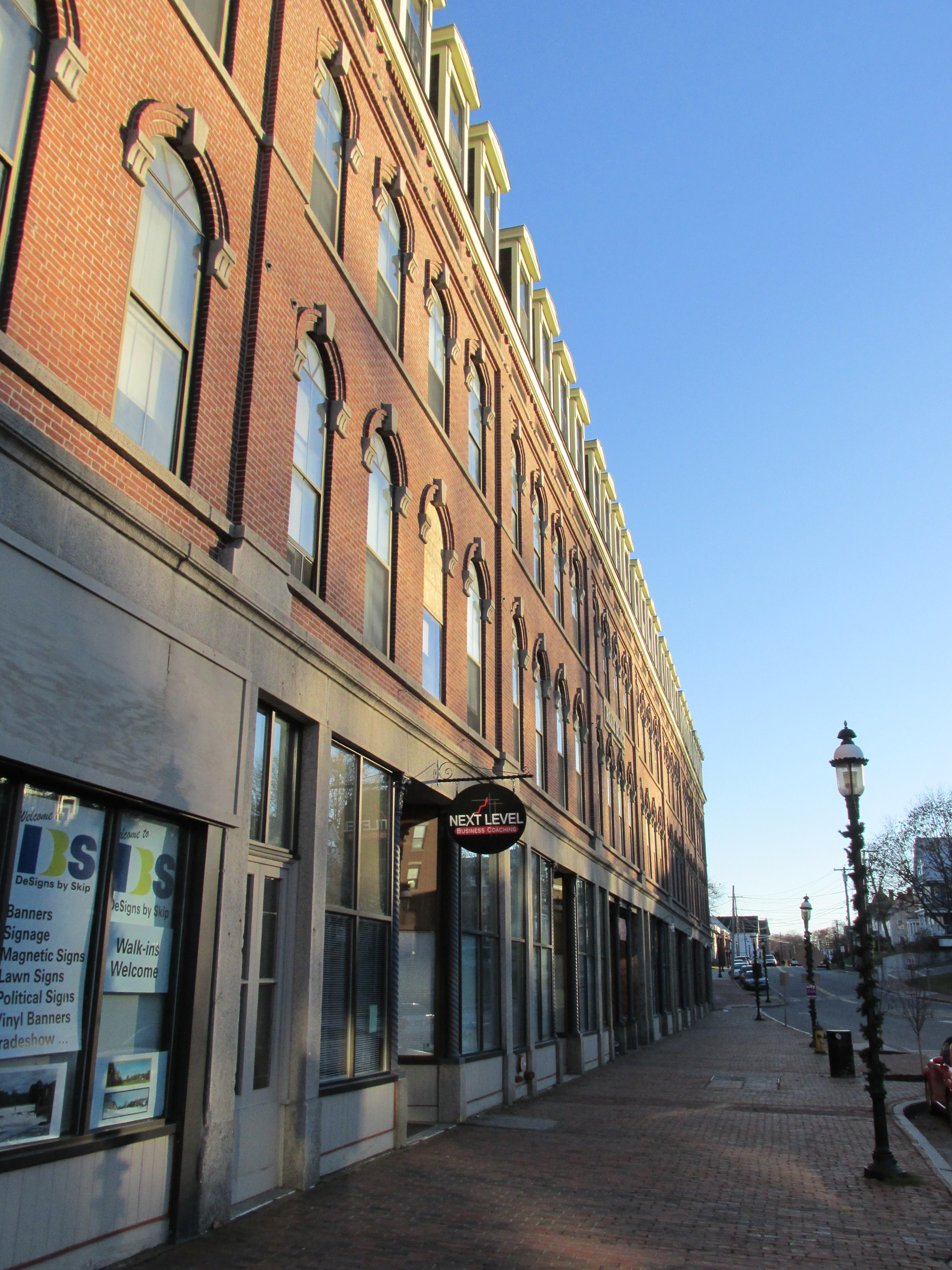
Roak Block, Auburn, 1871.

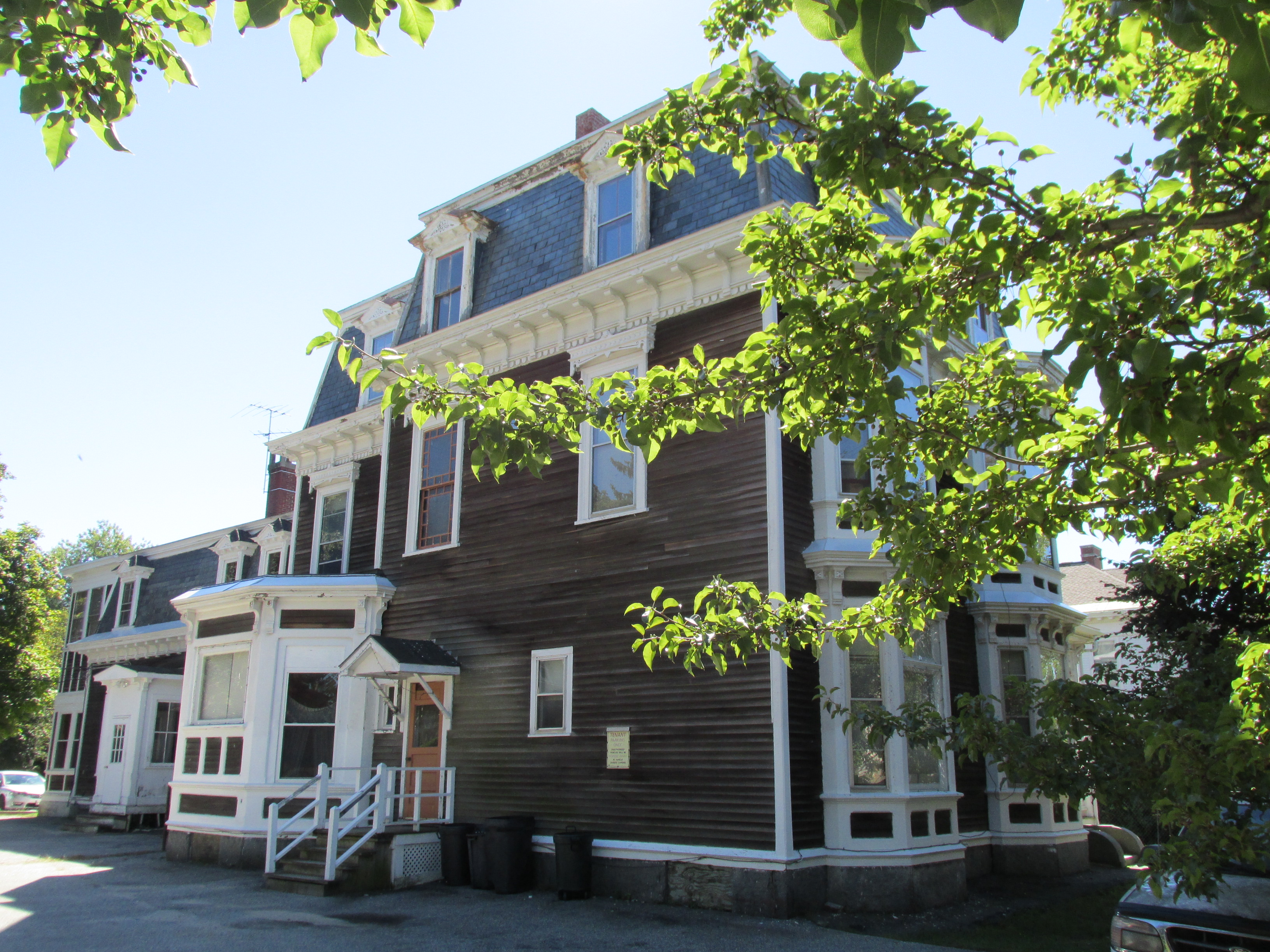
William P. Frye House, Lewiston, 1873.

William H. Stevens (1818–1880) was an American architect from Lewiston, Maine.

== Life ==
Stevens was born in West Gardiner, Maine in 1818. He learned the carpenter's trade, and moved to Lewiston in 1849, acquiring land on the outskirts of town. in 1851 he and five others went to California, to try their hand at prospecting. He returned to Lewiston in 1855, continuing to work as a carpenter. In 1864 he took a position with the Franklin Company, and became the in-house architect and engineer, a position he retained until 1870. That year, he opened an independent office as an architect.

Stevens worked alone until 1873, when he formed a partnership with Edward F. Fassett, son of Francis. The firm, Fassett & Stevens, was dissolved in 1874, in the wake of the Panic of 1873. Stevens resumed his independent practice, and Fassett returned to his father in Portland. After a brief period, Stevens and George M. Coombs formed a new partnership, Stevens & Coombs. They remained together until Stevens' death in August 1880, after a period of illness.

Stevens served on the Lewiston city council, and was elected mayor in 1870.

== Architectural works ==
William H. Stevens, 1864-1873:

- 1864 - Worumbo Mill, Canal St, Lisbon Falls, Maine
  - Burned in 1987
- 1867 - Lincoln Boarding House, 100 Main St, Lewiston, Maine
  - Demolished in 1964
- 1868 - Bates Street School, 255 Bates St, Lewiston, Maine
  - Has lost its Mansard roof
- 1868 - Savings Bank Block, 215 Lisbon St, Lewiston, Maine
- 1870 - Bonnallie Block, 249 Main St, Lewiston, Maine
- 1870 - Pilsbury Block, 200-210 Lisbon St, Lewiston, Maine
- 1871 - Roak Block, 156 Main St, Auburn, Maine
- 1872 - Farwell Mill, 244 Lisbon St, Lisbon, Maine

Fassett & Stevens, 1873-1874:

- 1873 - William P. Frye House, 457 Main St, Lewiston, Maine
- 1873 - Pilsbury Block (Addition), 200-210 Lisbon St, Lewiston, Maine
- 1874 - Webster Grammar School, 45 Spring St, Auburn, Maine
  - Demolished

William H. Stevens, 1874-1875:

- 1874 - Goodwin R. Wiley House, 39 Church St, Bethel, Maine
  - Demolished

Stevens & Coombs, 1875-1880:

- 1876 - William Bradford House, 54 Pine St, Lewiston, Maine
  - Demolished in 2007
- 1876 - Farwell Bleachery, 39 S Canal St, Lawrence, Massachusetts
  - Burned in 1994
- 1876 - Odd Fellows Block, 182–190 Lisbon St, Lewiston, Maine
- 1877 - Edward Little High School, 30 Academy St, Auburn, Maine
  - Demolished
- 1878 - Charles Gay House, 64 Highland Ave, Auburn, Maine
- 1878 - Lewiston Water Works, 38 Island Ave, Lewiston, Maine
  - Only the gatehouse remains
- 1879 - Auburn Engine House, 158 Court St, Auburn, Maine
- 1879 - Squirrell Island Chapel, S Shore Ave, Squirrel Island, Maine

== See also ==
- List of mayors of Lewiston, Maine
