= Roak Block =

- U.S. National Register of Historic Places
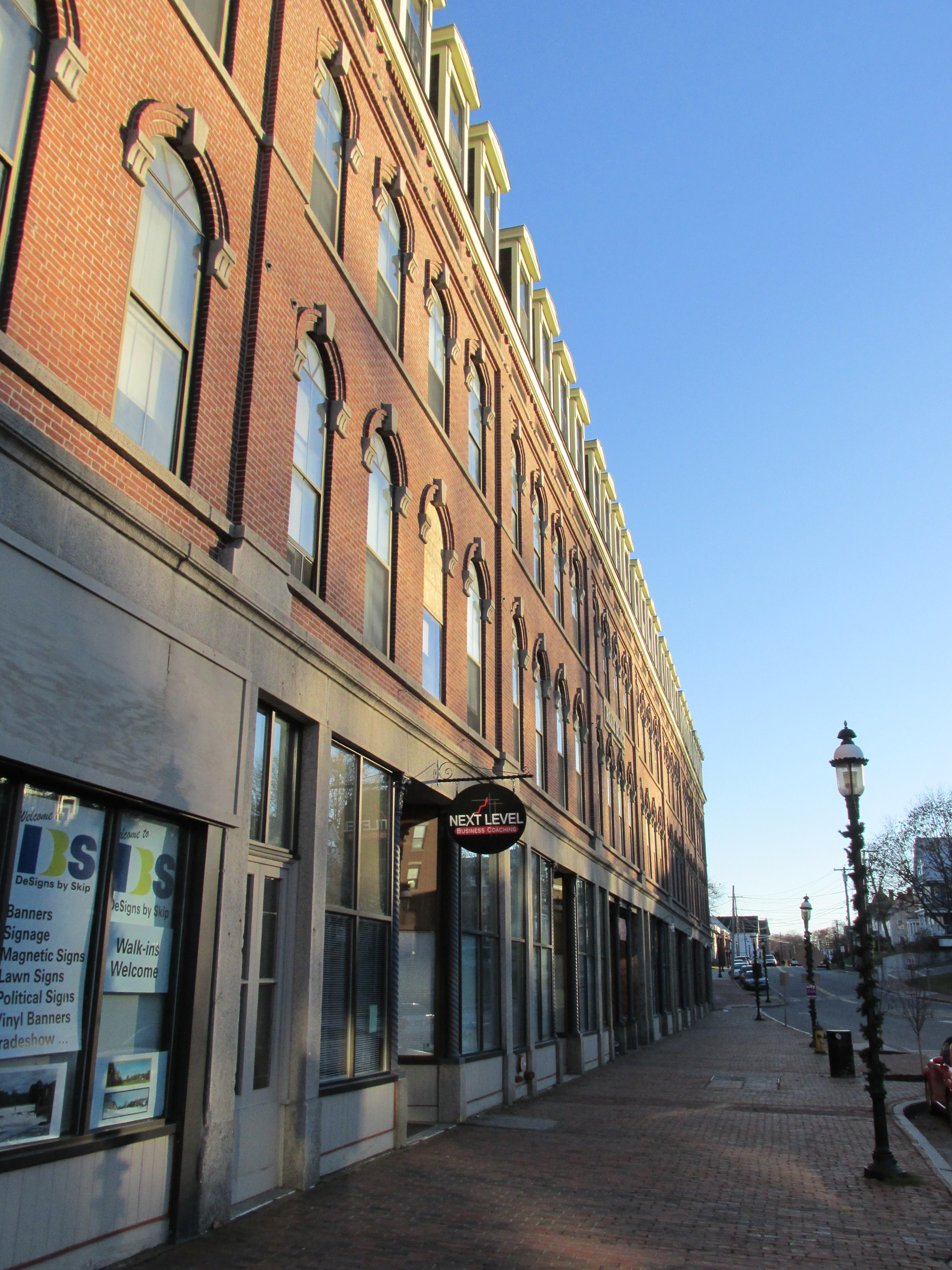
- Roak Block

- Location within Maine Location within the United States
- Location: 144-170 Main St., Auburn, Maine
- Coordinates: 44°5′44″N 70°13′30″W
- Built: 1871
- Built by: Norton & Edwards
- Architect: William H. Stevens
- Architectural style: Second Empire
- NRHP reference No.: 82000738
- Added to NRHP: January 28, 1982

The Roak Block is an historic commercial-industrial building at 144-170 Main Street in Auburn, Maine. Built in 1871-72 as a combined commercial and industrial space, this Second Empire style block was at that time the largest commercial building in the entire state. It was listed on the National Register of Historic Places in 1982.

== Description and history ==
The Roak Block stands on the east side of Auburn's commercial Main Street, near its junction with Mechanics Row. It is a long 3-1/2 story masonry building, built of brick and stone, with a mansard roof, studded with dormers, providing a full fourth floor in the attic level. The building is 36 bays long, divided into nine sections of four bays. On the ground floor, each section houses a retail storefront except the center one, which provides access to the main building lobby. The storefronts typically consist of display windows flanking a recessed entry. Second floor windows are set in round-arch openings with stone keystones and shoulders, with a narrow stringcourse acting as a sill. The third floor windows have segmented-arch openings, but are otherwise similar. The dormers on the steep roof section have shallow gabled roofs, with drip moulding around the windows.

The block was built in 1871-72 to a design by the Lewiston firm of Stevens and Coombs, for Jacob Roak, a shoe manufacturer and leading businessman in the city. At the time of its construction, it was the largest building of its type erected in the state. The upper levels of the building were designed as spaces for incubating businesses related to shoe manufacturing, where small businesses could work until they were successful enough to require larger quarters. The building was used in this fashion for 90 years. Its upper floors have been converted for use as senior housing.

== See also ==
- National Register of Historic Places listings in Androscoggin County, Maine
