= Pilsbury Block =

- U.S. National Register of Historic Places
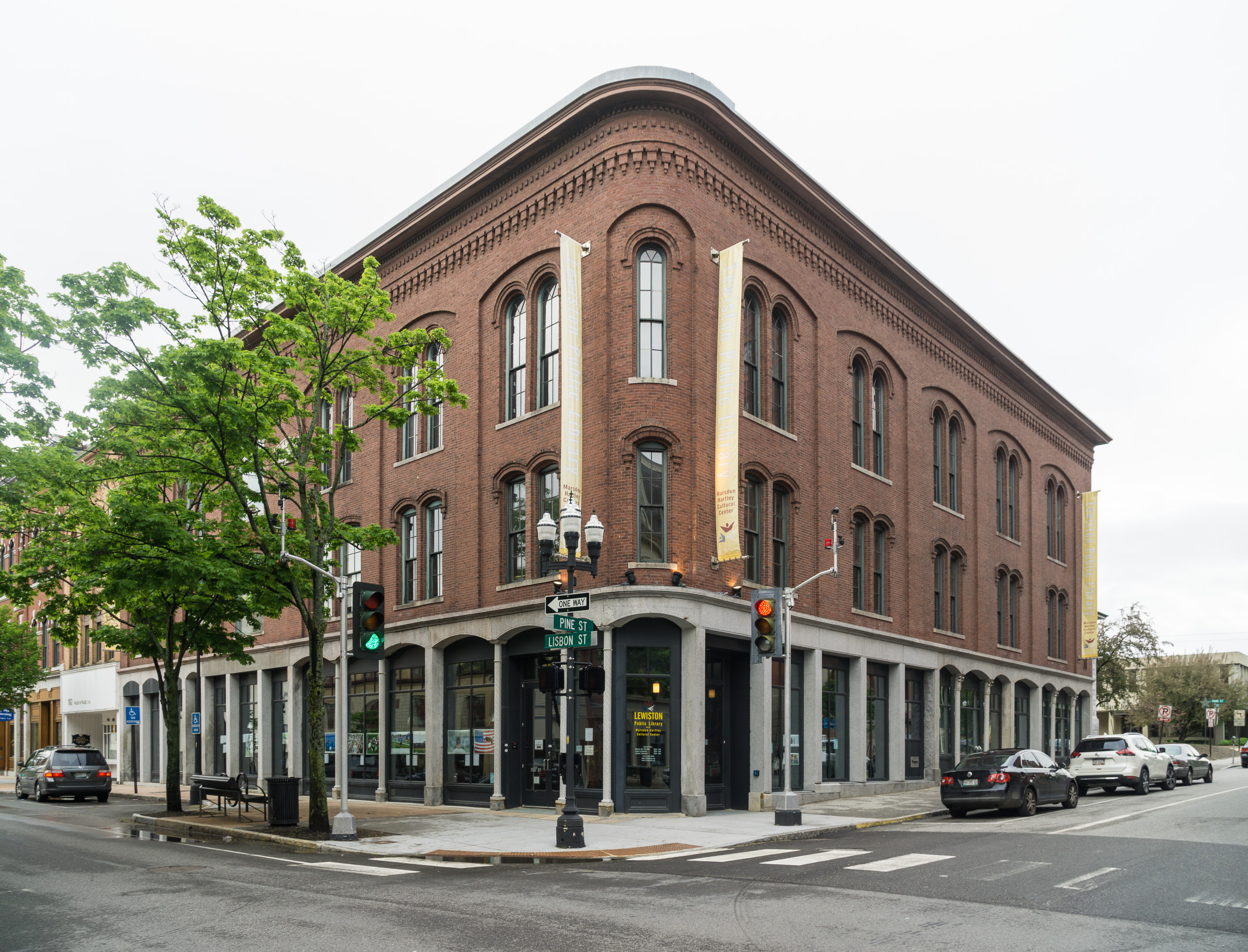
- Pilsbury Block

- Location within Maine Location within the United States
- Location: 200-210 Lisbon St., Lewiston, Maine
- Coordinates: 44°5′44″N 70°13′1″W
- Built: 1870
- Built by: Jesse T. Stevens
- Architect: William H. Stevens; Fassett & Stevens
- Architectural style: Italianate, Romanesque
- NRHP reference No.: 83000446
- Added to NRHP: April 14, 1983

The Pilsbury Block is an historic commercial building at 200-210 Lisbon Street in Lewiston, Maine. The block was built in 1870, and is a late example of Italianate architecture, exhibiting some Romanesque details. The building was added to the National Register of Historic Places in 1983.

== Description and history ==
The Pilsbury Block is located on Lisbon Street, Lewiston's principal commercial thoroughfare, at the northeast corner with Pine Street. It is a three-story masonry structure with a narrow rounded bay at the street corner. The upper floors are divided into large bays, five facing Pine Street and six facing Lisbon, each set in a recessed arched panel. There are paired windows in each panel, set in round-arch openings on the third floor and segmented-arch openings on the second. The ground floor storefronts are set in groups of segmented-arch or flat-topped segments of stone, with either display windows or entrances topped by transom windows. The building is capped by a corbelled brickwork cornice.

The oldest portion of the building, the corner section, was built in 1870 for George H. Pilsbury by Jesse T. Stevens, a local engineer. The architect may have been William H. Stevens, who was closely associated with Pilsbury in the Franklin Company and the Lewiston Institution for Savings (later the Peoples' Savings Bank). In 1873 it was enlarged by the addition of three bays on Lisbon Street. The addition is known to have been designed by Stevens, now practicing as Fassett & Stevens. The building is one of Lewiston's oldest surviving commercial buildings, and a rare example of transitional Italianate-Romanesque architecture.

The Pilsbury Block is now part of Lewiston Public Library.

== See also ==
- National Register of Historic Places listings in Androscoggin County, Maine
