= Gay-Munroe House =

Historic house in Maine, United States

- U.S. National Register of Historic Places
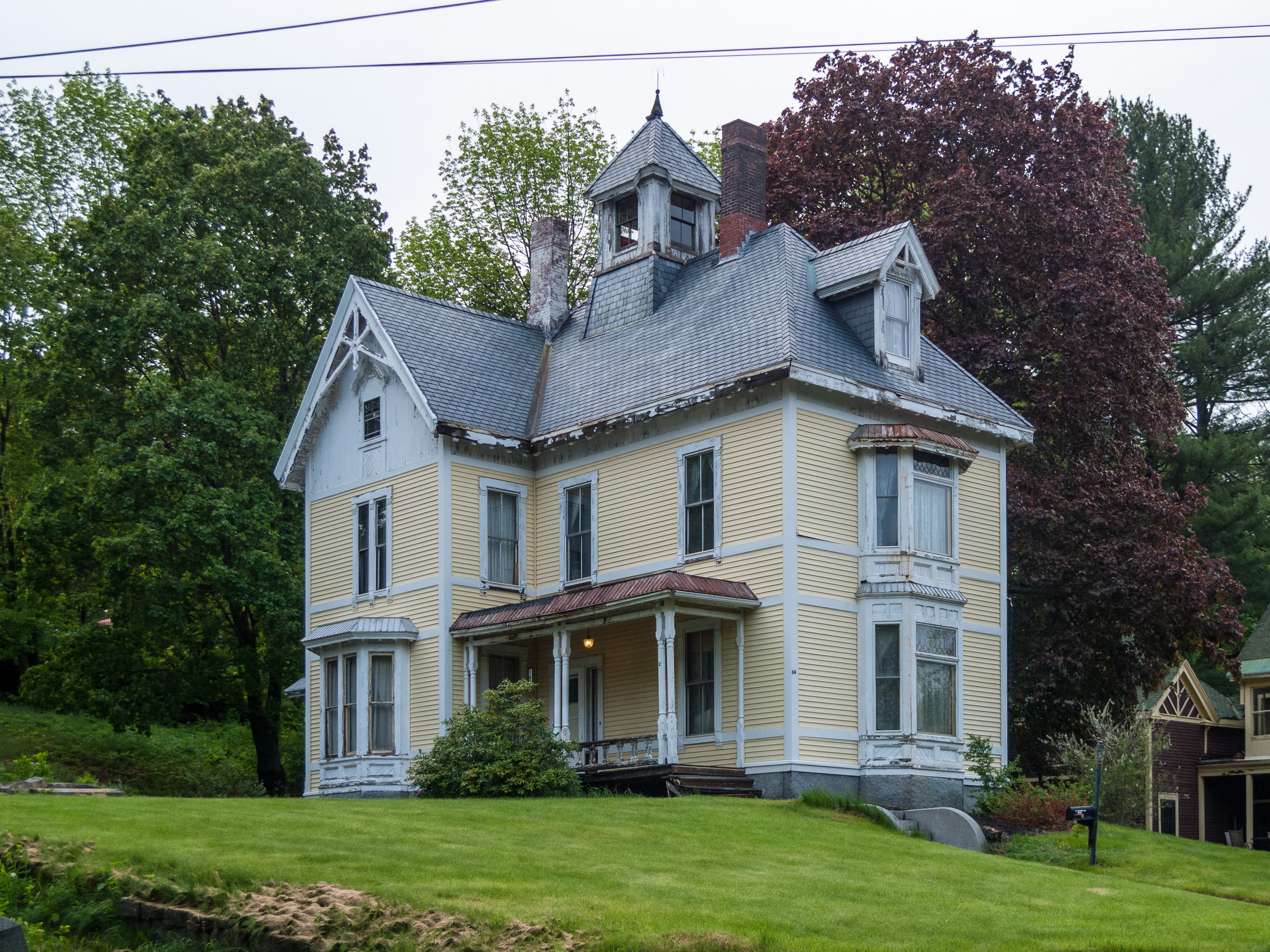

- Location within Maine Location within the United States
- Location: 64 Highland Ave., Auburn, Maine, U.S.
- Coordinates: 44°6′0″N 70°14′4″W
- Built: 1878
- Architect: Stevens & Coombs
- Architectural style: Late Victorian
- NRHP reference No.: 01001422
- Added to NRHP: December 31, 2001

The Gay-Munroe House is an historic house located at 64 Highland Avenue in Auburn, in the U.S. state of Maine. Built in 1878 for Charles Gay, a local shoe manufacturer, it features an architecturally eclectic mix of Late Victorian decorations. It is also notable as the home for many years of Willard Noble Munroe, another leading shoe manufacturer. The house was listed on the National Register of Historic Places in 2001.

== Description and history ==
The Gay-Munroe House stands on the west side of Highland Avenue, in a residential area northwest of Auburn's central business district. It is a 2 1/2-story wood-frame structure, with a roughly T-shaped plan that has a hip roof and cross gable projecting section, with a hip-roof ell extending to the rear. A square cupola with pyramidal roof stands atop the roof between brick chimneys. The building is clad predominantly in vinyl siding, but most of its 19th-century decorative trim elements have been preserved. The front facade consists of a single projecting bay, two stories in height, with a narrow gable-roof dormer projecting from the roof. The dormer is decorated with Stick style woodwork, a detail repeated in the larger projecting side gable section. A single-story porch stands in the corner made by that section, supported by turned posts and balustrade. String courses of trim band the building at the lintel and sill levels of the windows on both levels.

The house was designed by the Lewiston firm of Stevens & Coombs, and was built in 1878 for Charles Gay, who was involved in Auburn's shoe industry, its major economic force. In 1894 the house was purchased by Willard Noble Munroe, founder and first president of the Auburn Shoe Manufacturer's Association. He also served as treasurer of Quebec's Brompton Pulp and Paper Company, one of Canada's largest paper companies at the time.

== See also ==
- National Register of Historic Places listings in Androscoggin County, Maine
