= Savings Bank Block =

- U.S. National Register of Historic Places
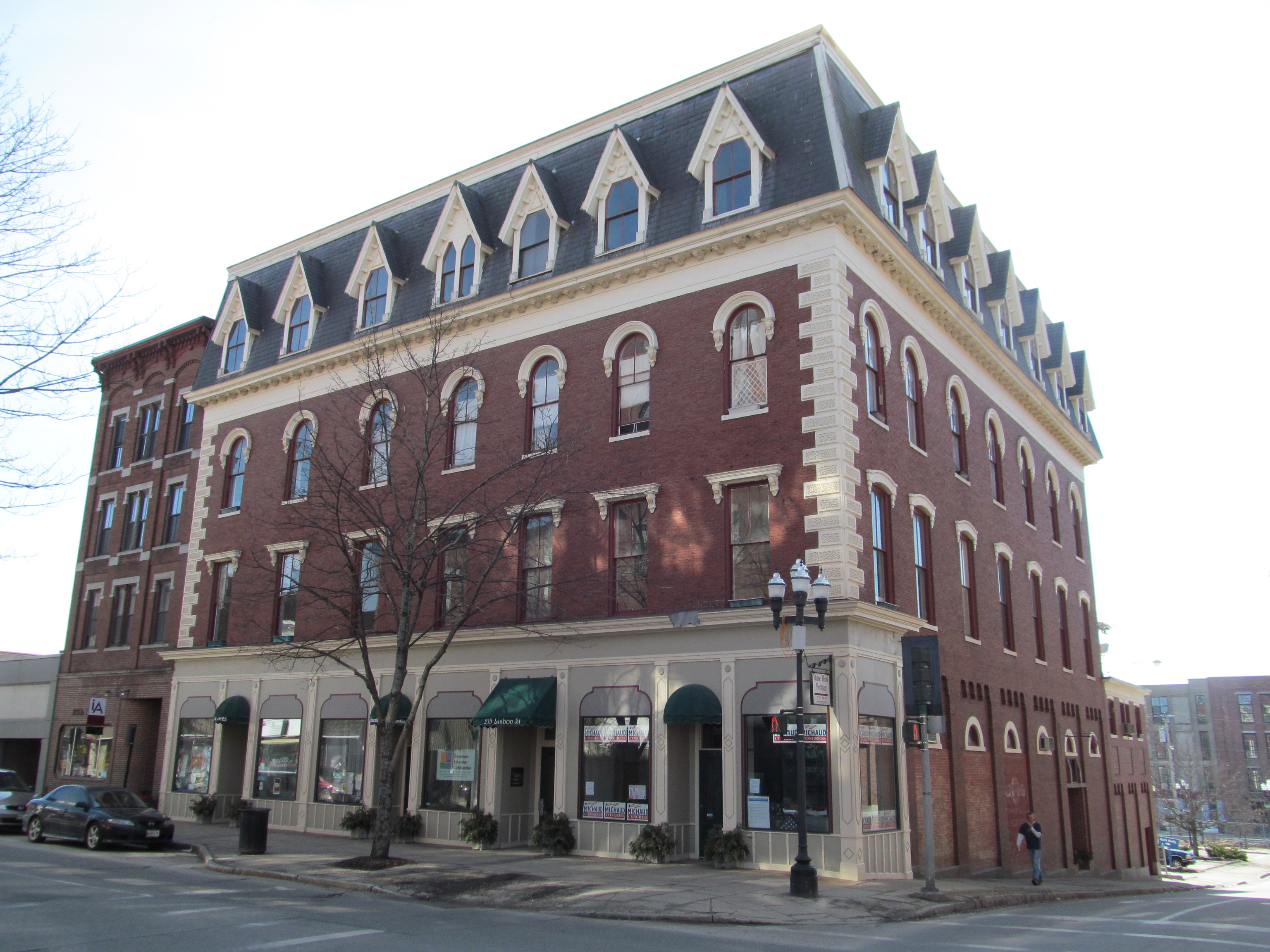
- Savings Bank Block

- Location within Maine Location within the United States
- Location: Lewiston, Maine
- Coordinates: 44°5′43″N 70°12′56″W
- Built: 1868
- Built by: George Hanson; J.P. Norton
- Architect: William H. Stevens
- Architectural style: Second Empire
- NRHP reference No.: 78000323
- Added to NRHP: January 20, 1978

The Savings Bank Block is an historic commercial building at 215 Lisbon Street in downtown Lewiston, Maine. Built in 1870, it is a fine local example of commercial Second Empire architecture, and is representative of the city's early development as an industrial center. It was added to the National Register of Historic Places in 1978.

== Description and history ==
The Savings Bank Block is located in downtown Lewiston, at the southwest corner of Lisbon and Pine Streets. It is a three-story brick building, topped by a mansard roof that provides a full fourth floor. The ground floor consists of three storefronts, which have modernized finishes. The building corners have stone quoining, rising to an entablature and modillioned cornice. The roof is pierced by dormers with steeply pitched gable roofs with bracketed eaves. On the second floor the Lisbon Street windows are set in rectangular openings with bracketed cornices, while those facing Pine Street are set in segmented-arch openings. Third-floor windows on both facades are set in round-arch openings with stone hoods.

Construction on the block was begun in 1868 and completed in 1870. Built as the home of the Lewiston Institution for Savings, it may have been designed by local architect William H. Stevens, who was closely associated with the bank's officers. The building originally housed retail spaces on the ground floor, offices on the second, and a Masonic lodge hall above.

== See also ==
- National Register of Historic Places listings in Androscoggin County, Maine
