= Bradford House (Lewiston, Maine) =

Historic house in Maine, United States

- Formerly listed on the U.S. National Register of Historic Places
- Location within Maine Location within the United States
- Location: 54–56 Pine Street, Lewiston, Maine
- Coordinates: 44°5′47″N 70°12′52″W
- Built: 1876
- Architect: Stevens & Coombs
- Architectural style: Second Empire
- NRHP reference No.: 78000154

Significant dates
- Added to NRHP: December 22, 1978
- Removed from NRHP: July 14, 2015

The Bradford House was an historic house in Lewiston, Maine, United States.

The three-story brick building was built in 1876 and added to the National Register of Historic Places in 1978. It was extensively damaged by fire on July 4, 2007, and was later demolished. It was removed from the National Register in 2015.

== See also ==
- National Register of Historic Places listings in Androscoggin County, Maine
