= Sen. William P. Frye House =

Historic house in Maine, United States

- U.S. National Register of Historic Places
- U.S. Historic district – Contributing property
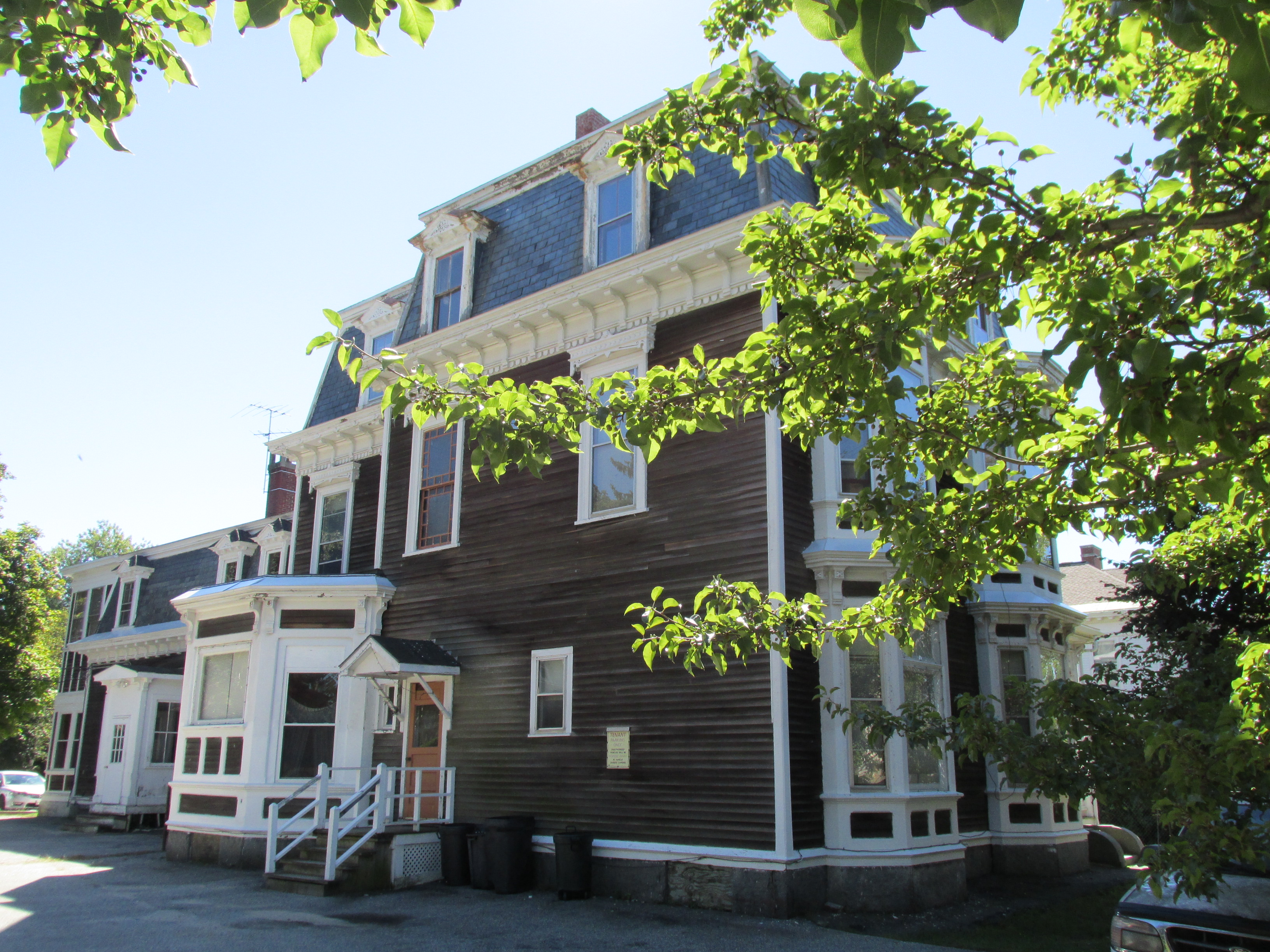
- Sen. William P. Frye House

- Location within Maine Location within the United States
- Location: Lewiston, Maine
- Coordinates: 44°6′22″N 70°12′40″W
- Built: 1874
- Architect: Fassett & Stevens
- Architectural style: Second Empire
- Part of: Main Street – Frye Street Historic District (ID08001355)
- NRHP reference No.: 76000189

Significant dates
- Added to NRHP: October 8, 1976
- Designated CP: January 23, 2009

The Senator William P. Frye House is a historic house at 453-461 Main Street in Lewiston, Maine. Built in 1874, it is a fine example of Second Empire architecture in the city, designed by local architects Fassett & Stevens for William P. Frye, a mayor of Lewiston and a United States senator. The house was listed on the National Register of Historic Places in 1976.

== Description and history ==
The Frye House is located north of downtown Lewiston, at the southeast corner of Frye Street and Main Street (United States Route 202). It is a two-story wood-frame structure, with a mansard roof providing a full third floor. The roofline below the steep portion of the roof is modillioned and dentillated, and the line between the roof levels also has a projecting cornice. The roof is studded with gabled dormers. William P. Frye served as United States Senate Majority Leader and was a trustee of Bates College which is adjacent to his home. Windows on the sides are topped by decorative hoods, while the front-facing facade has two-story polygonal window bays. A sympathetic two-story addition extends to the rear of the house, along Frye Street.

The house was built in 1874 to a design by Fassett & Stevens. The house was built for William P. Frye, a lawyer whose record of public service included mayor of Lewiston, state representative, United States Congressman, Maine Attorney General, and United States Senator. He was, along with James G. Blaine, one of Maine's leading political figures of the period.

== See also ==
- National Register of Historic Places listings in Androscoggin County, Maine
