= Lewiston Main Post Office =

- U.S. Post Office–Lewiston Maine
- U.S. National Register of Historic Places
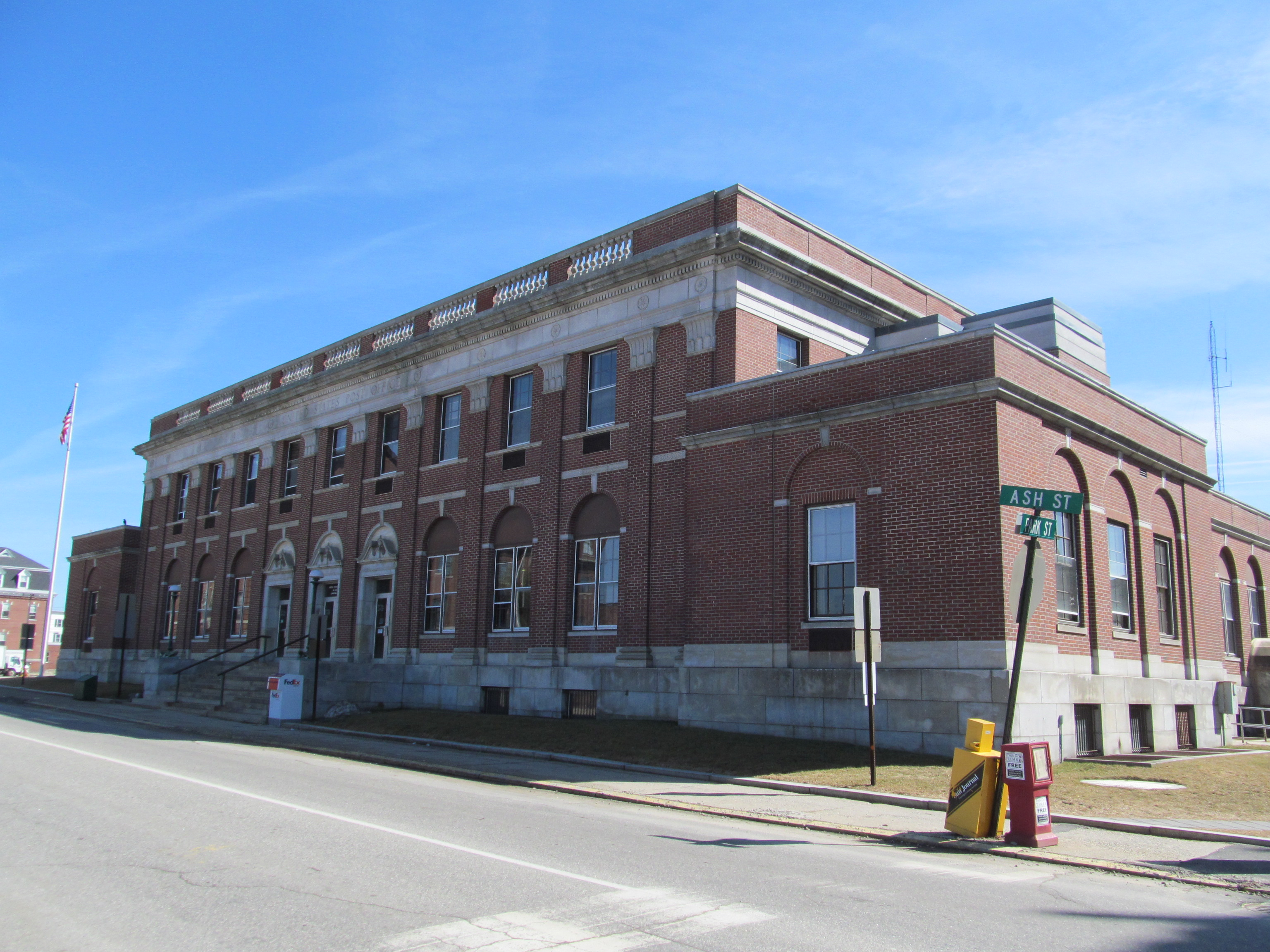
- United States Post Office

- Location within Maine Location within the United States
- Location: 49 Ash St., Lewiston, Maine
- Coordinates: 44.09656°N 70.21563°W
- Area: 0.5 acres (0.20 ha)
- Built: 1933
- Built by: Coath & Goss
- Architect: James A. Wetmore
- Architectural style: Colonial Revival
- NRHP reference No.: 86000879
- Added to NRHP: May 2, 1986

The Lewiston Maine Post Office of Lewiston, Maine is located at 49 Ash Street in downtown Lewiston. Built in 1933 and enlarged in 1975, it is a fine local example of Colonial Revival architecture. The building was listed on the National Register of Historic Places in 1986 as U.S. Post Office–Lewiston Maine.

== Description and history ==
The Lewiston Main Post Office is located one block east of the city's central Lisbon Street business district. The original 1933 portion of the building faces north onto Ash Street. It is two stories in height, with a frame of steel and concrete, and an exterior of stone brick. The central portion is nine bays wide, articulated by brick pilasters with stone bases and capitals. The first-floor bays have rounded-arch openings, the central three housing entrances, and the outer six windows. A stone entablature is topped by a dentillated cornice and a parapet with stone balusters and brick piers. The central main section is flanked by matching single-story sections, with a modern service wing to the rear. The interior of the central block is houses the main lobby in the front half and a work area to the rear, with the postmaster's office to one side, and is richly decorated.

The building was designed by the Office of the Supervising Architect of the United States Treasury Department, then under the guidance of James A. Wetmore, and was constructed in 1934-35. Its elaborate detailing probably benefited from an increase of the staff of that office pursuant to the Federal Employment Stabilzation Act of 1931. The modern service wing was added to the rear in 1975.

== See also ==
- National Register of Historic Places listings in Androscoggin County, Maine
- List of United States post offices
