= Odd Fellows Block (Lewiston, Maine) =

- U.S. National Register of Historic Places
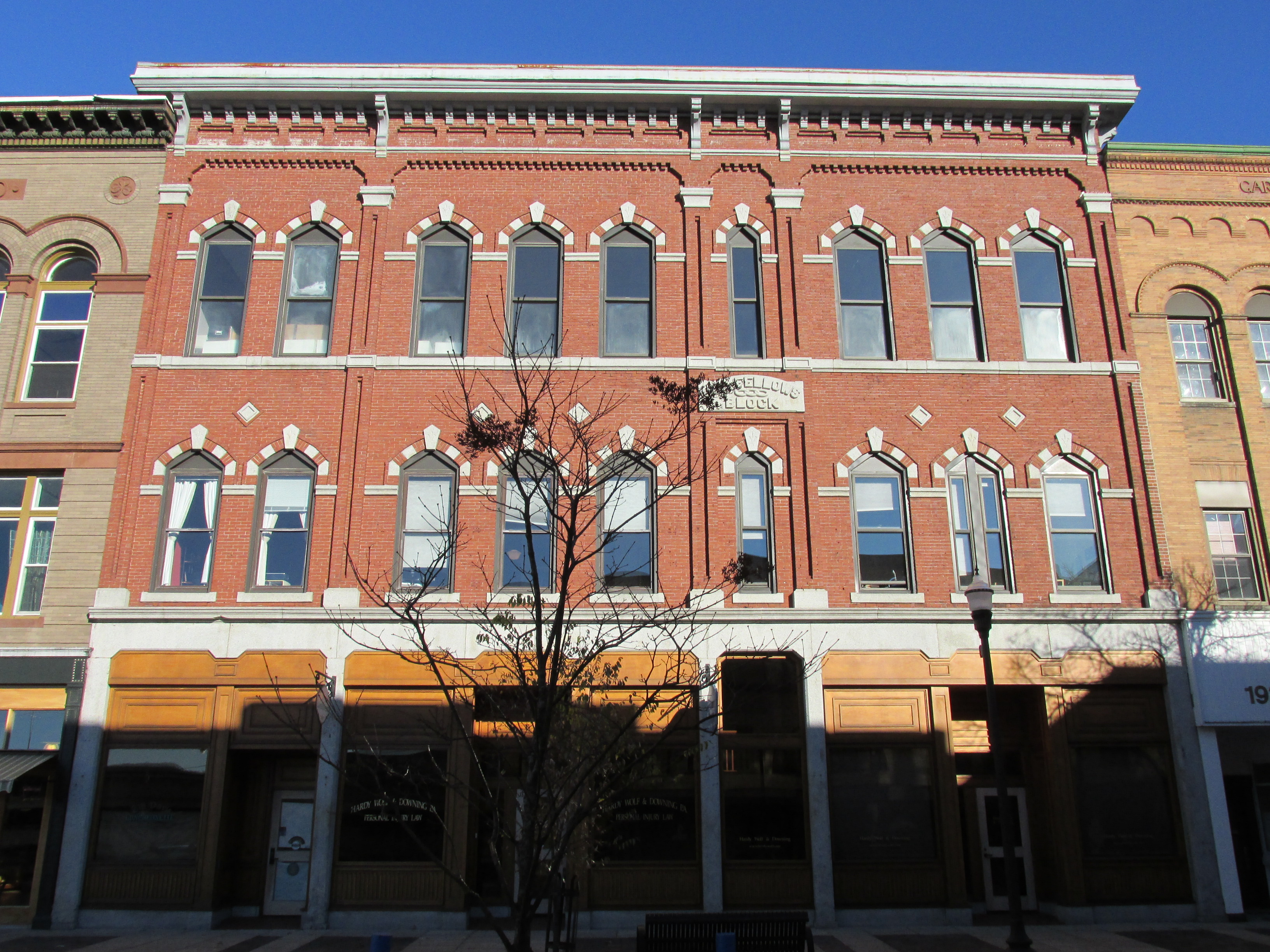
- Odd Fellows Block

- Location within Maine Location within the United States
- Location: 182-190 Lisbon St., Lewiston, Maine
- Coordinates: 44°5′44″N 70°13′1″W
- Area: 0.3 acres (0.12 ha)
- Built: 1876
- Architect: Stevens & Coombs
- Architectural style: Gothic
- MPS: Lewiston Commercial District MRA
- NRHP reference No.: 86002288
- Added to NRHP: April 25, 1986

The Odd Fellows Block is a historic commercial building at 182-190 Lisbon Street in Lewiston, Maine. Built in 1876, it is an important early work of Lewiston architect George M. Coombs, then in partnership with William H. Stevens. It is a significant local example of commercial Victorian Gothic architecture, which typified Lewiston's downtown of the period. The building was listed on the National Register of Historic Places in 1986.

== Description and history ==
The Odd Fellows Block is located on Lisbon Street, Lewiston's principal commercial downtown thoroughfare, between Ash and Pine Streets. It is a three-story masonry structure, built of brick with stone trim. The facade is irregularly arranged, its nine bays articulated in a 2-3-1-3 pattern by stone piers on the first floor, and paneled brick pilasters at the upper levels. The storefronts feature wood paneling above and below plate glass windows, and recessed entrances. The upper levels are separated by a stone stringcourse, and feature sash windows set in pointed-arch openings with alternating stone and brick voussoirs, and stone keystones. A wooden cornice projects at the top.

The building was constructed in 1876, originally to house retail space on the ground floor, and meeting facilities of the local chapter of the International Order of Odd Fellows (IOOF). The IOOF hall was used by a large number of local organizations as a meeting space. The building was designed by George M. Coombs, then early in his long and prolific career, in partnership with William H. Stevens, who died in 1880. Architecturally, the building is typical of Lewiston's commercial buildings of the period, and is one of the few to survive from that time.
