= List of city nicknames in Maine =

This partial list of city nicknames in Maine compiles the aliases, sobriquets and slogans that cities in Maine are known by. City nicknames can help in establishing a civic identity, helping outsiders recognize a community or attracting people to a community because of its nickname; promote civic pride; and build community unity. Nicknames and slogans that successfully create a new community "ideology or myth" are also believed to have economic value. Their economic value is difficult to measure, but there are anecdotal reports of cities that have achieved substantial economic benefits by "branding" themselves by adopting new slogans.

- Bangor – The Queen City of the East
- Bath – The City of Ships
- Cherryfield – Blueberry Capital of the World
- Farmington
  - Earmuff Capital of the World
  - Farm Town
- Freeport – Birthplace of Maine
- Lincoln – The Gateway Town
- Lewiston
  - Little Canada
  - The Dirty Lew
- Millinocket – The Magic City
- Portland – Forest City (reported in 1894)
- Presque Isle – The Star City
- Rockland
  - Lime City
  - Lobster Capital of the World
- Skowhegan – Skowvegas
- Strong – Toothpick Capital of the World
- Waterville
  - The Elm City
  - The University City of Maine

== See also ==
- List of city nicknames in the United States
