= Farwell Mill =

- U.S. National Register of Historic Places
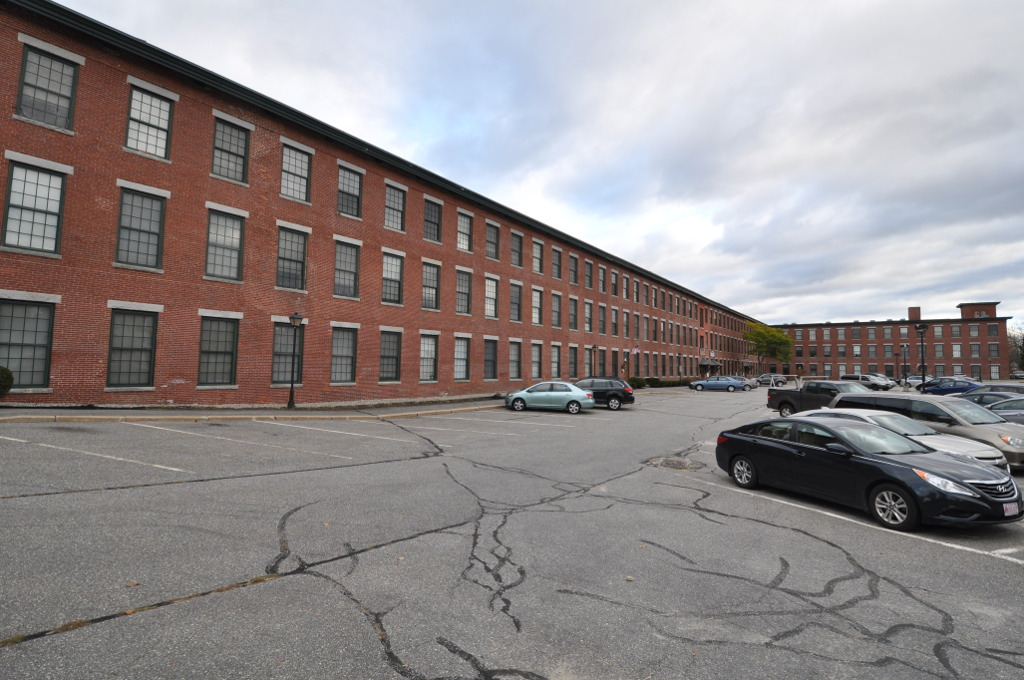

- Location within Maine Location within the United States
- Location: 244 Lisbon Street, Lisbon, Maine
- Coordinates: 44°1′52″N 70°6′15″W
- Area: 2 acres (0.81 ha)
- Built: 1872
- Architect: William H. Stevens
- Architectural style: Italianate
- NRHP reference No.: 85001260
- Added to NRHP: June 20, 1985

The Farwell Mill is an historic former mill complex at 244 Lisbon Street (Maine State Route 196) in Lisbon, Maine. Built in 1872, it is a fine example of a cotton mill built at the height of the Industrial Revolution. It was listed on the National Register of Historic Places in 1985. It is now residential housing.

== Description and history ==
The Farwell Mill is located in central Lisbon, at the junction of Village and Lisbon Streets and on the western bank of the Sabattus River. It is a large and sprawling L-shaped brick three-story structure. The building is minimally decorated, with corbelling at the cornice below the gable roof, and a four-story tower at the southwestern end whose top level has paired round-arch Italianate windows and a shallow-pitch hip roof with a broad eave. The complex was originally larger, with four-story additions to the south and west, but these have been demolished. Just north of the main building is a small single-story gas works building, one of the few of its type surviving in the state.

The mill was built in 1872 by Nathaniel Farwell, a businessman with textile-related interests all over New England. This was the only full-scale textile operation he owned. It was built using the water privilege of one of Maine's earliest woolen mills, established in 1808, and expanded using a second water privilege just downstream that originally had a grist mill. Farwell's mill was reported to have a capacity of 12,000 spindles, and was an economic mainstay of the otherwise rural region for many years.

== See also ==
- National Register of Historic Places listings in Androscoggin County, Maine
