= Lewiston Public Library =

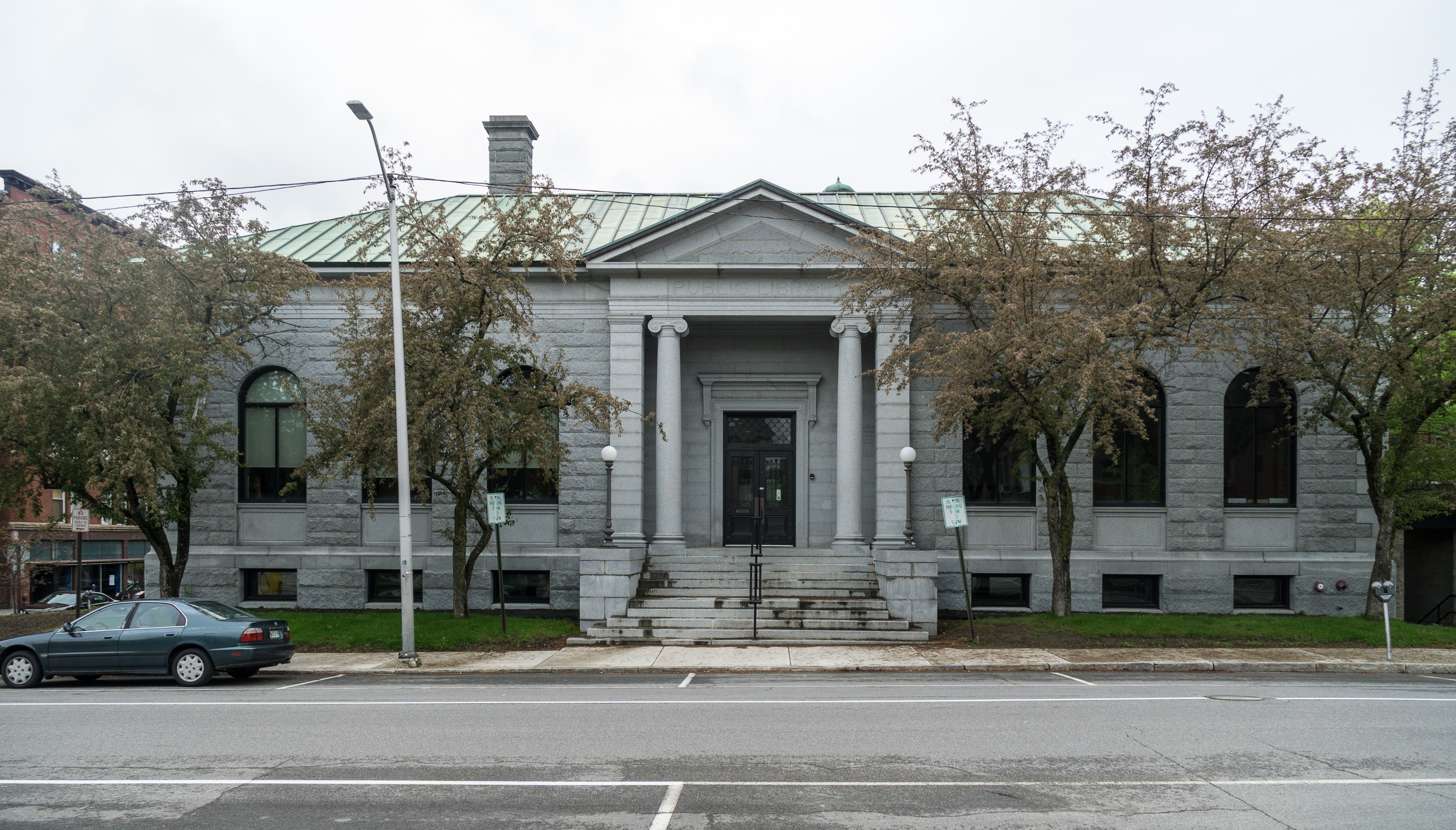
- Location: Lewiston, Maine, United States
- Type: Public
- Established: 1902

Collection
- Size: 165,000

Access and use
- Circulation: 200,000
- Population served: 36,592

Other information
- Budget: $1,284,718
- Director: Marcela Peres
- Employees: 32
- Website: http://lplonline.org/
- Lewiston Public Library
- U.S. National Register of Historic Places
- Location: Park and Pine Sts., Lewiston, Maine
- Coordinates: 44.09545°N 70.21622°W
- Built: 1902
- Architects: Coombs & Gibbs, Greenleaf & Doring
- NRHP reference No.: 78000157
- Added to NRHP: January 31, 1978

The Lewiston Public Library is a historic public Carnegie library at Park and Pine Street in Lewiston, Maine. They provide resources about topics regarding culture, education, and information needed for all children, teens, adults, seniors, families, and all organization in their city.

== History ==
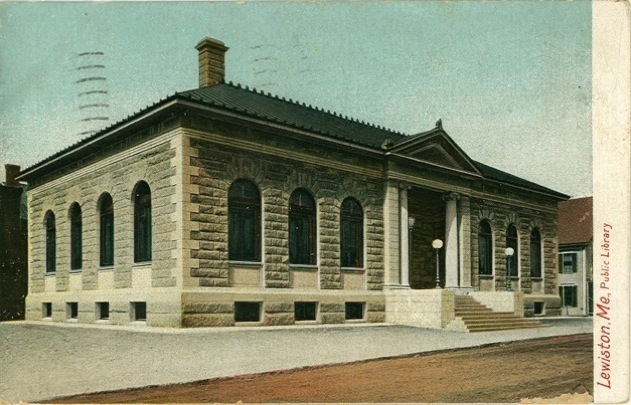
Old postcard of Lewiston, Maine public library

In 1902 Andrew Carnegie donated $60,000 (equivalent to $2,232,692 in 2025) for a new granite building with the understanding that the city would fund staff, books, and materials. Granite was acquired from North Jay and Norridgewock to be used for the construction. The vestibule was modeled after the Greek design with columns 18 feet high and 25 inches in circumference. Woodwork of fine oak is found on the fireplace mantels and oak pillars. The original library located in Lewiston City Hall was known as the Manufacturers and Mechanics Library. The library was formed on January 26, 1861, and existed until the first Lewiston City Hall burned on January 7, 1890. The current library still has several volumes that have the Manufacturers and Mechanics library stamps in them.

== Design ==
The Colonial Revival library building was constructed in 1902 by Coombs & Gibbs. The building was added to the National Register of Historic Places in 1978.

== Expansion ==
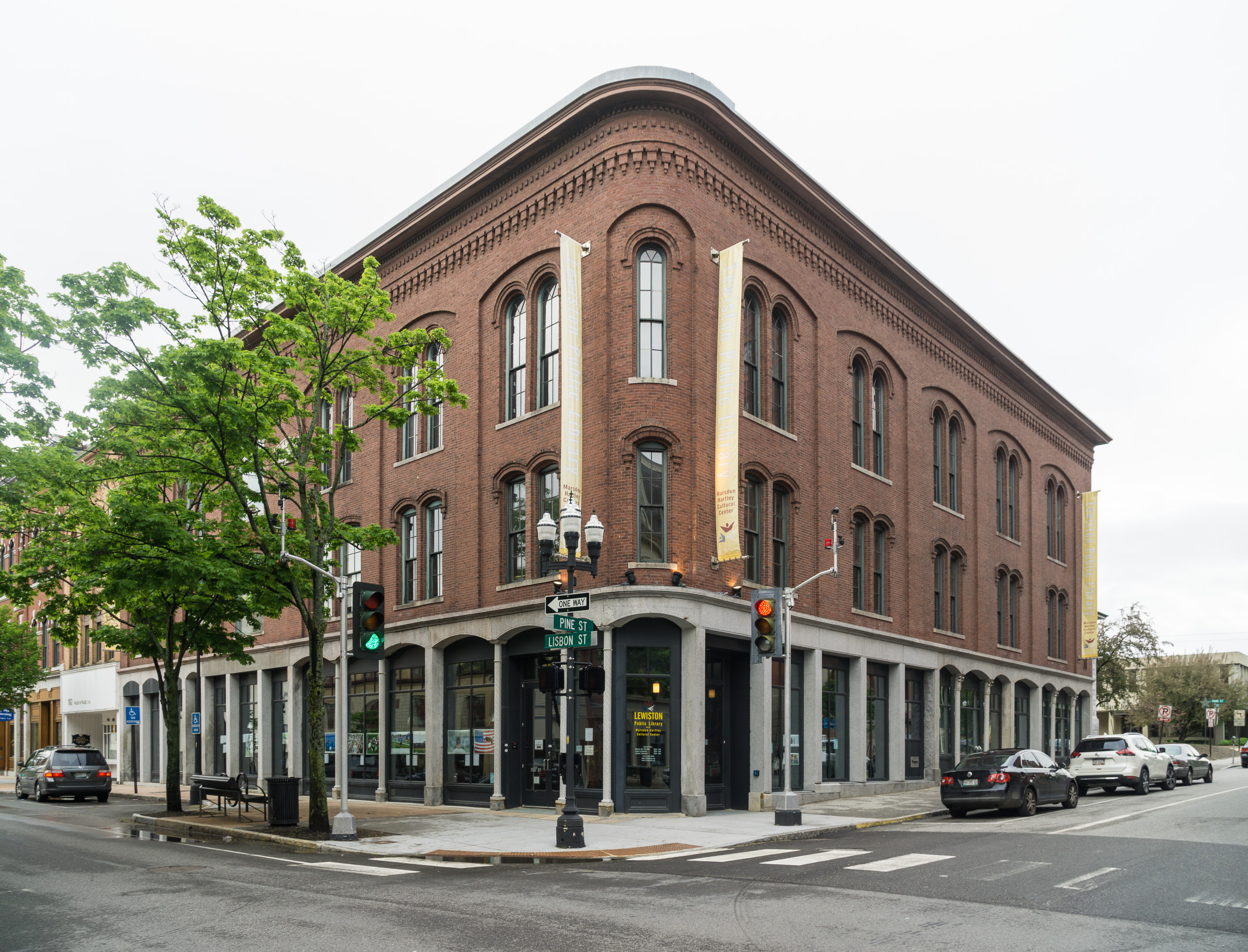
Lewiston Public Library Lisbon Street expansion.

The building was significantly renovated in 1996, including moving the main entrance one block to the west. The Marsden Hartley Cultural Center was opened in 2005 and is named for Lewiston's native son Marsden Hartley, a renowned artist/poet.

== See also ==
- National Register of Historic Places listings in Androscoggin County, Maine
