= Lewiston, Maine =

City in Maine, United States

- City
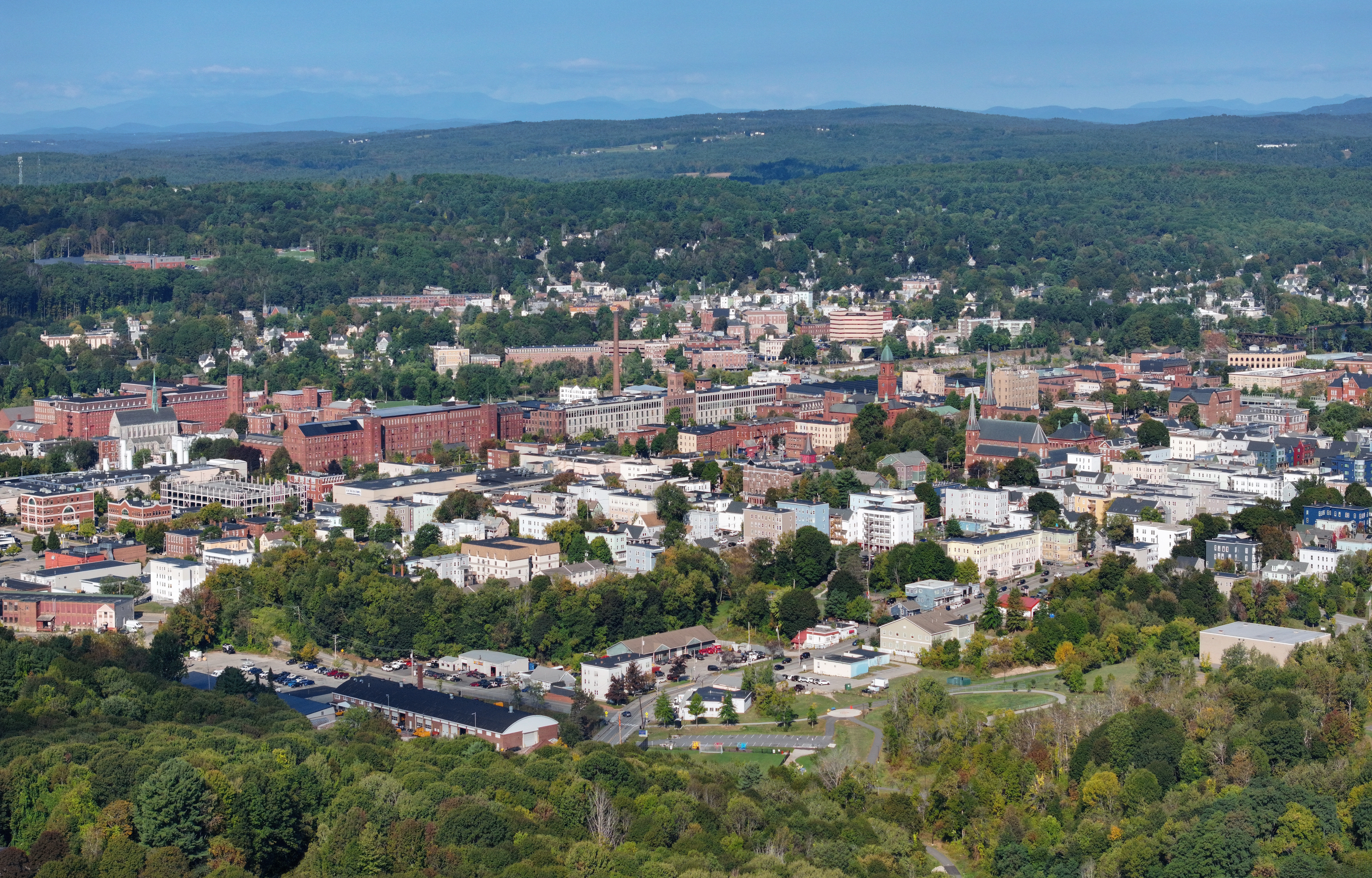
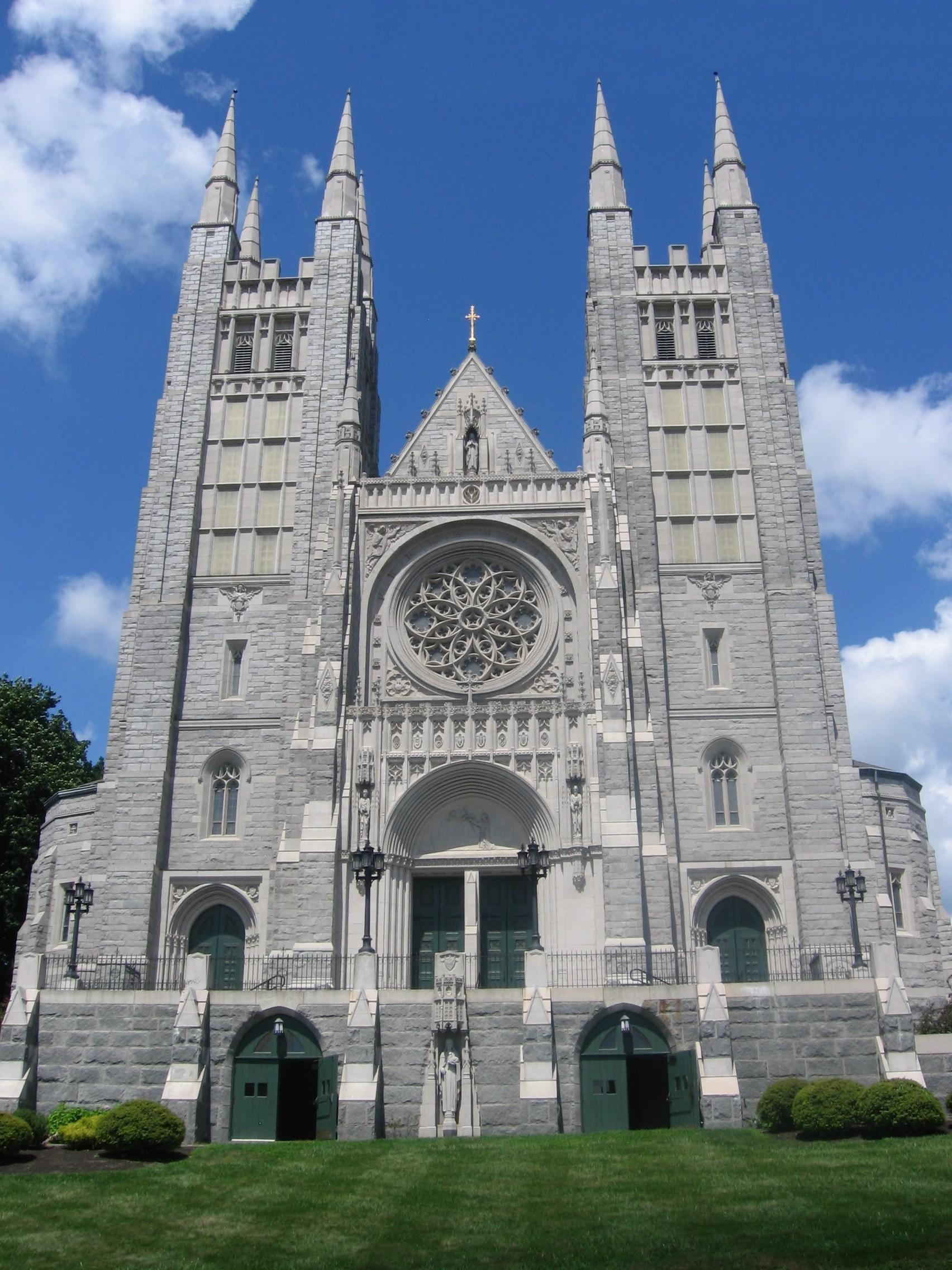
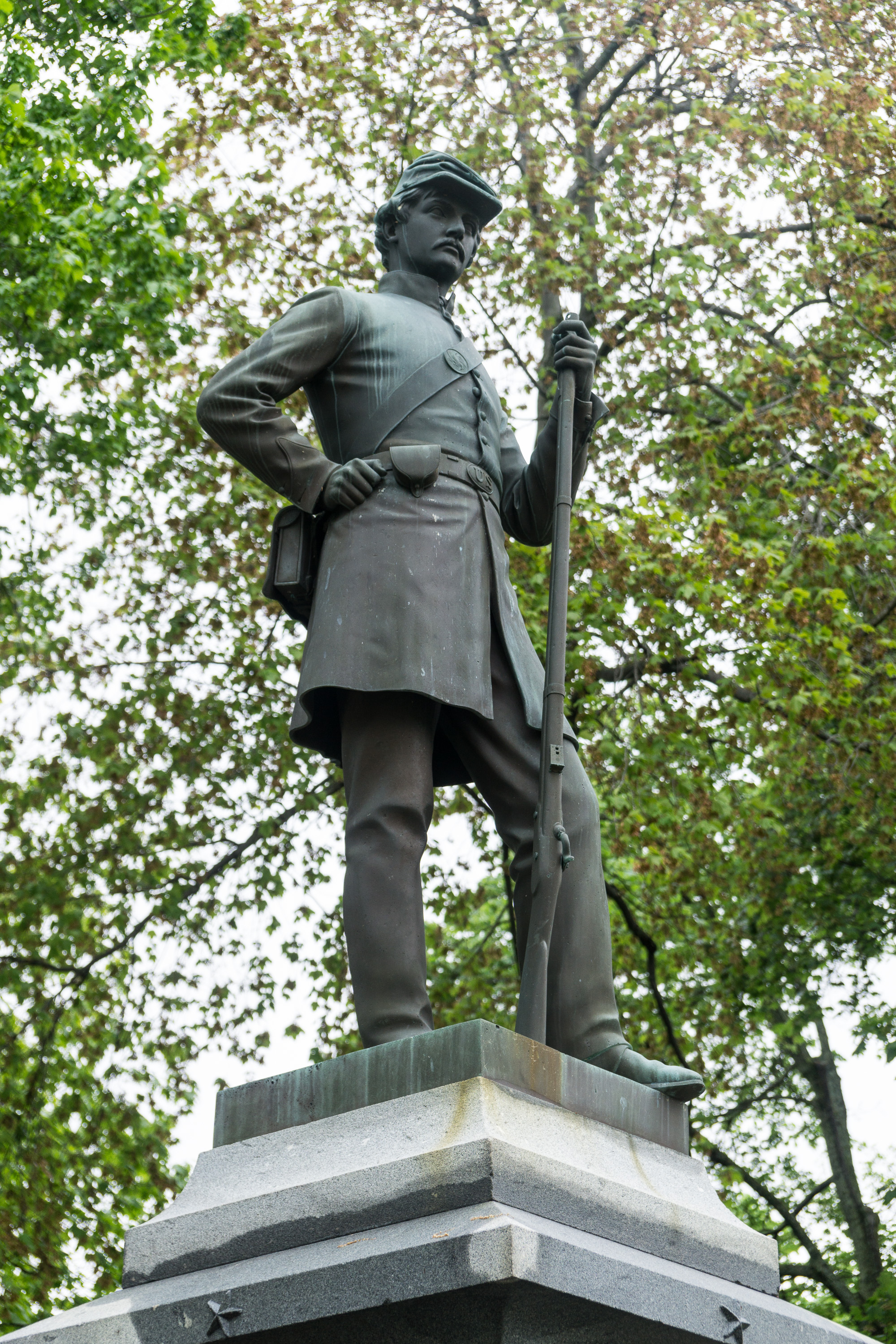
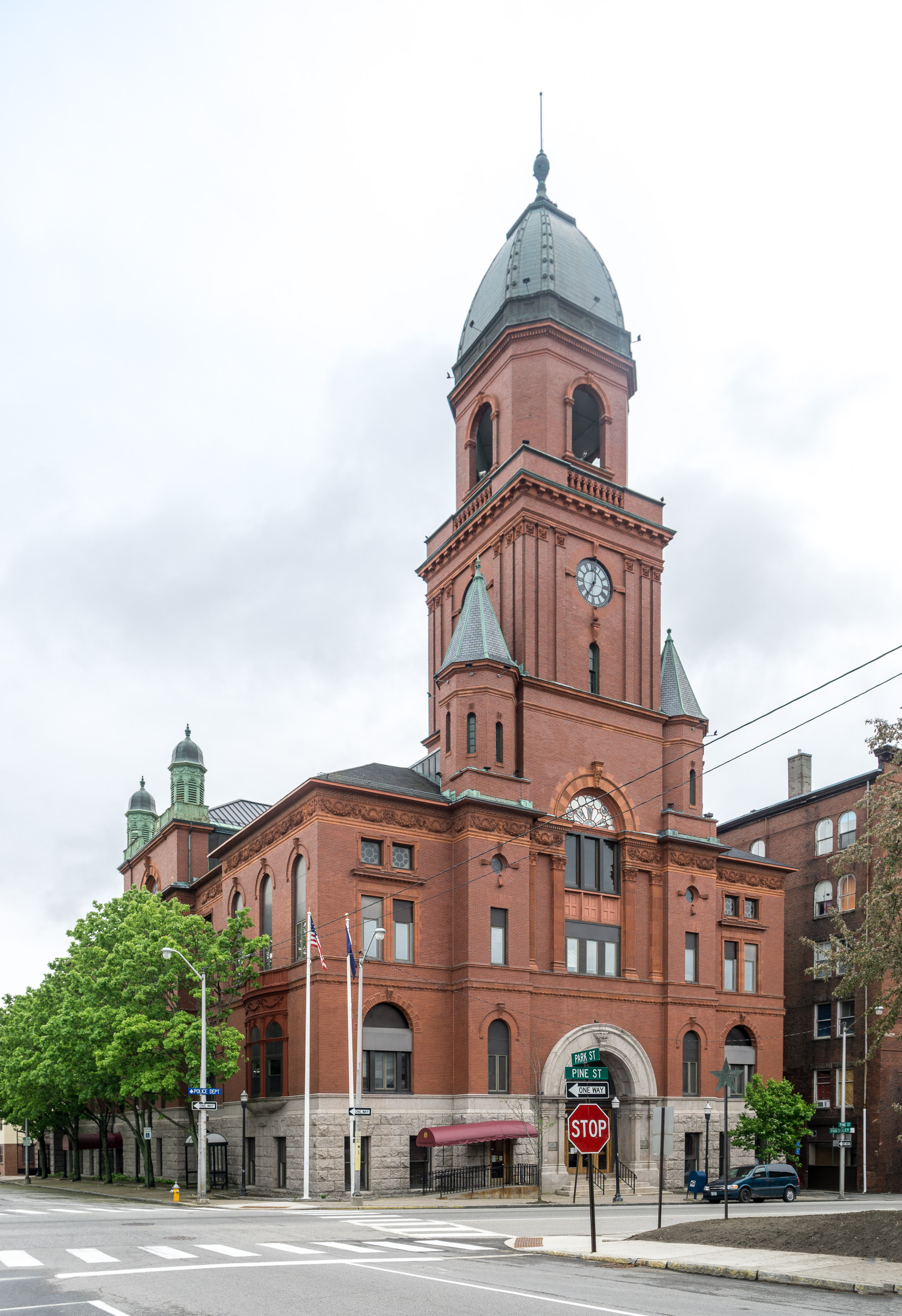
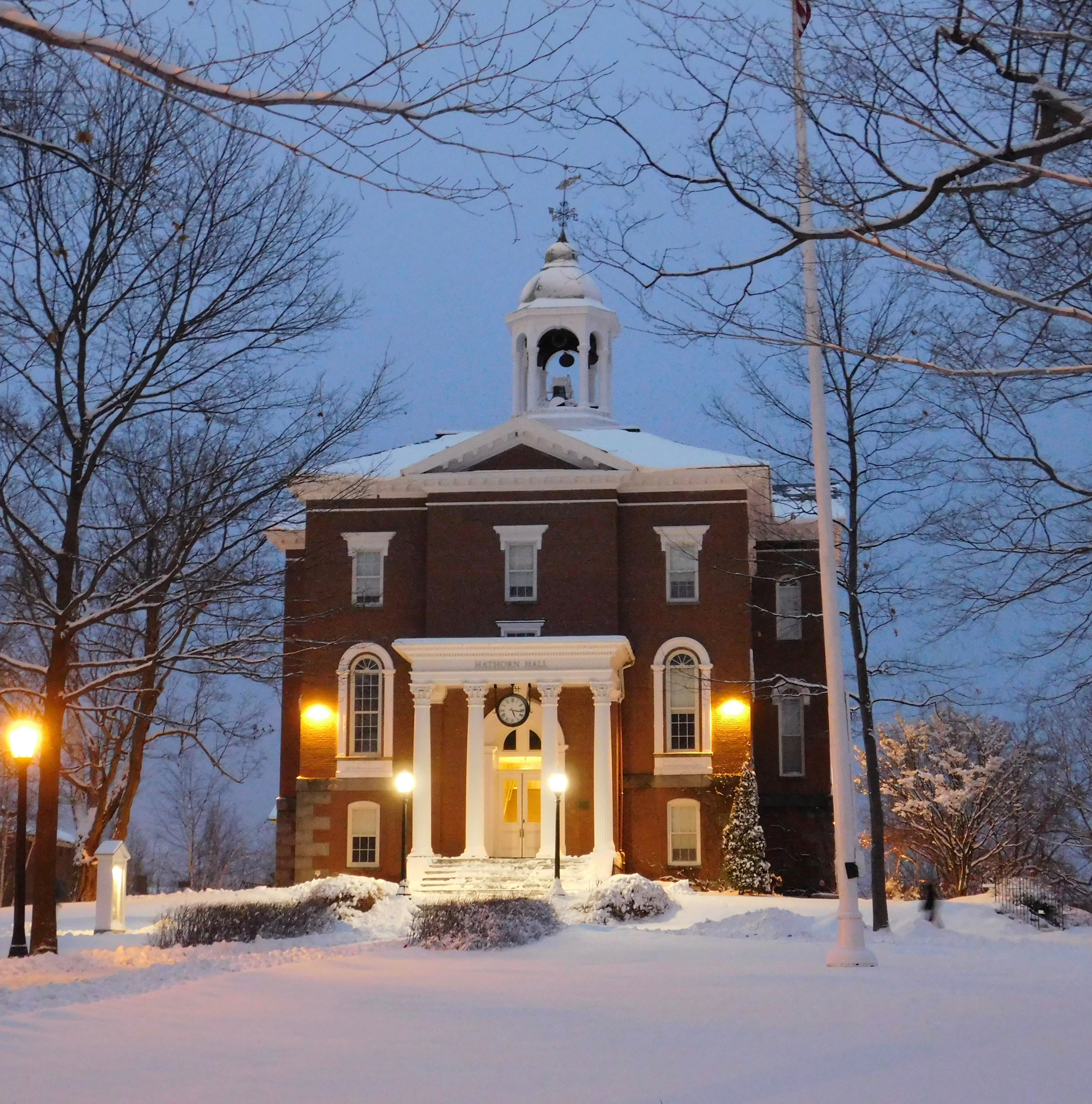
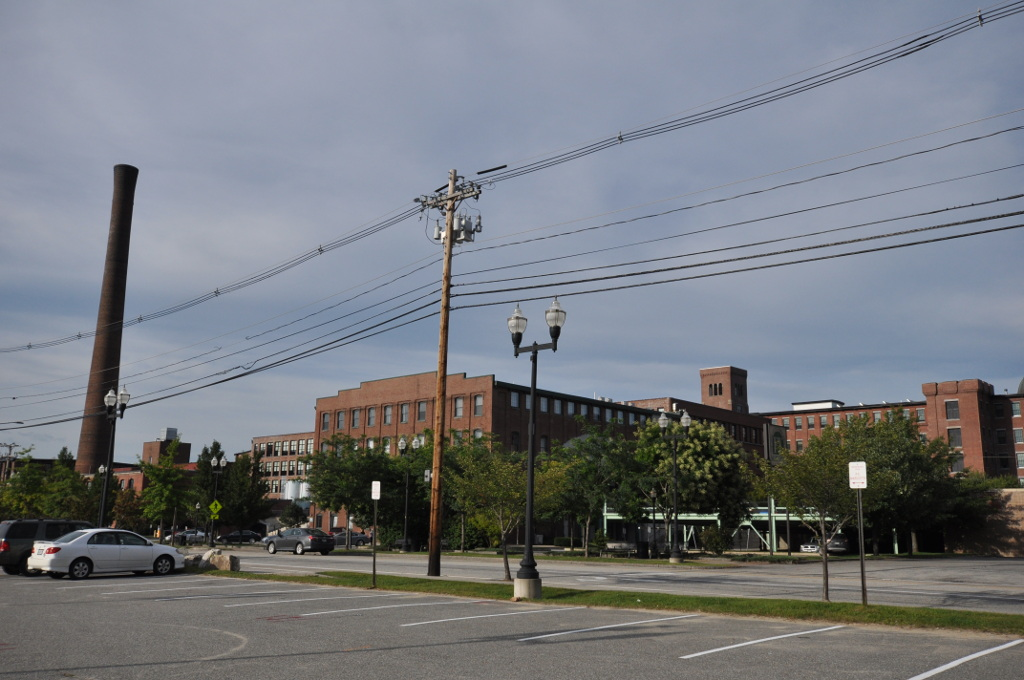
- Skyline Basilica of Saints Peter and Paul Civil War Memorial City Hall Bates College Bates Mill

- Seal
- Nicknames: "The Lew"; "Little Canada"
- Motto(s): Industria (Latin) "Industry"
- Location in Maine Location in the United States
- Coordinates: 44°06′42″N 70°08′45″W
- Country: United States
- State: Maine
- County: Androscoggin
- Incorporated: 1795 (as Lewistown); 1863 (as Lewiston)
- Village: South Lewiston

Government
  - Type: City council
  - Mayor: Carl Sheline

Area
  - Total: 35.53 sq mi (92.03 km^{2})
  - Land: 34.15 sq mi (88.44 km^{2})
  - Water: 1.39 sq mi (3.60 km^{2}) 4%
- Elevation: 358 ft (109 m)

Population (2020)
  - Total: 37,121
  - Density: 1,087.1/sq mi (419.74/km^{2})
  - Demonym: Lewistonian
- Time zone: UTC−5 (EST)
  - Summer (DST): UTC−4 (EDT)
- ZIP Code: 04240, 04241, 04243
- Area code: 207
- FIPS code: 23-38740
- GNIS feature ID: 582554
- Website: www.lewistonmaine.gov

Lewiston (/ˈluːɪstən/ LOO-is-tən) is the second-most populous city in the U.S. state of Maine, with a population of 37,121, according to the 2020 United States census. Located in Androscoggin County, the city lies halfway between Augusta, the state capital, and Portland, the state's largest city. Lewiston forms one half of the Lewiston–Auburn, Maine Metropolitan Statistical Area (known as "L/A" or "L-A"). The city has been recognized for its low cost of living, access to healthcare, and low crime rate.

Prior to European settlement, the region was inhabited by the Androscoggin people, an Abenaki tribe for whom the county is named. Lewiston was first settled in 1760 and incorporated as Lewistown in 1795. As the city industrialized, it experienced significant Irish and French Canadian immigration. It has the largest French-speaking population in the U.S., by population, second to only St. Martin Parish, Louisiana, by percentage.

The city became an important educational center in 1855 when local statesman Oren Burbank Cheney and industrialist Benjamin Bates founded what would become Bates College. The city has 44 properties listed on the National Register of Historic Places, the Androscoggin Bank Colisée, and two major medical centers: Central Maine Medical Center and Saint Mary's Regional Medical Center. The only basilica in Maine is the city's Basilica of Saints Peter and Paul.

== History ==
=== Androscoggin homeland ===
Prior to European colonization, the region of Lewiston was inhabited by the Androscoggin, an Abenaki people. During the 17th century, Androscoggin were among the first Native American tribes to make contact with European colonists in Maine. Relations soon deteriorated over colonial expansion, and conflicts with colonists and epidemics of infectious diseases devastated the Androscoggin, which responded by migrating to New France from 1669 onwards. By 1680, the Androscoggin had been completely driven out of Maine. The governor of New France, Louis de Buade, allocated them two seigneuries on the Saint Francis River.

=== Colonial beginnings ===
A grant comprising the area of Lewiston was given to Moses Little and Jonathan Bagley, members of the Pejepscot Proprietors, colonial land investors, on January 28, 1768, on the condition that fifty families live in the area before June 1, 1774. Bagley and Little named the new town Lewistown. Paul Hildreth was the first man to settle in Lewiston in the fall of 1770. By 1795, Lewiston was officially incorporated as a town.

=== Industrialization ===
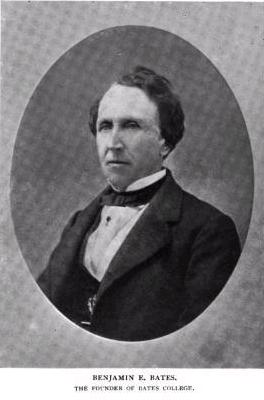
Textile tycoon Benjamin Bates, 1895

Lewiston began to industrialize in the 19th century complementing a slow but steadily growing farming effort throughout its early history. By the early-to-mid-19th century, as water power was being honed, Lewiston's location on the Androscoggin River would prove to make it an ideal location for emerging industry. In 1836, local entrepreneurs formed the Androscoggin Falls Dam, Lock & Canal Company:

...for the purpose of erecting and constructing dams, locks, canals, mills, works, machines, and buildings on their own lands and also manufacturing cotton, wool, iron, steel, and paper in the towns of Lewiston, Minot, and Danville.

The sales of stock attracted Boston investors—including Thomas J. Hill, Lyman Nichols, George L. Ward and Alexander De Witt. De Witt convinced prominent industrialist Benjamin Bates, who at the time oversaw the Union Pacific Railroad, to come to Lewiston and finance the emerging Lewiston Water Power Company. Soon after Bates arrived, the company created the first canal in the city. In the spring of 1850, some 400 Irish men recruited in and around Boston by construction contractor Patrick O'Donnell arrived in Lewiston and began work on the canal system. Impressed with the labor force and "working spirit" of the Lewistonions, Bates founded the Bates Manufacturing Company, leading to the construction of five mills starting with the flagship Bates Mill.

In August 1850, Maine Governor John Hubbard signed the incorporation act and the mill was completed 1852. Bates positioned the mill in Lewiston due to the location of the Lewiston Falls which provided the mill with power. Under Bates' supervision, during the Civil War, the mill produced textiles for the Union Army. His mills generated employment for thousands of Irish, Canadians, and immigrants from Europe. The mill was Maine's largest employer for three decades.

The creation of the Bates manufacturing trusts saw rapid economic growth, positioning the city as one of the wealthiest in Maine, and created budding affluent districts such as the Main Street–Frye Street Historic District. Although the majority of the population was working class, a distinctive upper class emerged at this time. The Bates Mill remained the largest employer in Lewiston from the 1850s to the mid-late 20th century. The Androscoggin & Kennebec Railroad was constructed by Irish laborers, many of whom joined the Lewiston canal construction crews in 1850. The Irish laborers and their families lived in shanty-town neighborhoods called "patches". By 1854, one quarter of Lewiston's population was Irish, the highest concentration in Maine.

During the Civil War, the high demand for textiles helped Lewiston develop a strong industrial base. In 1861, a flood of French Canadian immigration into Maine began, spawned by industrial work opportunities in Maine cities with water power from waterfalls. This brought a significant influx of Québécois millworkers who worked alongside Irish immigrants and Yankee mill girls. Lewiston's population boomed between 1840 and 1890 from 1,801 to 21,701. French Canadians settled in an area downtown that became known as Little Canada, which has remained largely Francophone ever since.

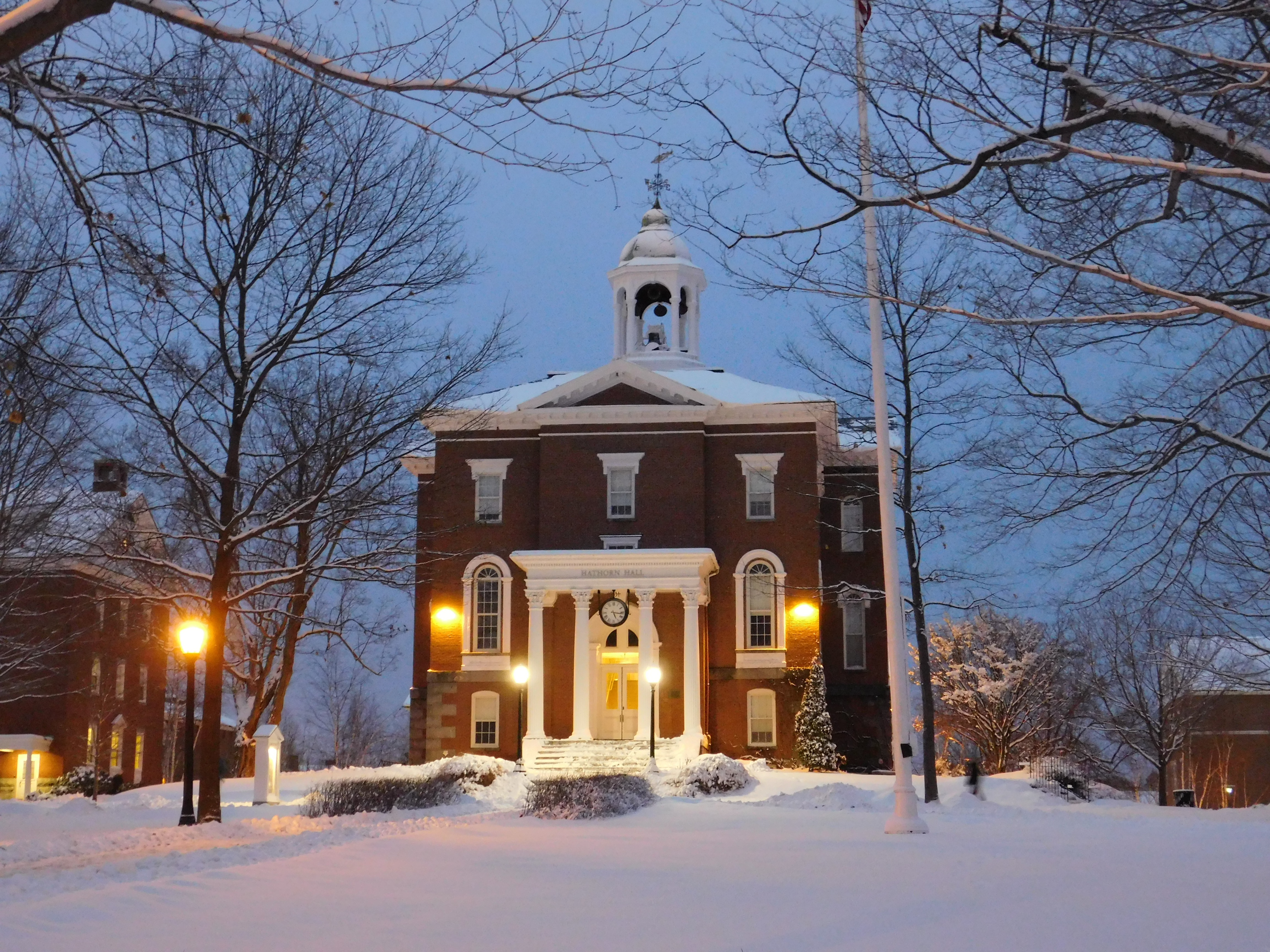
Bates College is a large land owner and employer in the city.

It was around this time, from the 1850s onward, that local minister and statesman Oren Burbank Cheney traveled from Parsonsfield to Lewiston to establish an institution of higher learning in the city. The Maine State Legislature was petitioned by Lewiston locals to found the Maine State Seminary in 1855. Opening that year, the school educated the working class of Maine while also providing education for blacks and women at a time when other universities barred their entrance. At its founding, it became the first coeducational college in New England.

Lewiston incorporated as a city in 1863 and the seminary was renamed Bates College a year later to honor early backer Benjamin Bates. In 1872, St. Peter's church was built in the city. In 1880, Le Messager, a French-language newspaper, began printing in Lewiston to serve its predominant ethnic population. The local Kora Shrine was organized in 1891 and held its first meetings in a Masonic temple on Lisbon Street. This group would from 1908 to 1910 build the Kora Temple on Sabattus Street, the largest home of a fraternal organization in the state.

=== 20th century ===
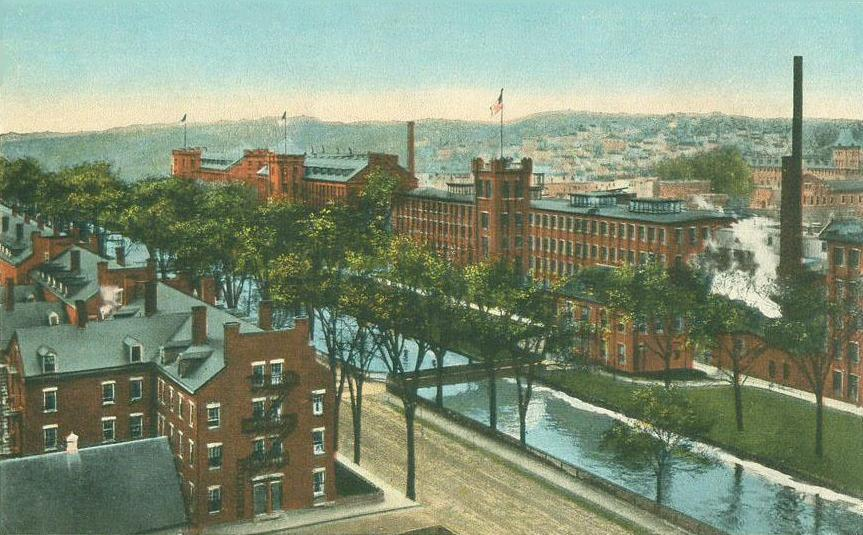
Bates Mill and canal c. 1915

At the start of the century, city leaders decided to build a cathedral to which the Roman Catholic Diocese of Portland could relocate. Construction of the Church of Saints Peter and Paul began in 1905 and ended in 1938, funded mostly through thousands of small donations from Lewiston residents. It is the largest Roman Catholic Church in Maine and the city's most prominent landmark.

In 1937, one of the largest labor disputes in Maine history occurred in Lewiston and Auburn, lasting from March to June and at its peak involved 4,000 to 5,000 workers. Governor Lewis Barrows sent in the Maine Army National Guard to quell the protestors. Some labor leaders, among them CIO Secretary Powers Hapgood, were imprisoned for months after the Maine Supreme Judicial Court issued an injunction seeking to end the strike. After World War I, profits from the textile industry in New England mill towns such as Lewiston began to decline. From the 1950s, Lewiston's textile mills began closing which led to widespread economic decline and emigration out of the city. The population began to slowly decline after 1970, decreasing at a greater rate in the 1990s.

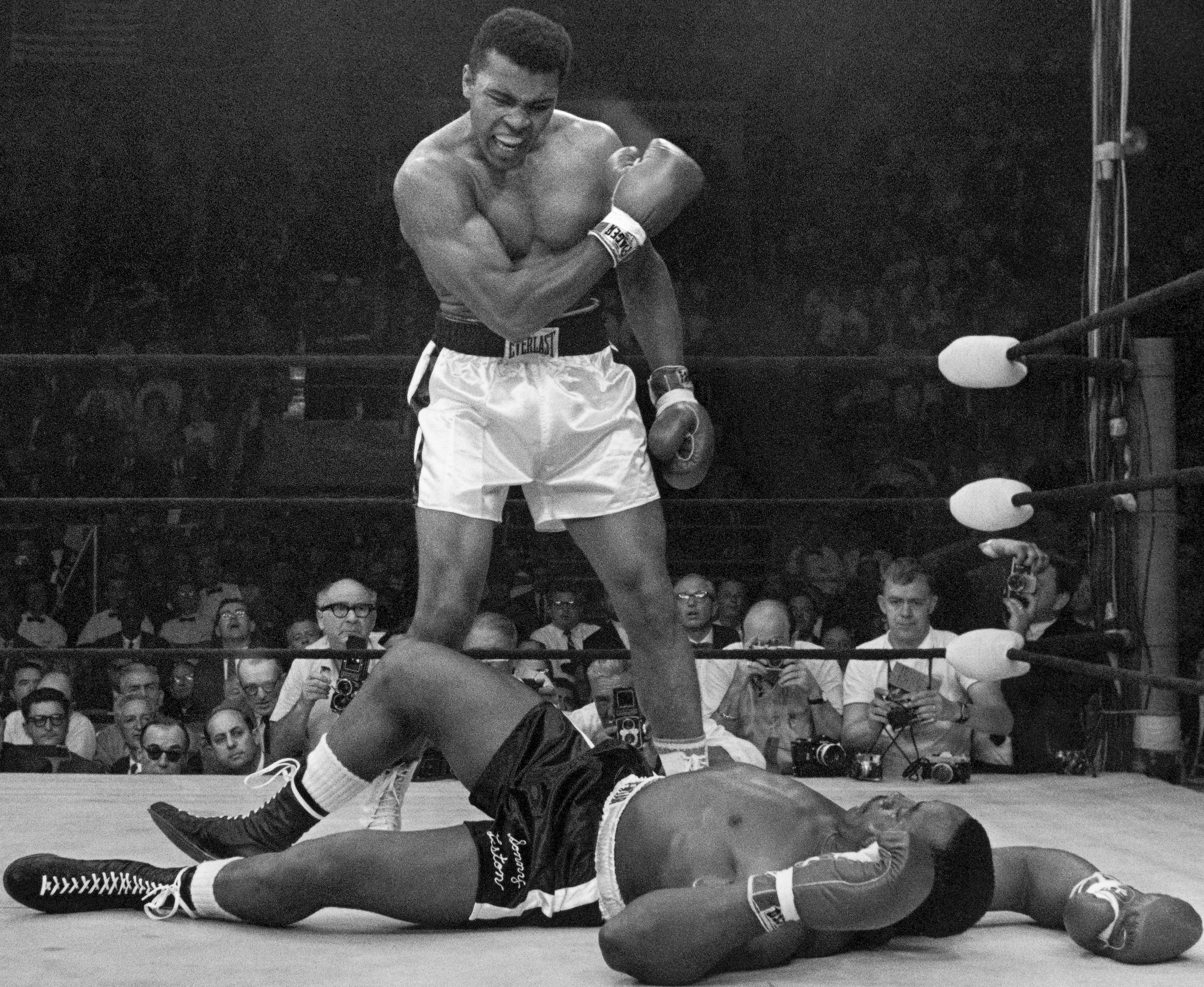
Muhammad Ali standing over Sonny Liston, 1965

In May 1965, Lewiston became the venue for a heavyweight title rematch between Muhammad Ali and Sonny Liston; Ali had defeated Liston in a controversial fight in Miami Beach, Florida, in February 1964, and the World Boxing Council was demanding an immediate rematch. Sixty years later, a statue of Ali would be unveiled in Lewiston to commemorate the match.

=== 21st century ===
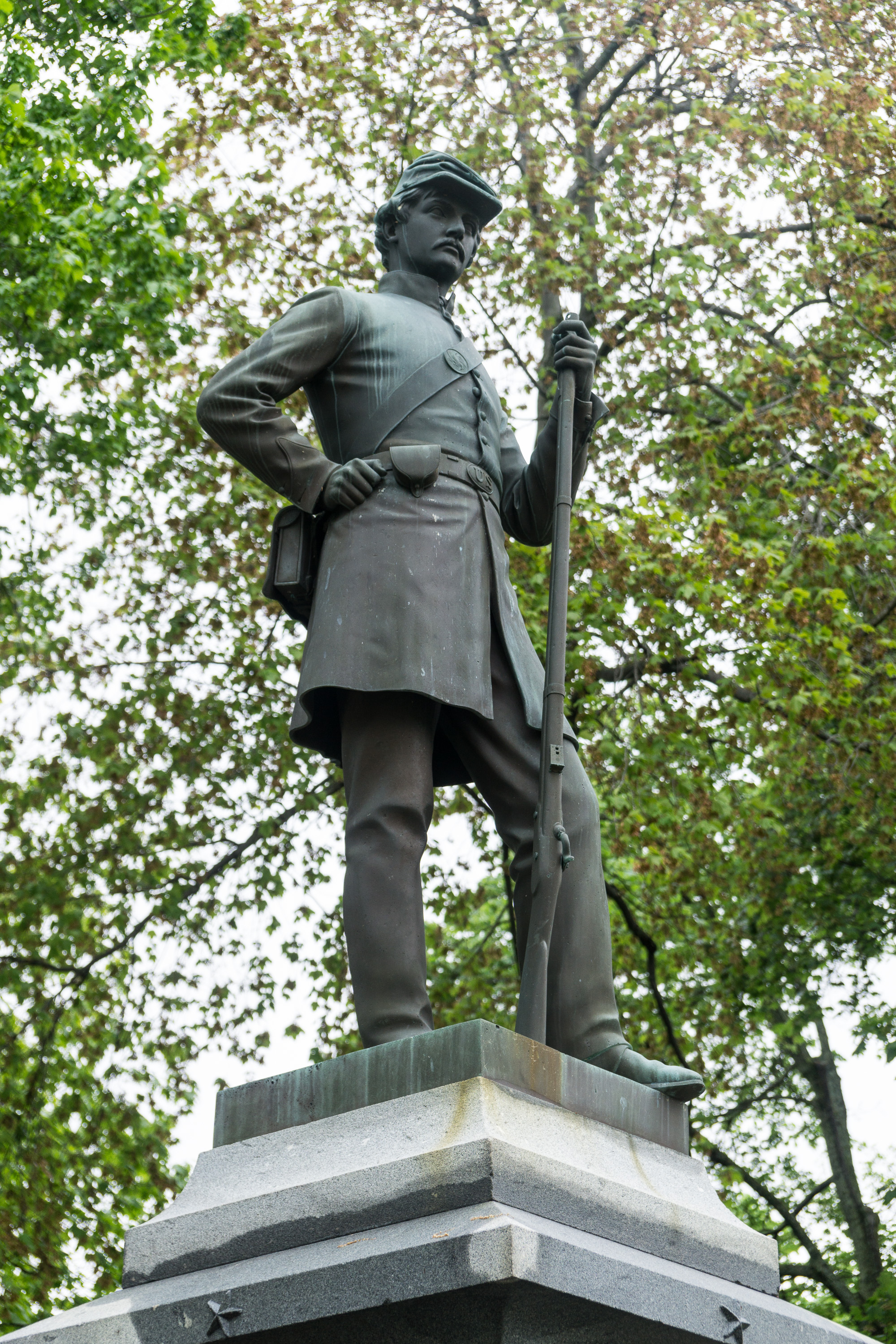
A Civil War memorial in Kennedy Park, 2017

Since the 2000s, the city has passed a variety of laws and economic initiatives aimed at urban renewal. Infrastructure development was announced in May 2004 with demolishing several blocks of 19th-century millworker housing using federal Community Development Block Grant funds. Lewiston earned a 2007 All-America City Award designation by the National Civic League.

During this time, Lewiston's affordable housing initiatives attracted refugees from Somalia migrating due to the Somali Civil War. From the mid-2000s onward, ethnic Somalis migrated to the former mill town, and after 2005, many Somali Bantus, a separate ethnicity, followed suit. This initially created social tension with city's existing population. In August 2010, the Lewiston Sun Journal reported that Somali entrepreneurs had helped reinvigorate downtown by opening shops in previously closed storefronts.

In October 2023, on the outskirts of Lewiston, a spree shooting occurred at two locations where 18 people were killed, and 13 others were injured, in what would become the deadliest shooting spree in Maine history. In January 2026, U.S. federal agencies, including immigration enforcement (ICE), carried out raids within the city's Somali population. In line with broader federal raids against Somalis in Maine, the economy of Lewiston was negatively impacted. As a sanctuary city, protests against ICE from Lewiston residents followed.

== Geography ==
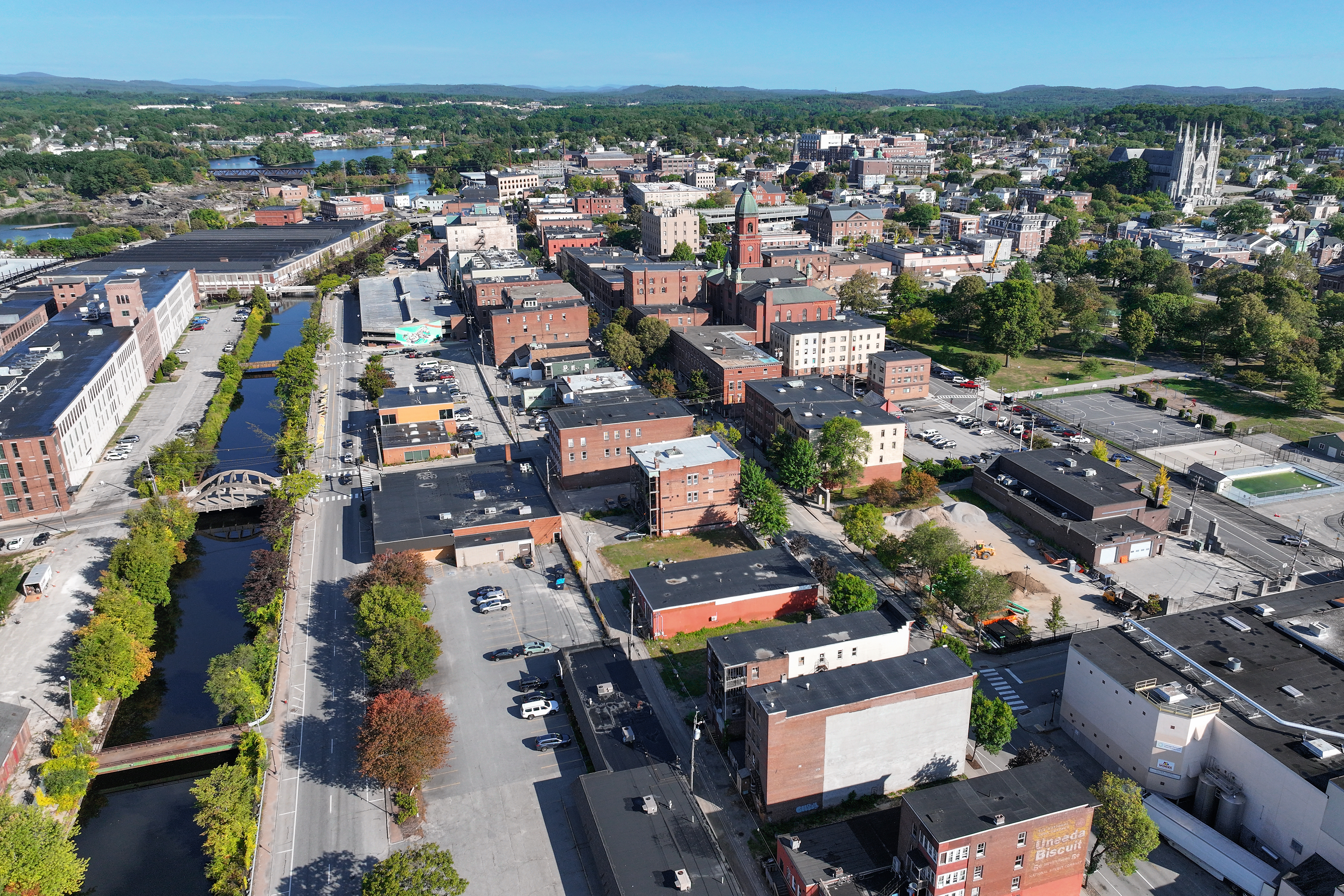
Downtown Lewiston, 2025

According to the United States Census Bureau, the city has a total area of 35.54 square miles (92.05 km^{2}), of which 34.15 square miles (88.45 km^{2}) is land and 1.39 square miles (3.60 km^{2}) is water. Lewiston is drained by the Androscoggin River, which forms its western border. The city is bordered by Auburn beyond the river, as well as the towns of Greene, Sabattus, and Lisbon. It is halfway between Portland, the state's largest city and cultural center, and the state capital of Augusta.

=== Climate ===
Lewiston has a humid continental climate, with very significant temperature variation throughout the year. Summers are usually short, warm, and humid, while winters tend to be very cold, long, and snowy. Lewiston averages 74 inches (190 cm) of snow annually, although this number varies greatly from winter to winter. Snow tends to be the dominant form of precipitation between late November and late March, although freezing rain, sleet, and rain can also occur in the winter when large low pressure systems track directly over or west of the city. Summer in Lewiston typically consists of pleasant temperatures, although high humidity can make the temperature feel more uncomfortable at times. Severe summertime storms, such as tornadoes and tropical cyclones are rare.

Climate data for Lewiston, Maine (1991–2020 normals, extremes 1893–2006)
Month	Jan	Feb	Mar	Apr	May	Jun	Jul	Aug	Sep	Oct	Nov	Dec	Year
Record high °F (°C)	64 (18)	65 (18)	85 (29)	91 (33)	101 (38)	99 (37)	102 (39)	100 (38)	97 (36)	90 (32)	75 (24)	67 (19)	102 (39)
Mean daily maximum °F (°C)	28.4 (−2.0)	31.6 (−0.2)	40.3 (4.6)	52.9 (11.6)	65.3 (18.5)	74.1 (23.4)	79.9 (26.6)	79.2 (26.2)	70.3 (21.3)	57.6 (14.2)	45.0 (7.2)	34.2 (1.2)	54.9 (12.7)
Daily mean °F (°C)	20.0 (−6.7)	22.6 (−5.2)	31.4 (−0.3)	43.9 (6.6)	55.6 (13.1)	64.9 (18.3)	70.8 (21.6)	69.8 (21.0)	61.3 (16.3)	49.4 (9.7)	38.2 (3.4)	27.3 (−2.6)	46.3 (7.9)
Mean daily minimum °F (°C)	11.6 (−11.3)	13.7 (−10.2)	22.6 (−5.2)	34.8 (1.6)	46.0 (7.8)	55.8 (13.2)	61.8 (16.6)	60.4 (15.8)	52.2 (11.2)	41.2 (5.1)	31.4 (−0.3)	20.4 (−6.4)	37.7 (3.2)
Record low °F (°C)	−28 (−33)	−28 (−33)	−18 (−28)	5 (−15)	26 (−3)	34 (1)	44 (7)	37 (3)	28 (−2)	20 (−7)	2 (−17)	−27 (−33)	−28 (−33)
Average precipitation inches (mm)	3.28 (83)	3.24 (82)	3.53 (90)	4.04 (103)	3.18 (81)	4.28 (109)	3.51 (89)	3.36 (85)	3.74 (95)	4.90 (124)	3.94 (100)	4.18 (106)	45.18 (1,148)
Average snowfall inches (cm)	19.4 (49)	17.3 (44)	12.3 (31)	2.9 (7.4)	0.0 (0.0)	0.0 (0.0)	0.0 (0.0)	0.0 (0.0)	0.0 (0.0)	0.0 (0.0)	1.6 (4.1)	11.6 (29)	65.1 (165)
Average precipitation days (≥ 0.01 in)	10.0	8.2	10.3	9.9	11.5	11.5	10.7	9.8	8.7	9.4	9.3	10.9	120.2
Average snowy days (≥ 0.1 in)	6.4	5.7	4.6	0.8	0.1	0.0	0.0	0.0	0.0	0.0	0.9	5.0	23.4
Source: NOAA

== Demographics ==
Historical population
Census	Pop.	Note	%±
1790	532		—
1800	948		78.2%
1810	1,038		9.5%
1820	1,312		26.4%
1830	1,549		18.1%
1840	1,801		16.3%
1850	3,584		99.0%
1860	7,424		107.1%
1870	13,600		83.2%
1880	19,083		40.3%
1890	21,701		13.7%
1900	23,761		9.5%
1910	26,247		10.5%
1920	31,791		21.1%
1930	34,948		9.9%
1940	38,598		10.4%
1950	40,974		6.2%
1960	40,804		−0.4%
1970	41,779		2.4%
1980	40,481		−3.1%
1990	39,757		−1.8%
2000	35,690		−10.2%
2010	36,592		2.5%
2020	37,121		1.4%
2025 (est.)	38,866		4.7%

=== Racial and ethnic composition ===
Lewiston city, Maine – racial and ethnic composition Note: the US Census treats Hispanic/Latino as an ethnic category. This table excludes Latinos from the racial categories and assigns them to a separate category. Hispanics/Latinos may be of any race.
Race / ethnicity (NH = non-Hispanic)	Pop 2000	Pop 2010	Pop 2020	% 2000	% 2010	% 2020
White alone (NH)	33,896	31,273	28,621	94.97%	85.46%	77.10%
Black or African American alone (NH)	361	3,129	5,108	1.01%	8.55%	13.76%
Native American or Alaska Native alone (NH)	100	141	143	0.28%	0.39%	0.39%
Asian alone (NH)	299	384	431	0.84%	1.05%	1.16%
Native Hawaiian or Pacific Islander alone (NH)	10	14	27	0.03%	0.04%	0.07%
Other race alone (NH)	30	53	173	0.08%	0.14%	0.47%
Mixed race or multiracial (NH)	546	868	1,700	1.53%	2.37%	4.58%
Hispanic or Latino (any race)	448	730	918	1.26%	1.99%	2.47%
Total	35,690	36,592	37,121	100.00%	100.00%	100.00%

=== 2020 census ===
As of the 2020 census, Lewiston had a population of 37,121. The median age was 37.9 years. 21.4% of residents were under the age of 18 and 17.5% of residents were 65 years of age or older.

For every 100 females there were 94.5 males, and for every 100 females age 18 and over there were 92.9 males age 18 and over.

There were 15,285 households in Lewiston, of which 25.5% had children under the age of 18 living in them. Of all households, 35.2% were married-couple households, 22.7% were households with a male householder and no spouse or partner present, and 32.1% were households with a female householder and no spouse or partner present. About 36.2% of all households were made up of individuals and 14.1% had someone living alone who was 65 years of age or older.

There were 16,579 housing units, of which 7.8% were vacant. The homeowner vacancy rate was 1.1% and the rental vacancy rate was 7.2%.

87.0% of residents lived in urban areas, while 13.0% lived in rural areas.

Racial composition as of the 2020 census
Race	Number	Percent
White	28,930	77.9%
Black or African American	5,166	13.9%
American Indian and Alaska Native	159	0.4%
Asian	439	1.2%
Native Hawaiian and Other Pacific Islander	30	0.1%
Some other race	368	1.0%
Two or more races	2,029	5.5%

The most reported ancestries in 2020 were:

- French (18.7%)
- English (16.7%)
- Irish (11.1%)
- Somali (4.6%)
- German (4.4%)
- African American (3.2%)
- Italian (3.2%)
- Scottish (3.1%)
- French Canadian (3%)
- Polish (1.2%)

=== 2010 census ===
At the 2010 census, there were 36,592 people, 15,267 households, and 8,622 families residing in the city. The population density was 1,071.5 inhabitants per square mile (413.7/km^{2}). There were 16,731 housing units at an average density of 489.9 per square mile (189.2/km^{2}).

The racial makeup of the city was 86.6% White, 8.7% Black, 0.4% American Indian and Alaska Native, 1.0% Asian, 2.0% Hispanic or Latino (of any race), 0.6% from some other race, and 2.6% from two or more races.

In 2010, there were 15,267 households, of which 27.5% had children under the age of 18 living with them, 37.5% were married couples living together, 13.7% had a female householder with no husband present, 5.2% had a male householder with no wife present, and 43.5% were non-families. Of all households, 34.4% were made up of individuals, and 12.5% had someone living alone who was 65 years of age or older. The average household size was 2.26 and the average family size was 2.90.

The median age in the city was 37.4 years. 22.1% of residents were under the age of 18; 12.9% were between the ages of 18 and 24; 24.1% were from 25 to 44; 25.3% were from 45 to 64; and 15.5% were 65 years of age or older. The gender makeup of the city was 48.1% male and 51.9% female.

=== Native language ===
Saints Peter and Paul Basilica, the only one in Maine, in Lewiston, 2017

Survey Year 2000 Source:

Language	Population	Percentage (%)
English	24,250	72.51%
French	8,620	25.77%
Spanish	280	0.83%
Other languages	293	0.88%

=== Voter registration ===
Voter Registration as of January 2015
Party	Total Voters	Percentage
Democratic	10,400	42.11%
Unregistered	8,636	34.97%
Republican	4,307	17.44%
Green Independent	1,351	5.47%
Total	24,694	100%

== Politics ==
Lewiston city vote by party in presidential elections
Year	Democratic	Republican	Third Parties
2024	52.90% 8,791	44.73% 7,433	2.37% 394
2020	55.30% 9,616	41.59% 7,232	3.11% 540
2016	48.96% 8,222	43.69% 7,336	7.35% 1,185
2012	60.61% 9,624	36.50% 5,796	2.89% 459
2008	62.84% 10,629	35.24% 5,961	1.92% 324
2004	61.73% 11,021	36.53% 6,523	1.74% 311

== Economy ==
The economy of Lewiston is diversified with a historic focus on manufacturing. Since the 2000s, it has undergone economic modernization with a focus on healthcare, education, financial services as well as warehousing distribution. In 2023, the city received $30 million from the federal government to expand investable property development.

=== Top employers ===
According to Lewiston's 2022 Annual Comprehensive Financial Report, the top employers in the city were:

#	Employer	# of Employees
1	Central Maine Medical Center	2,135
2	Sisters of Charity Health Systems	1,169
3	TD Bank	989
4	Bates College	947
5	Walmart	622
6	McKesson	380
7	Flowers Foods	375
8	Sazerac/Boston Brands of Maine	279
9	Androscoggin Home Health	273
10	State of Maine	250

== Arts and culture ==
=== Library ===
- The Lewiston Public Library has played a major role in the emerging culture of Lewiston. It was renovated and expanded in 1996. The library is downtown on the corner of Lisbon Street and Pine Street and has over 150,000 items in its collection.

=== Museums ===
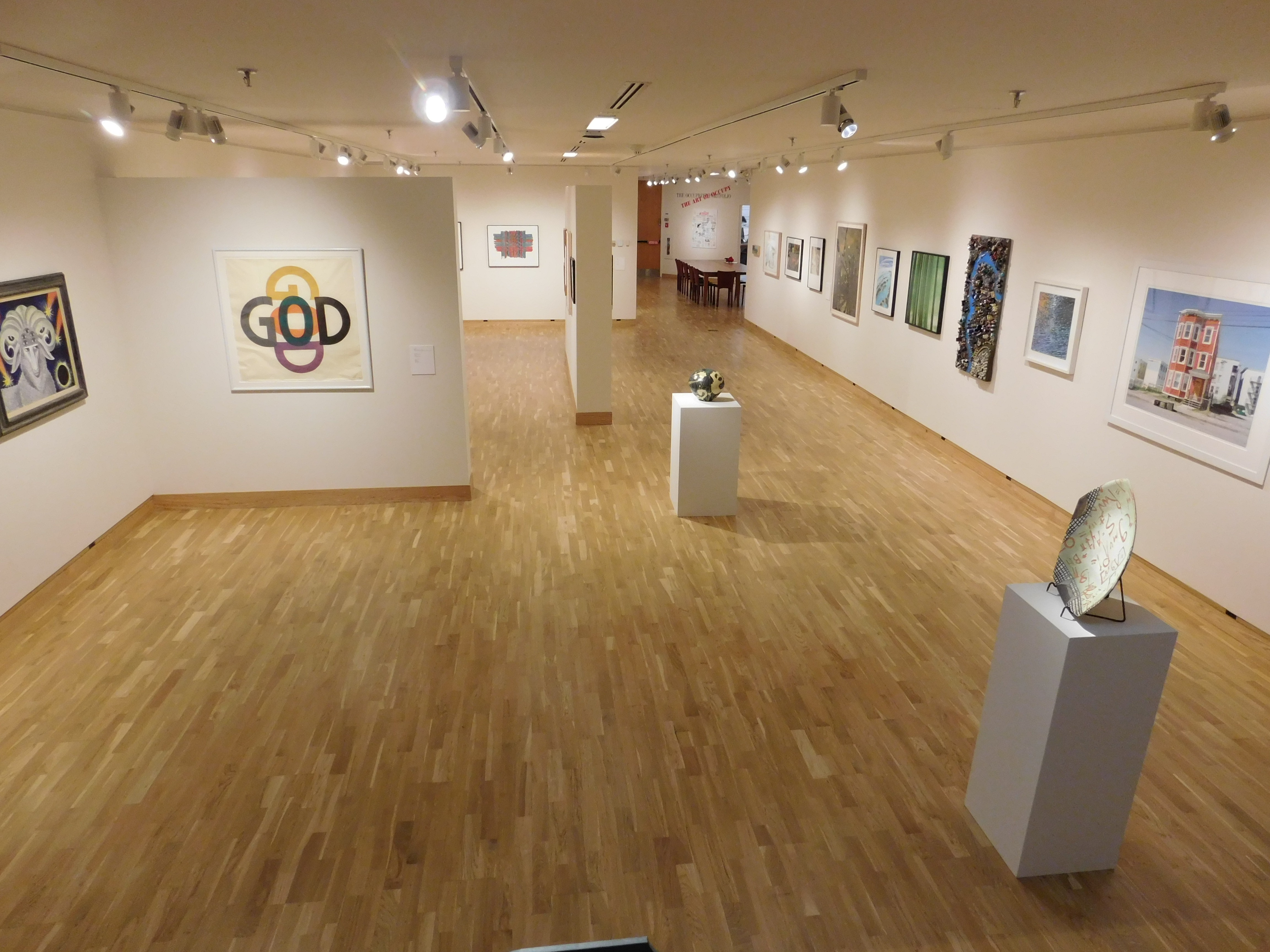
Bates College Museum of Art, 2015

- Maine Museum of Innovation, Learning and Labor (MILL): is a museum set in a former textile factory building. Visitors can walk through a simulated production line, then view exhibits covering the textile, shoe, and brick industries that once thrived in Lewiston and Auburn.
- The Bates College Museum of Art features a wide variety of art, though, as of April 2026, none of the permanent collection of c. 8,000 items is on display.
- The Atrium Gallery: at the University of Southern Maine campus in Lewiston.

=== The Franco Center ===
The Franco Center opened in 2000 to host events and serves as a museum of the city's French American past with historical artifacts and documentation on display as well as a small library.

=== The Public Theatre ===
Lewiston features The Public Theatre, which puts on different plays throughout the year with about six to eight productions per season.

== Sports and recreation ==
=== Androscoggin Bank Colisée ===
The center of sports in Lewiston is the Androscoggin Bank Colisée. The Colisée is home to the state high school hockey championships each year. The junior Maine Nordiques of the North American Hockey League have played their home games at the Colisée since 2019.

=== Lewiston Twins (1891–1930) ===
Lewiston was home to minor league baseball. Beginning in 1891, Lewiston was home to the Lewiston Twins and other teams, who played in various seasons through 1930. Lewiston teams played as members of the New England League (1891–1896, 1901), Maine State League (1907), Atlantic Association (1908) and New England League (1914–1915, 1919, 1926–1930). Baseball Hall of Fame member Jesse Burkett managed the Lewiston Twins in 1928 and 1929. Between 1901 and 1919, Lewiston teams played home games at A.A.A. Park. Beginning in 1926, the Lewiston Twins played home games at Lewiston Athletic Park.

=== Maine Nordiques (1973–1977) ===
The Maine Nordiques were a professional hockey team that operated in the former North American Hockey League from 1973 to 1977. They were based at the Central Maine Youth Center in Lewiston. The Nordiques served as a farm club for the Quebec Nordiques of the World Hockey Association.

=== Maine Nordiques (2019–present) ===
The Maine Nordiques are a Tier II junior ice hockey team in the North American Hockey League's East Division. They started play during the 2019–2020 season at the Androscoggin Bank Colisée. The team is coached by Nolan Howe, grandson of Gordie Howe and son of Mark Howe.

== Education ==
Lewiston's public education system consists of five elementary schools, one middle school, and one high school with a regional technical center that serves multiple school districts. In 2019, Martel and Longley combined into Robert V. Connors Elementary School.

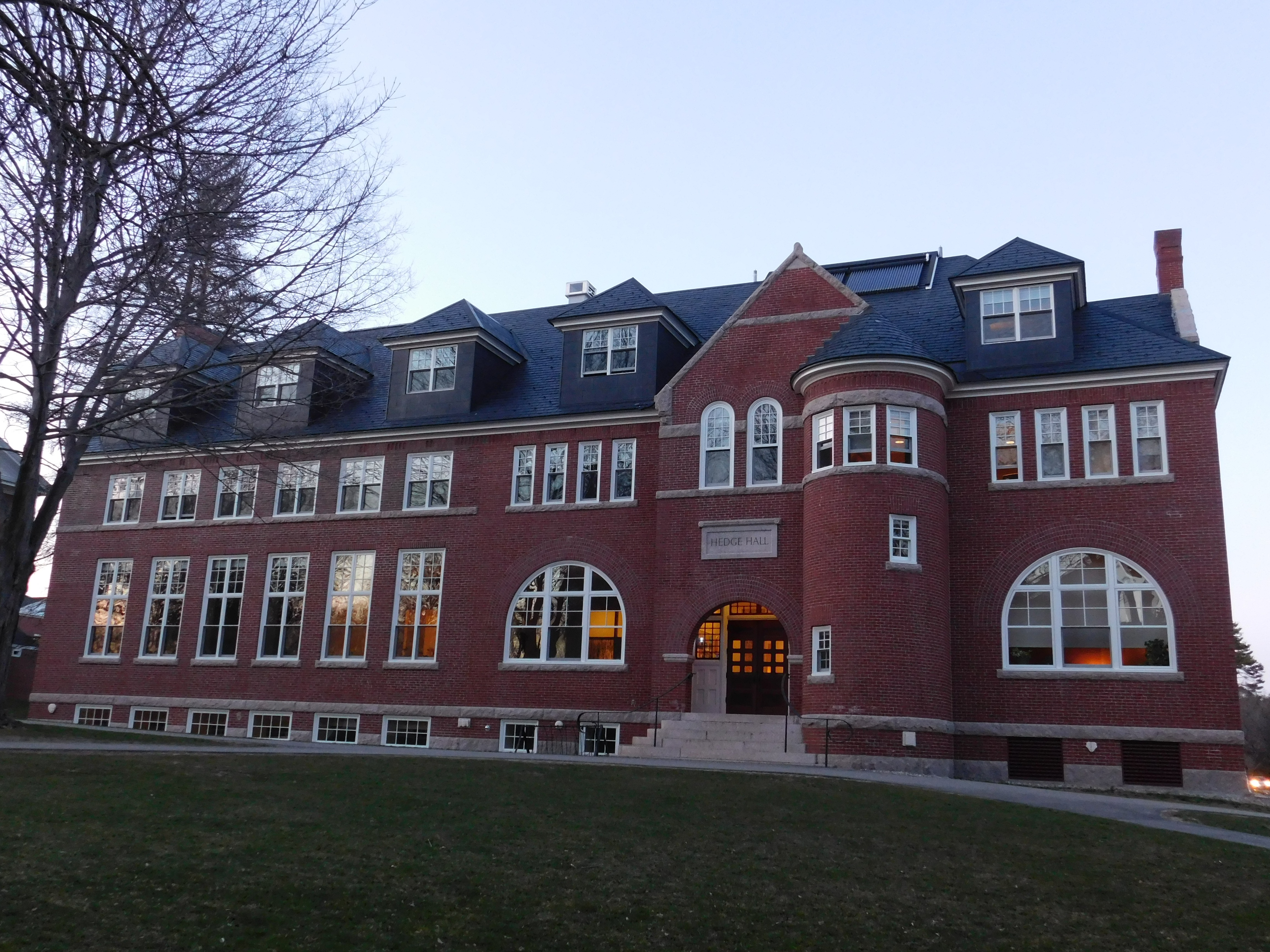
The campus of Bates College in 2017

=== Colleges and universities ===
- Bates College
- Maine College of Health Professions
- University of Southern Maine (Lewiston/Auburn campus)
- Central Maine Community College (Auburn)

=== Public schools ===
Lewiston Public Schools operates eight public schools:

- Lewiston High School (9–12) 1,446 students
- Lewiston Regional Technical Center (9–12)
- Lewiston Middle School (7–8)
- Farwell Elementary School (K–6)
- Raymond A Geiger Elementary School (K–6)
- Robert V. Connors Elementary School (K–6)
- Montello School (K–6)
- Thomas J McMahon Elementary School (K–6)

=== Private schools ===
- The Discovery School (PK-12)
- Saint-Dominic Academy (Lewiston campus)
- Vineyard Christian School (PK-12)

=== Charter Schools ===
- Acadia Academy (PK-6)

== Media ==
=== Newspapers ===
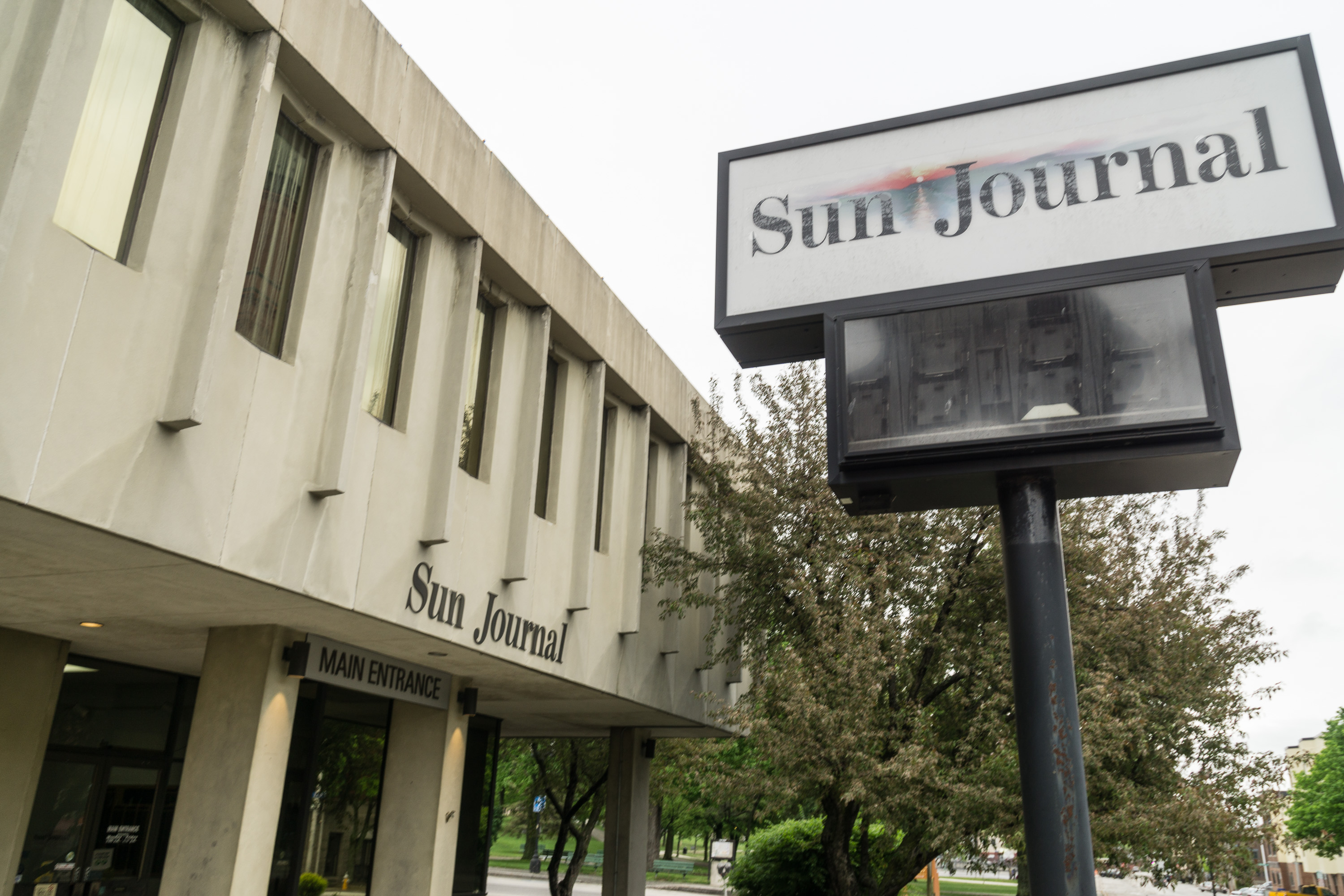
The Lewiston Sun Journal, 2017

- The Sun Journal prints a daily newspaper in four different editions statewide.
- The Twin City Times is a free weekly newspaper printed in Auburn.

=== Radio ===
Five radio stations are licensed to serve the city:

- WARX/93.9, airing a non-commercial religious format. It is the former sister station of WCOU, now WIGY.
- WIGY/1240, airing an adult contemporary format simulcasting WEZR.
- WFNK 107.5, which is branded as 107.5 Frank FM and airs a classic hits format that is targeted primarily at Portland area listeners.
- WLAM 1470, which airs a standards format branded as The Memories Station.
- WRBC 91.5, which is the college radio station of Bates College.

== Transportation ==
=== Public transportation ===
The city of Lewiston uses the Citylink or Purple Bus system in collaboration with Auburn and Lisbon. The downtown shuttle runs through the downtown of both Lewiston and Auburn. It maintains only one line that goes into Lisbon. The Citylink services on average approximately 235,000 people a year.

==== Roadways and major routes ====
- Interstate 95 / Maine Turnpike: Formerly Interstate 495, runs through Lewiston. Exit 80 serves the city via Alfred Plourde Parkway in the Industrial Park. I-95 provides a connection to Portland being 40 minutes away, Bangor about 90 minutes away, and Boston, about two hours away from the Lewiston Exit.
- U.S. Route 202 / Maine State Routes 11 and 100: These three routes run through Lewiston along Main Street. It runs straight through the center of downtown to the business parks outside town, and the northern Lewiston suburbs. Connects Lewiston to Auburn and Greene. Provides fast transportation to Augusta and Kennebec Valley.
- Maine State Route 196: Starts in Lewiston at U.S. Route 202, Main Street. In Lewiston it is Canal Street, which turns into Lisbon Street. This route connects Lewiston to Lisbon, and provides easy access to the towns of Topsham and Brunswick. This route ends on U.S. Route 1 in the City of Brunswick. It connects to Interstate 295 in Topsham.
- Maine State Route 126: Starts in Lewiston at US Route 202, Main Street. In Lewiston it is Sabattus Street and connects Lewiston to the town of Sabattus.

==== Airports and bus station ====
- Auburn/Lewiston Municipal Airport: The official airport of the two cities. It currently provides general aviation facilities. Although the city is serviced by an airport, most people use the Portland International Jetport for commercial flights in and out of the state.

== National Register of Historic Places ==
- Androscoggin Mill Block
- Atkinson Building
- Bergin Block
- Bradford House
- Captain Holland House
- College Block-Lisbon Block
- Continental Mill Housing
- Cowan Mill
- Dominican Block
- Dr. Louis J. Martel House
- Dr. Milton Wedgewood House
- First Callahan Building
- First McGillicuddy Block
- First National Bank
- Grand Trunk Railroad Station
- Hathorn Hall, Bates College
- Healey Asylum
- Holland-Drew House
- James C. Lord House
- John D. Clifford House
- Jordan School
- Kora Temple
- Lewiston City Hall
- Lewiston Public Library
- Lewiston Trust and Safe Deposit Company
- Lord Block
- Lower Lisbon Street Historic District
- Lyceum Hall
- Maine Supply Company Building
- Manufacturer's National Bank
- Marcotte Nursing Home
- Oak Street School
- Odd Fellows Block
- Osgood Building
- Pilsbury Block
- Philip M. and Deborah N. Isaacson House
- Saint Mary's General Hospital
- Savings Bank Block
- Second Callahan Block
- Sen. William P. Frye House
- St. Joseph's Catholic Church
- Basilica of Saints Peter and Paul
- Trinity Episcopal Church
- U.S. Post Office – Lewiston Main
- Union Block

== See also ==
- History of Maine
- History of Portland, Maine
