= Harry S. Coombs =

American architect (1878–1939)

Harry Stevens Coombs
- Born: October 27, 1878; Lewiston, Maine
- Died: May 17, 1939 (aged 60); Lewiston, Maine
- Occupation: Architect
- Buildings: Central Maine General Hospital, Rumford Municipal Building, Hotel Herbert, Stearns High School, Lewiston High School, Togus VA Hospital, Brunswick High School

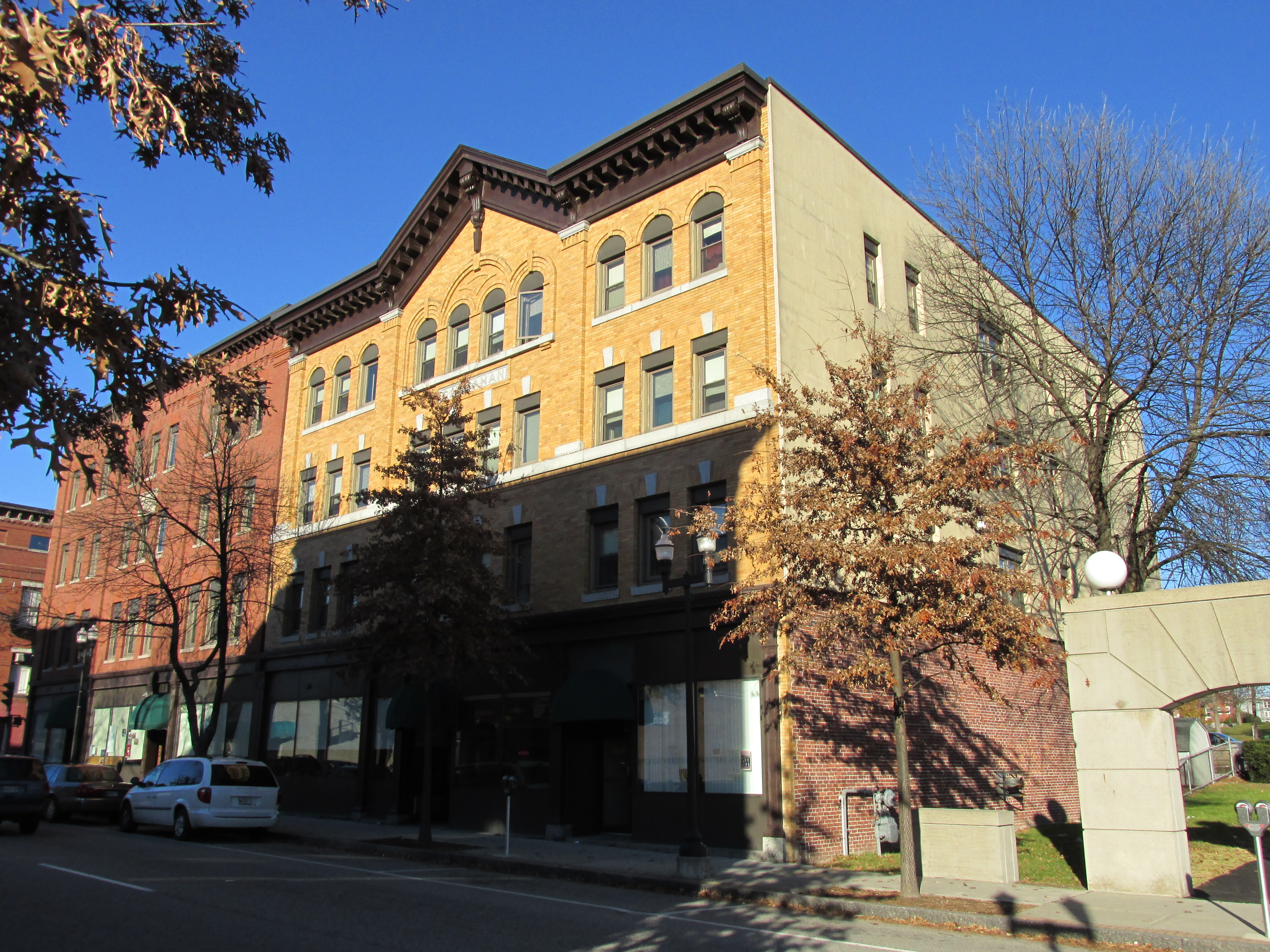
Callahan Block, Lewiston, 1910.

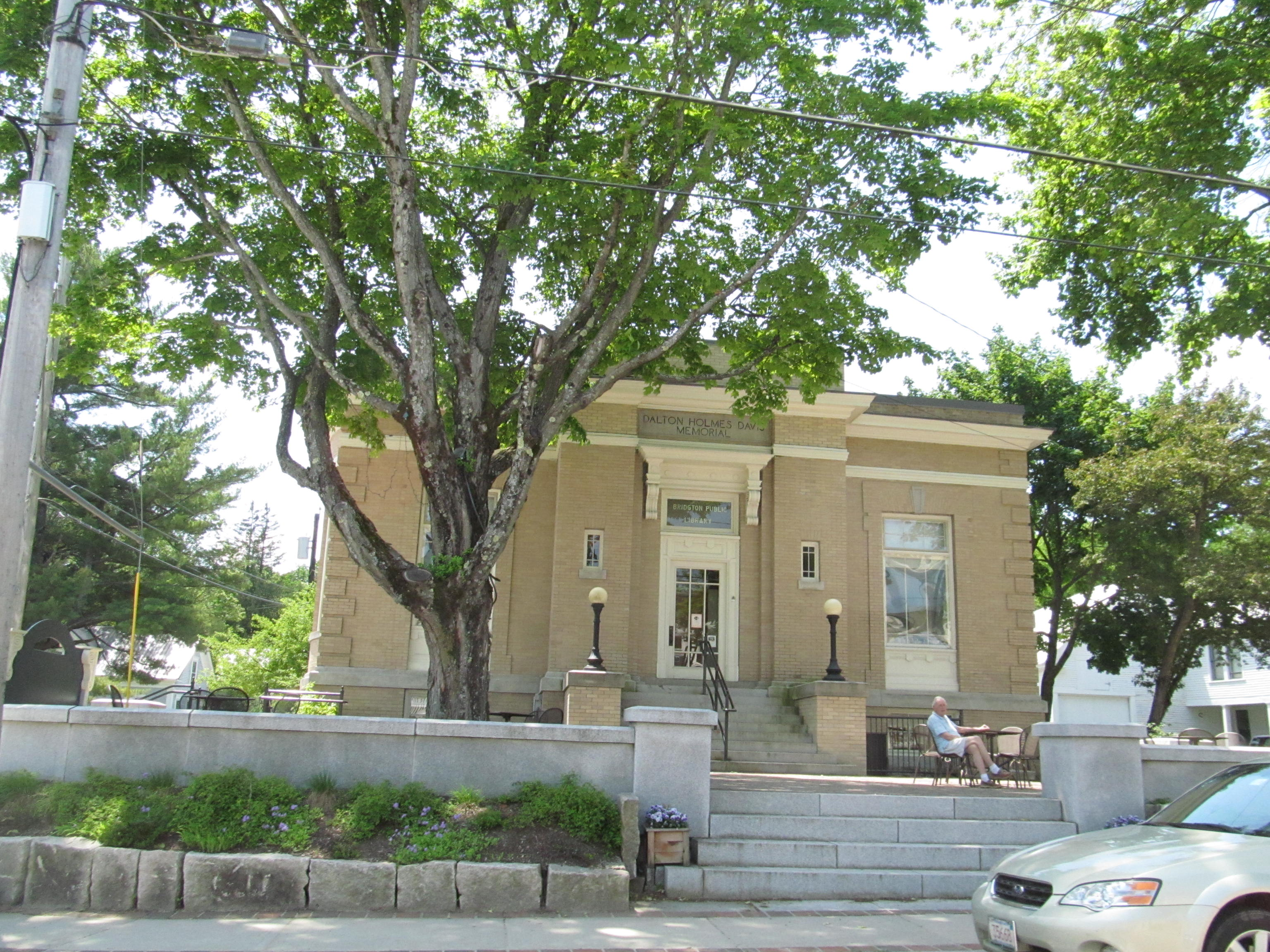
Davis Memorial Library, Bridgton, 1912.

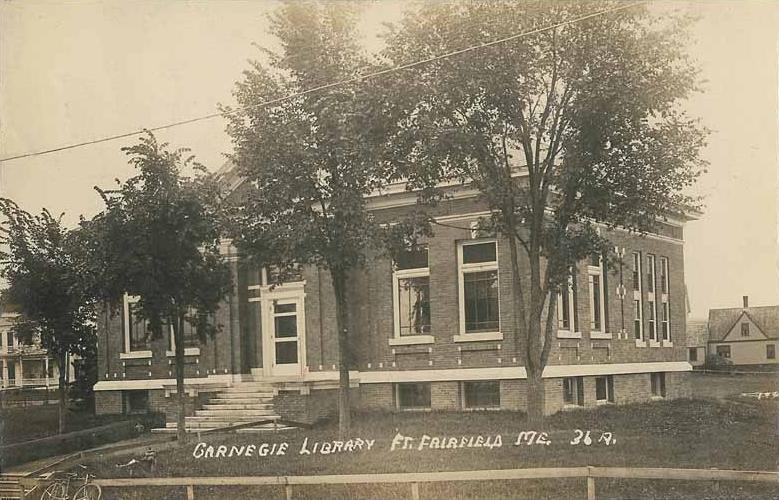
Public Library, Fort Fairfield, 1912.

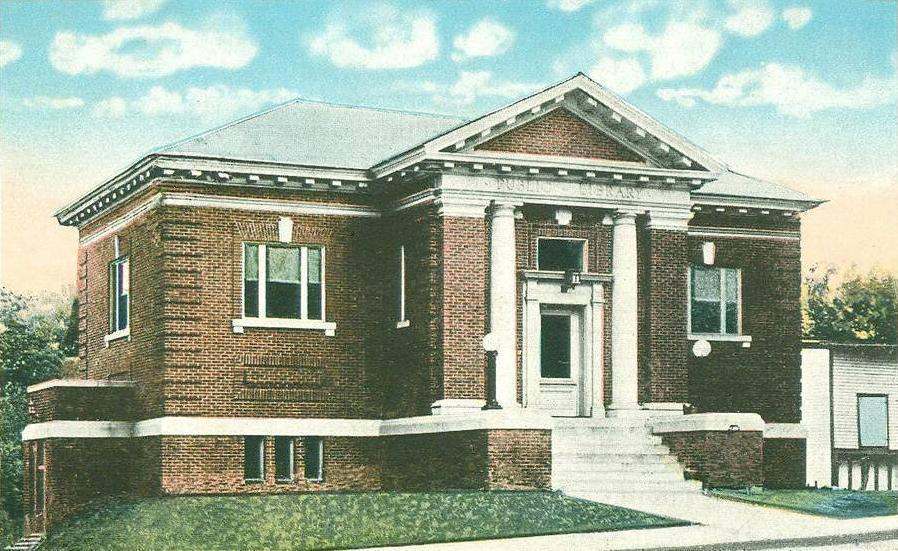
Public Library, Oakland, 1914.

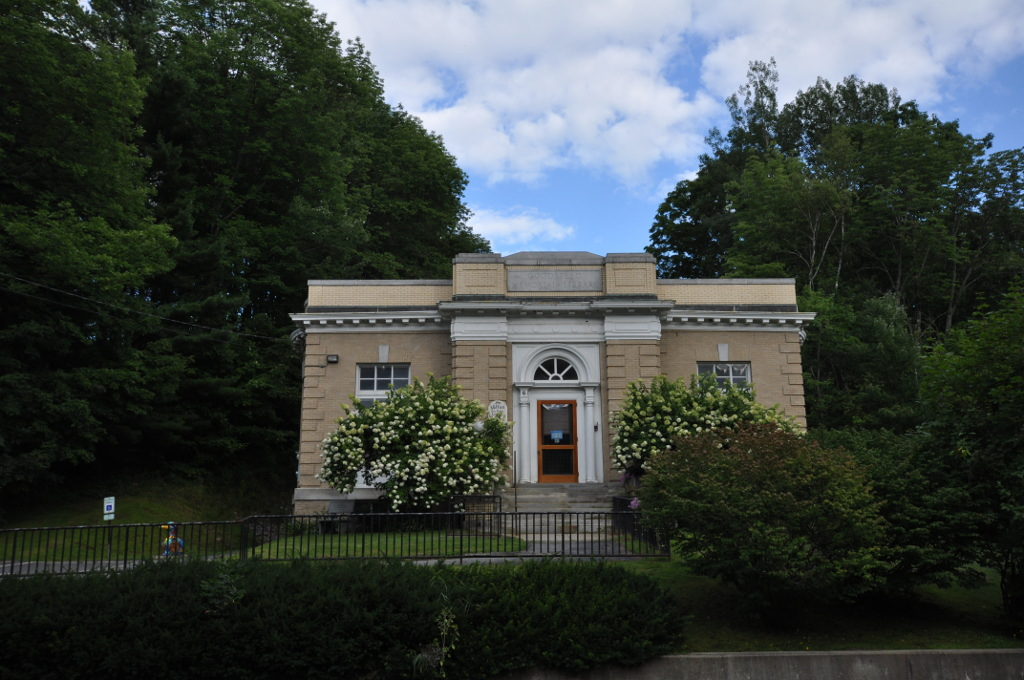
Goodspeed Memorial Library, Wilton, 1915.

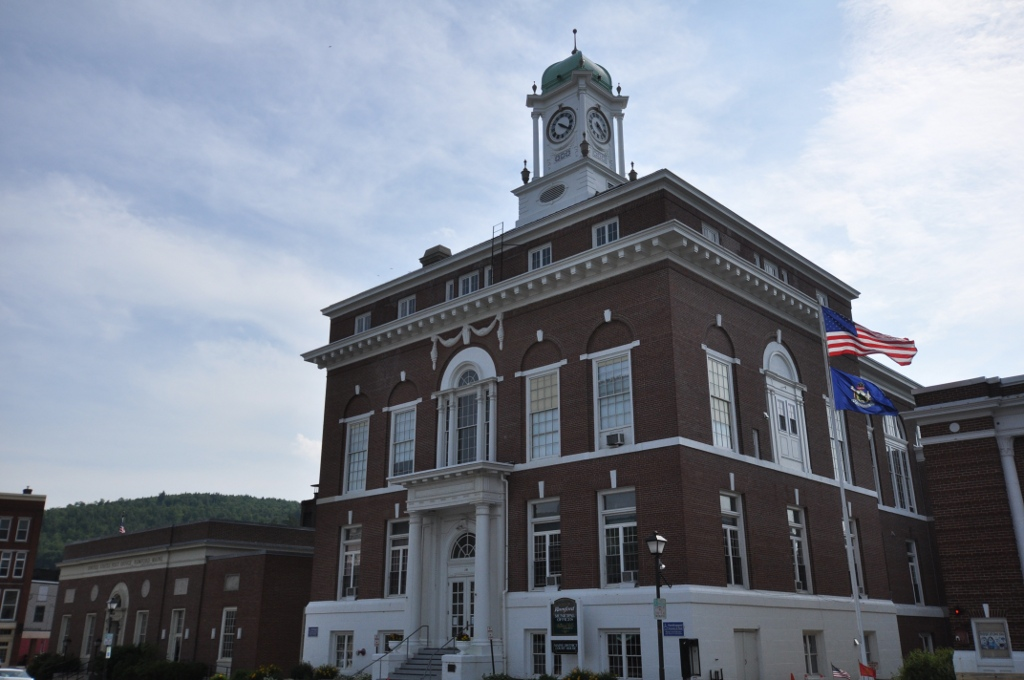
Municipal Building, Rumford, 1915.

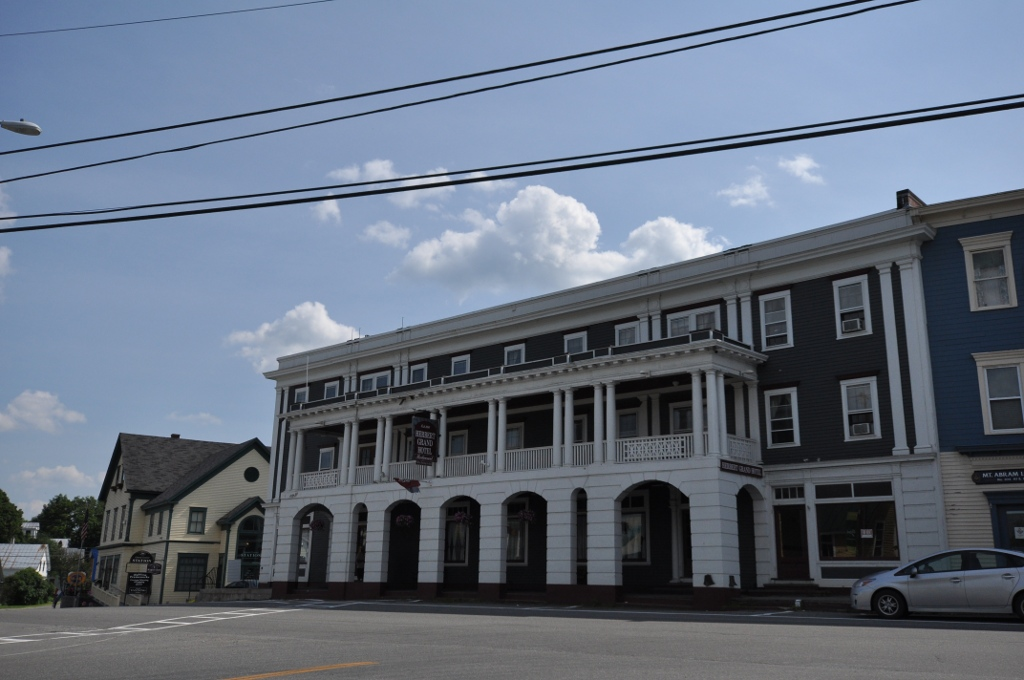
Hotel Herbert, Kingfield, 1917.

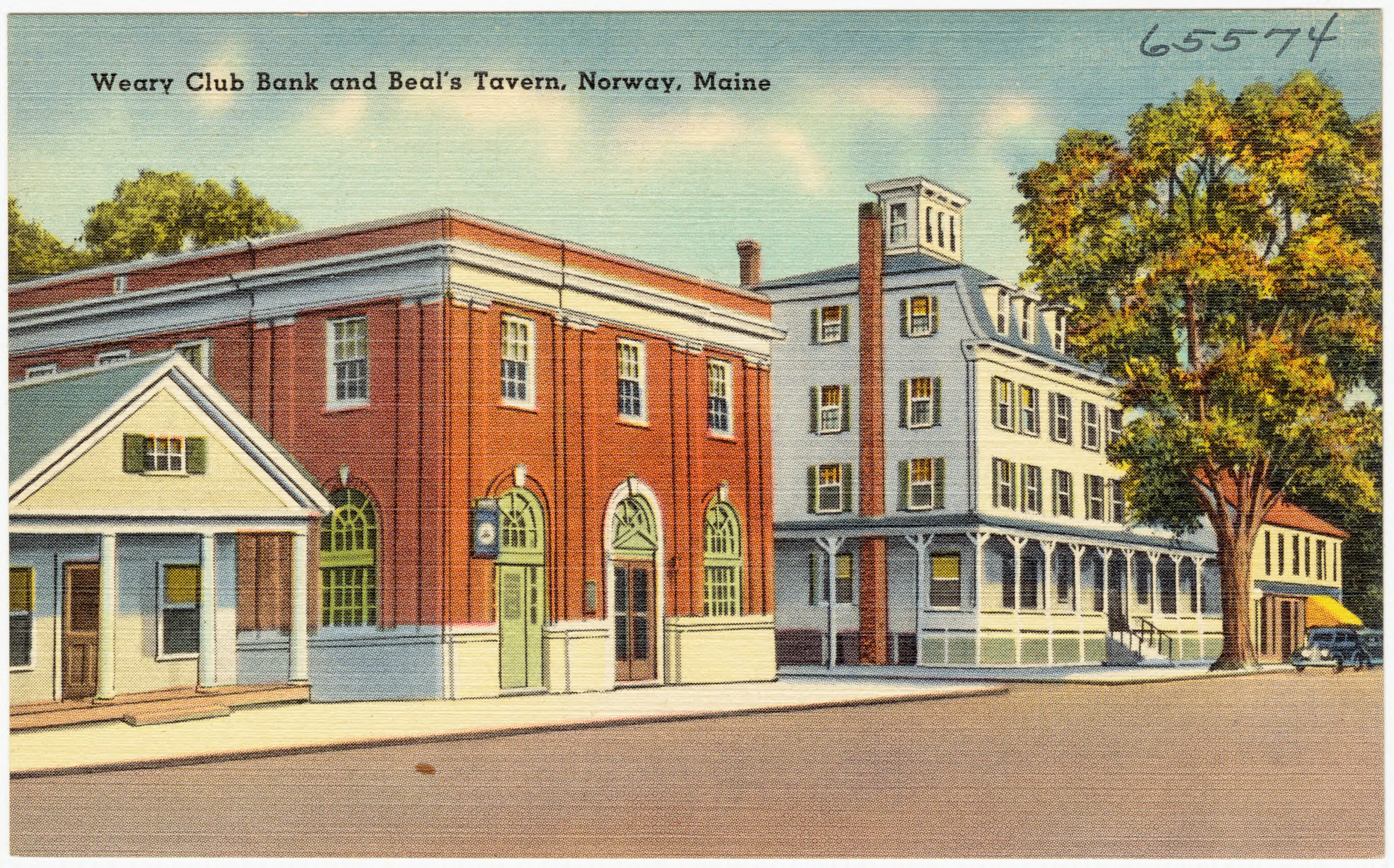
National Bank Building, Norway, 1926.

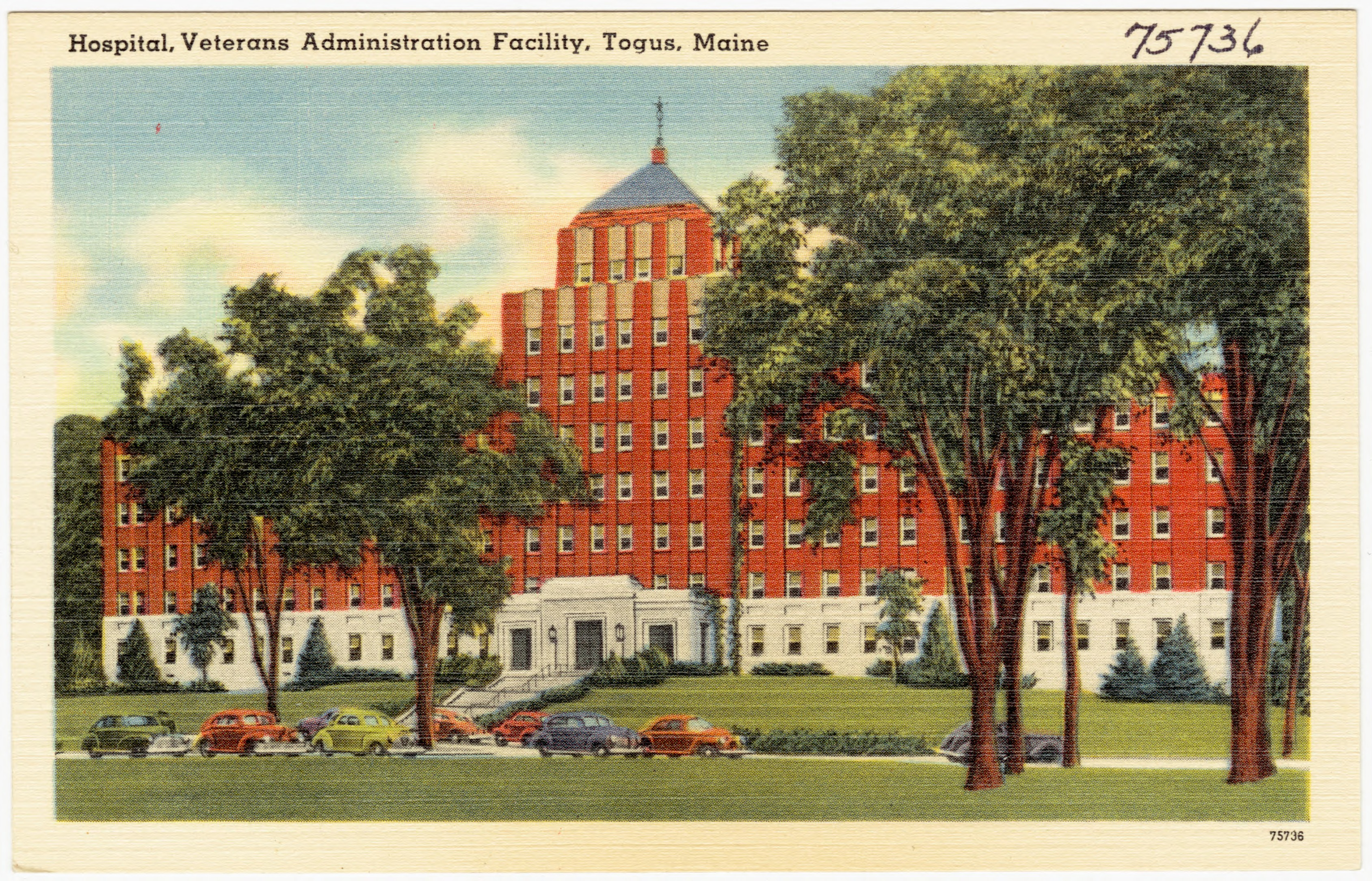
Togus VA Hospital, Chelsea, 1932.

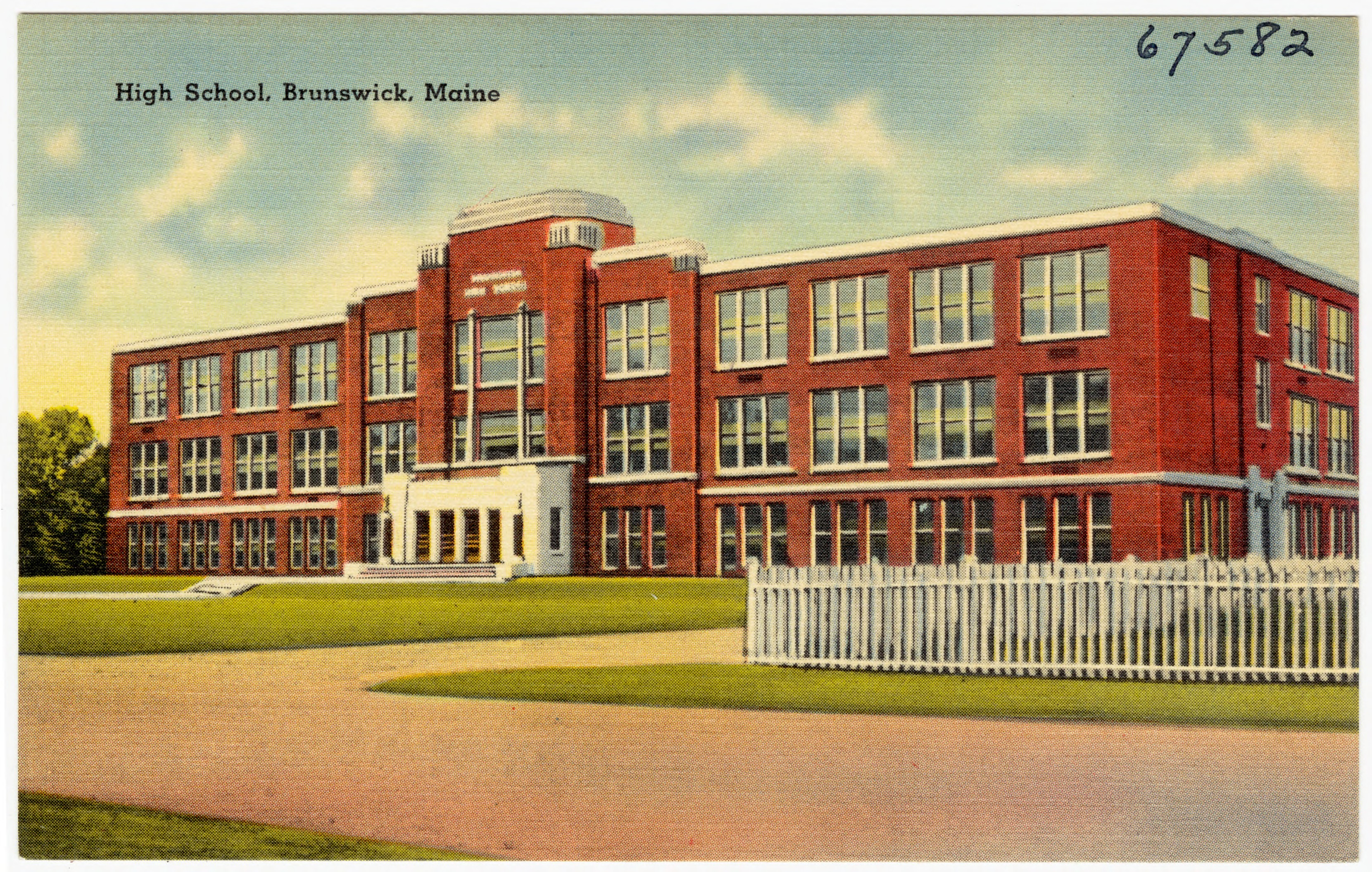
High School, Brunswick, 1936.

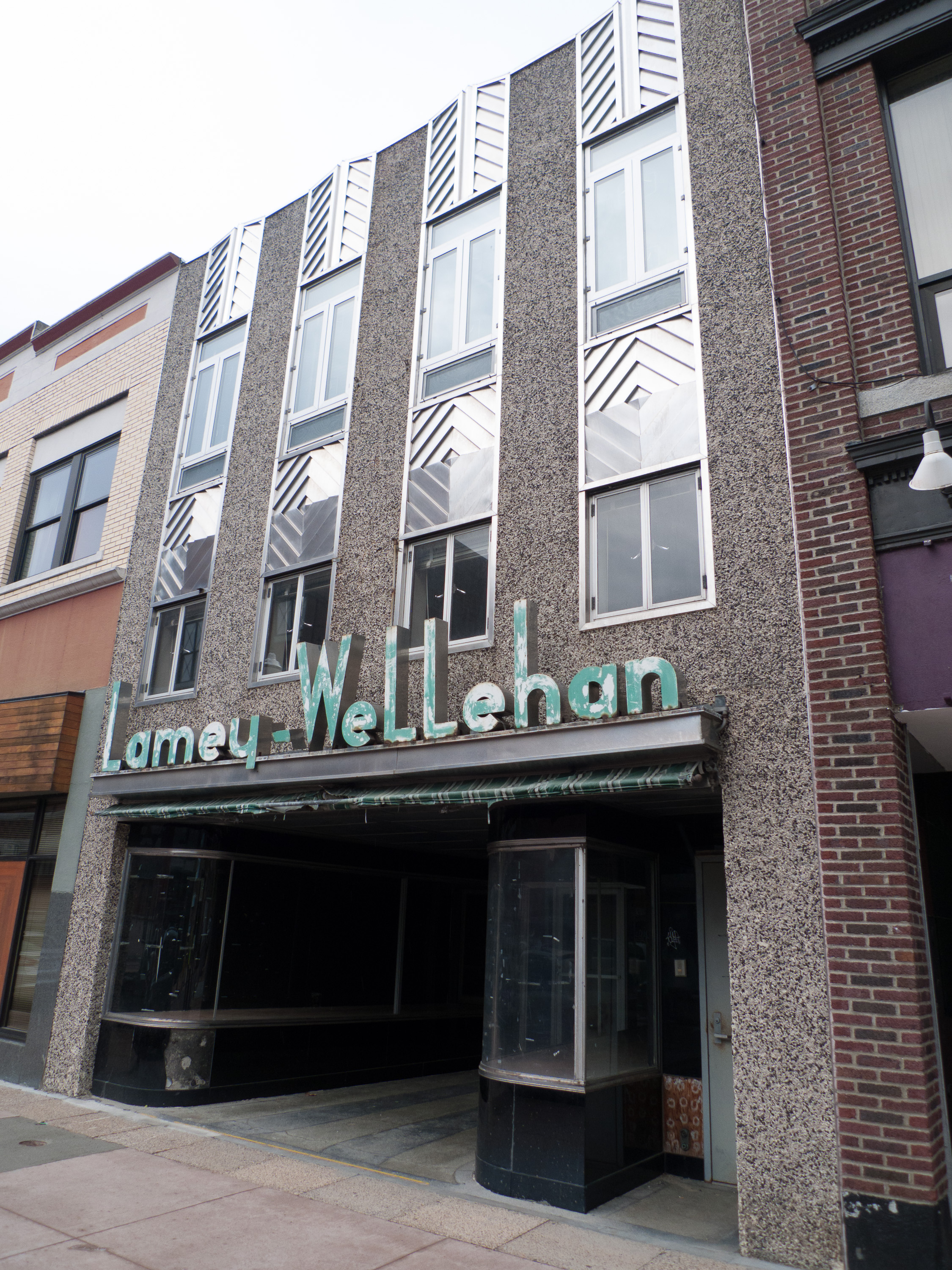
Lamey Wellehan shoe store, Lewiston, Maine, 1936

Harry S. Coombs (1878–1939) was an American architect practicing in Lewiston, Maine. He was the son of and successor to architect George M. Coombs.

== Biography ==
Harry Coombs was born in 1878 to George M. Coombs, a partner in the leading Lewiston architectural firm of Stevens & Coombs. He attended the public schools, before moving on to Bowdoin College. He graduated in 1901, and immediately entered his father's office, now Coombs & Gibbs. He worked with his father until his death in May 1909, at which point he gained his father's share in the partnership. Coombs & Gibbs was dissolved sometime in 1910, breaking into two firms, Coombs Brothers and Gibbs & Pulsifer. Coombs Brothers was composed of Harry Coombs and his brother, Frederick N. Coombs. They split in 1912, and Harry continued on his own. In 1928 he made Alonzo J. Harriman a partner, and Coombs & Harriman lasted until the former's death in 1939.

== Legacy ==
After Coombs' death, Harriman relocated the office to Auburn, where it is still in operation as Harriman Architects + Engineers.

At least nine of his designs have been individually placed on the National Register of Historic Places, and several others contribute to listed historic districts.

== Style ==
Prior to the 1930s, almost all of Coombs' work was in the Colonial Revival style. Larger examples of this are his administration building at the Central Maine General Hospital, the Rumford Municipal Building, Stearns High School at Millinocket, and the former Lewiston High School. He designed very few Gothic Revival buildings, and those that are known were all built in the first few years of his practice. Of these, the Franklin School in Auburn is most notable. Beginning in the 1930s, Coombs and his partner Harriman began to adopt the Art Deco style for many of their works, most significantly the hospital at Togus and the since-demolished High School at Brunswick.

== Architectural works ==
=== Coombs & Gibbs, 1909-1910 ===
- 1909 - Gray and Lisbon Halls, Maine School for the Feeble-Minded, New Gloucester, Maine
- 1910 - Callahan Block, 282 Lisbon St, Lewiston, Maine

=== Coombs Brothers, 1910-1912 ===
- 1910 - Viola V. Coombs House, 33 Main St, Bowdoinham, Maine
- 1911 - Hartwell Frederick House, 23 Chapel St, Augusta, Maine
- 1911 - Sisters of St. Dominic Home, 56 Birch St, Lewiston, Maine
- 1912 - Bates Street Shirt Factory, 29 Lowell St, Lewiston, Maine

=== Harry S. Coombs, 1912-1928 ===
- 1912 - Dalton Holmes Davis Memorial Library, 6 Goodspeed St, Bridgton, Maine
- 1912 - Fort Fairfield Public Library, 339 Main St, Fort Fairfield, Maine
- 1913 - Central Building, Central Maine General Hospital, 300 Main St, Lewiston, Maine
- 1913 - Chamberlain (Franklin) School, 23 High St, Auburn, Maine
- 1913 - Colonial Theater, 139 Water St, Augusta, Maine
- 1914 - Oakland Public Library, 18 Church St, Oakland, Maine
- 1915 - Goodspeed Memorial Library, 104 Main St, Wilton, Maine
- 1915 - Rumford Municipal Building, 145 Congress St, Rumford, Maine
- 1915 - Webster School, 95 Hampshire St, Auburn, Maine
- 1916 - Plymouth Hotel, 303 Main St, Fort Fairfield, Maine
  - Demolished
- 1917 - Hotel Herbert (Herbert Grand Hotel), 246 Main St, Kingfield, Maine
- 1918 - N. H. Fay High School, 174 Free St, Dexter, Maine
- 1919 - Gardiner High School, 25 Pleasant St, Gardiner, Maine
  - Demolished in 1992
- 1920 - Tyson Hall, Augusta State Hospital, Augusta, Maine
- 1922 - Atherton Building, 42 Free St, Portland, Maine
- 1922 - C. K. Burns School, 135 Middle St, Saco, Maine
- 1923 - George W. Stearns High School, 80 Maine Ave, Millinocket, Maine
- 1925 - Nurses' Home, Webber Hospital (Old), 15 Amherst St, Biddeford, Maine
- 1926 - Norway National Bank Building, 369 Main St, Norway, Maine
- 1927 - Nurses' Home, Augusta State Hospital, Augusta, Maine

=== Coombs & Harriman, 1928-1939 ===
- 1930 - Lewiston High School (Former), 75 Central Ave, Lewiston, Maine
- 1931 - Auburn Hall, Pownal State School, New Gloucester, Maine
  - The school's hospital facility.
- 1931 - Hotel Harris (Rebuilding), 25 Hartford St, Rumford, Maine
- 1932 - Togus VA Hospital, Pond Rd, Chelsea, Maine
- 1933 - Coolidge Library, 17 S Main St, Solon, Maine
- 1935 - Mexico High School, 15 Recreation Dr, Mexico, Maine
- 1936 - Brunswick High School, 44 McKeen St, Brunswick, Maine
  - Demolished in 2009
- 1936 - Lamey-Wellehan Store, 110 Lisbon St, Lewiston, Maine
