= Rumford Falls Power Company Building =

- U.S. National Register of Historic Places
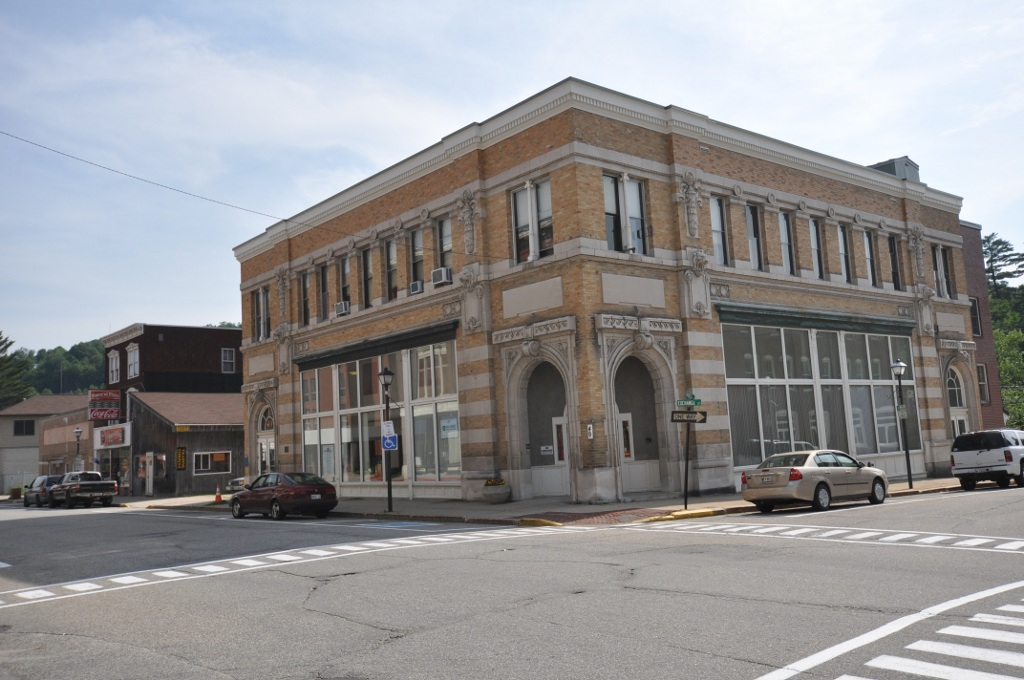

- Location within Maine Location within the United States
- Location: 59 Congress St., Rumford, Maine
- Coordinates: 44°32′41″N 70°32′47″W
- Area: 0.3 acres (0.12 ha)
- Built: 1906
- Architect: Henry J. Hardenbergh
- Architectural style: architecture, Beax Arts Classicism
- MPS: Rumford Commercial MRA
- NRHP reference No.: 80000243
- Added to NRHP: May 13, 1980

The Rumford Falls Power Company Building is a historic commercial building at 59 Congress Street in the central business district of Rumford, Maine. This two-story Beaux Arts building was designed by New York City architect Henry J. Hardenbergh and built by Frank Bunker Gilbreth in 1906 for the Rumford Falls Power Company, the enterprise responsible for Rumford's main period of growth in the late 19th and early 20th centuries. (Gilbreth built two buildings in Rumford under the same contract, the other being the Strathglass Building.) The building was listed on the National Register of Historic Places in 1980.

== Description and history ==
The Rumford Falls Power Company was founded in 1882 by the Canadian-American entrepreneur Hugh J. Chisholm, who recognized the power potential of the Rumford Falls on the Androscoggin River. The company dammed the river, ran a railroad line to the area, and built what was essentially a company town organized around the production of paper products. The company retained architect Henry J. Hardenbergh to design its offices in downtown Rumford. He is probably best known for the first instance (no longer standing) of the Waldorf Astoria New York and Boston's historic Copley Plaza Hotel.

The building Hardenbergh designed is a two-story brick-and-concrete structure, standing at the southwest corner of Congress and Exchange Street. Its two street-facing facades are essentially identical, divided into three sections separated by projecting piers. These piers consist of alternating bands of yellow brick and concrete on the first level, a molded concrete shield panel at the level of a band separating the first and second levels, and a decorative cornstalk-motif panel set in an otherwise brick pier at the second level. The two outer bays of each elevation are small, housing only arched entries; the outer bays have been enclosed with glass doorways, while that at the corner has a single recessed entry accessible via either arch. The central bay at the first level consists of an array of plate glass windows, topped by a metal cornice. The second level central bay has seven sash windows, separated by brick piers topped by concrete medallion. The outer bays of the upper level have paired sash windows separated by slender columns. A concrete banding course separates the second level windows from a brick entablature and simple dentillated cornice. The building originally carried a wide cornice topped by a low urned parapet, but this has been removed.

== See also ==
- National Register of Historic Places listings in Oxford County, Maine
