= Cary Library =

- U.S. National Register of Historic Places
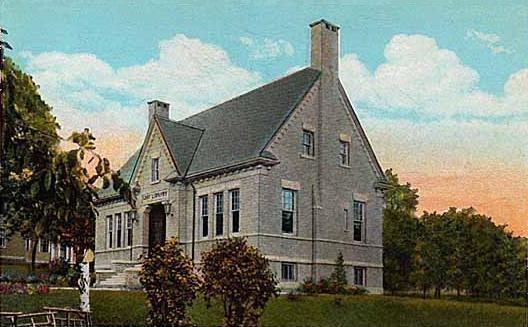
- The Cary Library in a 1920 postcard

- Location within Maine Location within the United States
- Location: 107 Main Street, Houlton, Maine
- Coordinates: 46.12541°N 67.83747°W
- Area: less than one acre
- Architect: John Calvin Stevens
- Architectural style: Classical Revival
- NRHP reference No.: 87000929
- Added to NRHP: June 25, 1987

The Cary Library is the public library of Houlton, Maine, US. It is located at 107 Main Street, in an architecturally distinguished building designed by John Calvin Stevens. The building was added to the National Register of Historic Places in 1987. The library opened on October 12, 1904.

== Architecture and history ==
Houlton's first attempts to establish a library began in 1850 with a private collection. After two such efforts failed, a third effort begun in 1896 succeeded. This effort was significantly aided by a major bequest from the estate of Dr. George Cary, a local medical doctor and onetime state legislator. This bequest was further augmented with funding from industrialist and philanthropist Andrew Carnegie, who gave $10,000 to the campaign. Prominent Portland architect John Calvin Stevens was commissioned to the design the building, which was completed in 1904.

The building designed by Stevens bears a significant resemblance to a recently completed earlier commission, the Rumford Public Library. It is a 1 1/2-story T-shaped structure, built out of coursed ashlar granite. It has a steeply pitched side gable slate roof, with chimneys at each end. The main (north-facing) facade is three bays wide, with a projecting central bay topped by a gable. The outer bays each have a bank of three sash windows, with granite sills and lintels. The projecting center section shelters the main entrance, which is recessed behind an arched opening, above which is a stone placard naming the building and a small sash window in the gable. The building's cornices are detailed with dentil stonework. A major expansion to the rear in 1968 gave the building its present T shape. The interior was originally laid out with a central circulation desk, flanked on either side by reading rooms, with the stack area in the projecting section to the rear. The original desk has since been removed.

== See also ==
- National Register of Historic Places listings in Aroostook County, Maine
- List of Carnegie libraries in Maine
