= Bridgton Public Library =

- Dalton Holmes Davis Memorial Library
- U.S. National Register of Historic Places
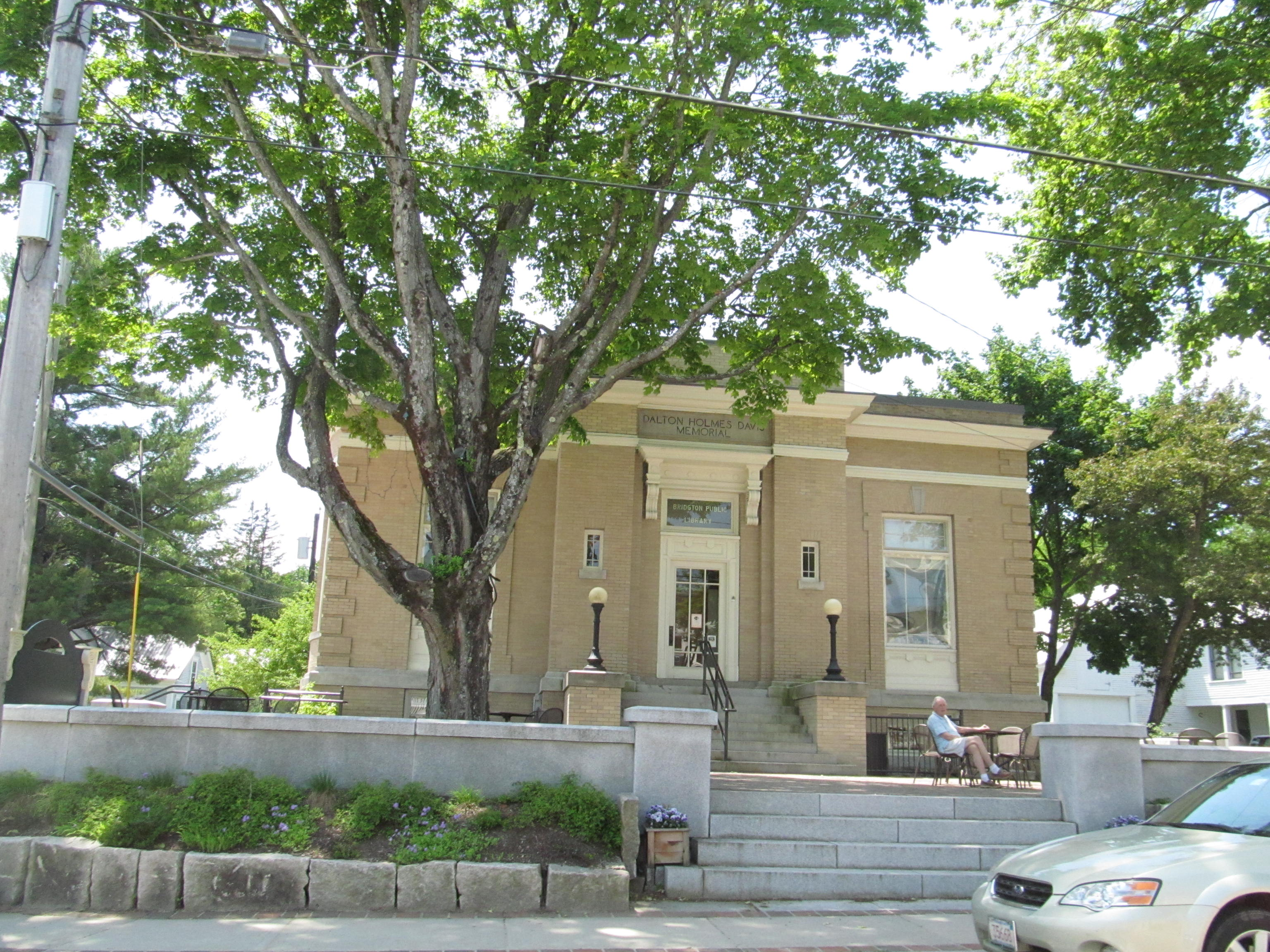

- Location within Maine Location within the United States
- Location: Bridgton, Maine
- Coordinates: 44°3′15.14″N 70°42′37.01″W
- Built: 1913
- Architect: Coombs, Harry S.
- Architectural style: Classical Revival
- MPS: Maine Public Libraries MPS
- NRHP reference No.: 88003020
- Added to NRHP: January 5, 1989

The Bridgton Public Library, formerly the Dalton Holmes Davis Memorial Library, is the public library of Bridgton, Maine. It is located at 1 Church Street, in an architecturally distinguished Classical Revival building designed by Harry S. Coombs and built in 1913. The building is listed on the National Register of Historic Places.

== Architecture and history ==
The library is at the corner of Main and Church Streets in Bridgton's village center, and is oriented with its main entrance north, toward Main Street. It is a single-story masonry structure, built out of brick with stone trim elements. It is set on a raised foundation, with a flight of stairs leading to the main entrance, flanked by low parapets on which are mounted original wrought iron lamp posts with globular lights. The entrance is centered on the main facade, with a transom window above that is sheltered by a decorative bracketed hood. This is flanked by projecting pilaster-like brick shafts, with narrow windows set at their centers. The buildings corners have brick quoining, and it is topped by a hip roof. The side elevations have bowed windows, and the rear is taken up by a wide rectangular extension that houses the book stacks. The interior retains original woodwork and fixtures, and is organized with a central librarian's desk, reading rooms to either side, and the stacks to the rear.

The first libraries in the town of Bridgton were subscription libraries, the oldest documented one dating to 1819. The present Bridgton Library Corporation was established in 1895, and its collection was held in commercial spaces until the present building was built in 1913. It was designed by Lewiston architect Harry S. Coombs, and was the third of four he is known to have designed. The fourth, that for the Wilton Free Public Library, is nearly identical to this one.

== Organization and finances ==
The library is managed by a non-governmental body founded in 1895, and is supported in part by the town. Every July 4, the 4 mile Four on the Fourth Road Race is held to raise funds for the library.

== See also ==
- Bridgton, Maine
- List of Registered Historic Places in Cumberland County, Maine
