= Oakland Library =

Oakland Library may refer to:

- Oakland Public Library, in Oakland, California
- African American Museum and Library at Oakland, in Oakland, California
- Oakland Public Library, in Oakland, Maine
- Oakland Library, a branch of the Lee County Library in Georgia
