= Rumford Municipal Building =

- Municipal Building
- U.S. National Register of Historic Places
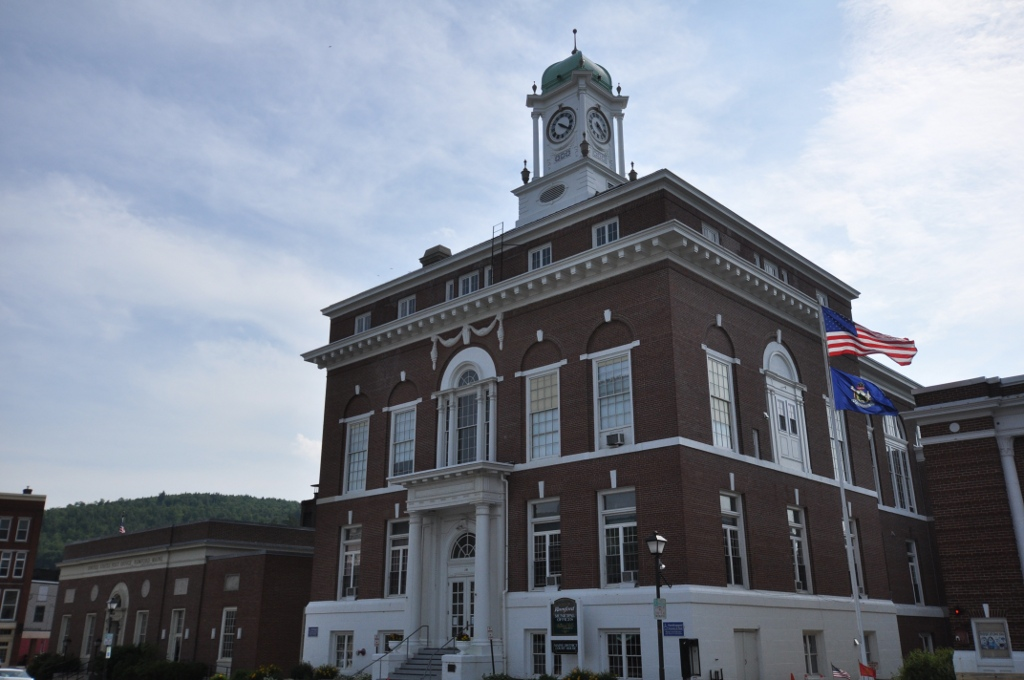

- Location within Maine Location within the United States
- Location: Congress St., Rumford, Maine
- Coordinates: 44°32′48″N 70°32′47″W
- Area: 0.5 acres (0.20 ha)
- Built: 1916
- Architect: Harry S. Coombs
- Architectural style: Colonial Revival
- MPS: Rumford Commercial MRA
- NRHP reference No.: 80000242
- Added to NRHP: May 13, 1980

The Rumford Municipal Building is located on Congress Street in the central business district of Rumford, Maine. Built in 1915 to a design by Lewiston architect Harry S. Coombs, it continues to house the town's municipal offices today. It is a fine example of Colonial Revival architecture, representing the town's growth in the early decades of the 20th century, and was listed on the National Register of Historic Places in 1980.

== Description and history ==
The town of Rumford, Maine experienced rapid growth with the arrival in the 1880s of industrialist Hugh J. Chisholm and the railroad in the 1890s. Chisholm in 1893 established the paper processing industry that still dominates the town, and its population and central business district grew rapidly in the following decades. This growth prompted the need for a new town hall, and in 1915 the town retained Harry S. Coombs, a Maine architect based in Lewiston, to design a new municipal building, with a projected cost of $25,000. The building Coombs designed ended up costing $95,000 to complete.

The building Coombs designed is a 2-1/2 story Colonial Revival structure, faced in brick with granite trim. The main block is five bays wide, set on a raised foundation, with a hip roof topped by a clocktower with a coppered cupola. The main entrance, centered on the front facade, is accessed via a small flight of stairs, and is sheltered by a portico supported by Doric columns. The portico has an entablature topped by an extended dentillated cornice. First floor windows are rectangular sash windows with a decorative granite keystone. The second floor window above the entry is a Palladian window, its sections separated by engaged columns, with a swag decoration above. The remaining second floor windows are rectangular, with a recessed round-arch section above. There is a cornice line separating the second floor from the attic level, which has groups of smaller windows just below the roof.

== See also ==
- National Register of Historic Places listings in Oxford County, Maine
