= Vinalhaven Public Library =

- U.S. National Register of Historic Places
- Location within Maine
- Location: 6 Carver St., Vinalhaven, Maine
- Coordinates: 44°2′55″N 68°49′55″W
- Area: less than one acre
- Built: 1906
- Architect: Clough & Wardner
- Architectural style: Prairie School
- MPS: Maine Public Libraries MPS
- NRHP reference No.: 88003014
- Added to NRHP: January 5, 1989

The Vinalhaven Public Library is the public library serving the island community of Vinalhaven, Maine. It is located at 6 Carver Street in downtown Vinalhaven, in a small architecturally distinguished Prairie School building built in 1906 with financial support from Andrew Carnegie. The building was listed on the National Register of Historic Places in 1989.

== Architecture and history ==
The Vinalhaven Public Library stands near the eastern end of Vinalhaven's commercial downtown area, at the junction of Carver, Chestnut, and Main Streets. The building is a single-story structure, built out of quarry-faced granite and covered by a hip roof. The roof has extended eaves with exposed rafters, with a chimney rising near the left wall. The main entrance is in the center of the facade facing Carver Street, recessed under a round arch in a projecting section topped by a flat parapet. A high stringcourse runs beneath a narrow band of square windows on either side of the entrance. The interior has a central librarian's desk with flanking reading rooms, and original wooden shelving on the walls.

Vinalhaven's public library originated in 1887, when Governor Joseph R. Bodwell, owner of one of Vinalhaven's granite quarries, made a pledge to provide space for a library if funds were raised to establish one. A private circulating library was added to this early collection in 1890, and was established in Vinalhaven's Memorial Hall in 1895. The present building was constructed in 1906, funded in part by a grant from Andrew Carnegie. It was designed by the firm of George A. Clough and Herbert L. Wardner, and is the only Prairie School library design in the state.

== See also ==
- National Register of Historic Places listings in Knox County, Maine
- List of Carnegie libraries in Maine
