= Webster Grammar School =

- U.S. National Register of Historic Places
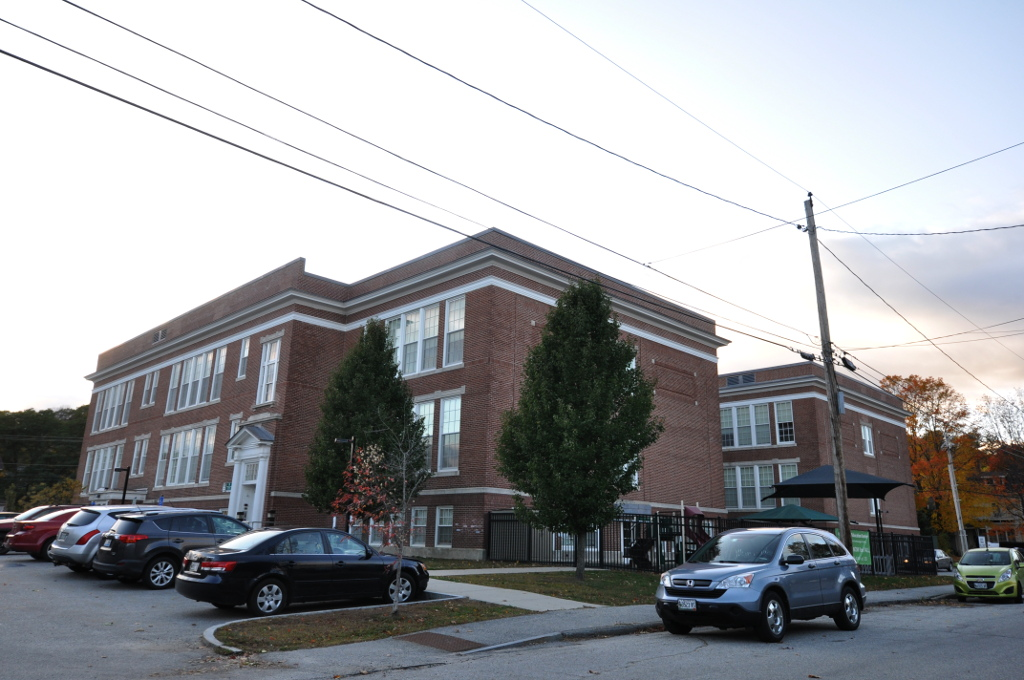

- Location within Maine Location within the United States
- Location: 95 Hampshire St, Auburn, Maine
- Coordinates: 44°6′4″N 70°13′52″W
- Built: 1915
- Architect: Harry S. Coombs
- Architectural style: Colonial Revival
- NRHP reference No.: 10000806
- Added to NRHP: September 30, 2010

The Webster Grammar School is an historic former school building at 95 Hampshire Street in Auburn, Maine. Built in 1915-16 to a design by Harry S. Coombs, it was one of the first junior high school buildings in New England, and is a fine local example of Colonial Revival architecture. The building is now apartments and a community center, and was added to the National Register of Historic Places in September 2010.

== Description and history ==
The Webster Grammar School stands in a residential area northwest of downtown Auburn, on a lot bounded by Hampshire, Willow, and Webster Streets. It is a U-shaped two-story brick building, with a flat roof and Colonial Revival features. Its original main entrance faces southwest toward Hampshire Street, and is distinguished by a projecting section with four two-story engaged Doric columns. The bays between the columns have keystoned rounded-arch openings, with the center one housing the recessed entrance. A modern entrance has been built at the center of the U, which is on what was the rear (Webster Street) facade.

The school's first building (45 Spring Street) was built in 1874, and designed by Fassett & Stevens of Lewiston. It was a simple High Victorian Gothic building, since demolished. The present building was built in 1915 to a design by Harry S. Coombs, a distant successor to Fassett & Stevens. The concept of a junior high school was introduced in the early 20th century, and the state of Maine introduced more rigorous curriculum requirements in the decade before this school was built. The school provided facilities for a more practical and hands-on education, particularly directed at students who were likely to leave school after the eighth grade. It served as a junior high school until 1981, when it was converted to serve grades 4-6. It was closed in 2006, and has been converted into housing and a community center.

== Notable alumni ==
- Charles B. Carter (1880-1927), professional football player and member of the Maine Senate.

== See also ==
- National Register of Historic Places listings in Androscoggin County, Maine
