= Madison Public Library (Maine) =

Public library building in Madison, Maine, U.S.

- U.S. National Register of Historic Places
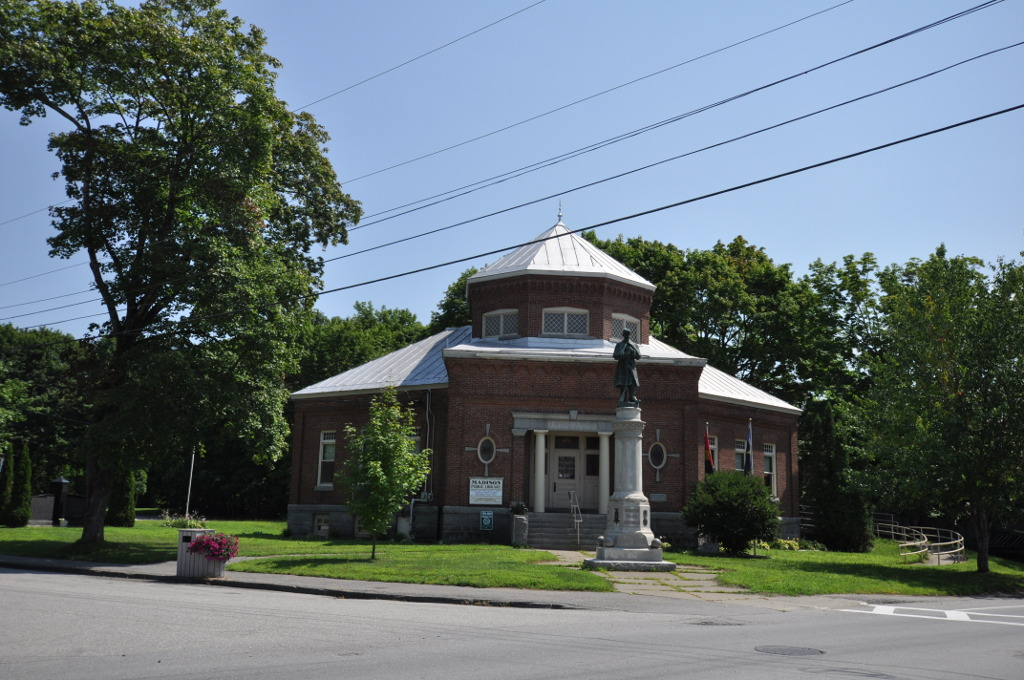

- Location within Maine Location within the United States
- Location: 12 Old Point Ave., Madison, Maine, U.S.
- Coordinates: 44°47′46″N 69°52′48″W
- Area: 1 acre (0.40 ha)
- Built: 1906
- Architects: Snow & Humphreys
- Architectural style: Classical Revival
- MPS: Maine Public Libraries MPS
- NRHP reference No.: 88003022
- Added to NRHP: January 5, 1989

The Madison Public Library is a public library building located at 12 Old Point Avenue in Madison, Maine, United States. Built with funding support from Andrew Carnegie, it is one of the architecturally most unusual libraries in the state, with a distinctive octagonal tower and non-rectangular angled elements. It was designed by the local firm of Snow and Humphreys and completed in 1906. The building was listed on the National Register of Historic Places in 1989.

== History ==
The library is set at the southeast corner of Old Point Avenue and Pleasant Street, near the center of the main village of Madison. It is a single-story structure built of brick and stone, with Classical Revival features. The building is roughly triangular in shape, with two rectangular sections joined by an angled main facade that faces the street corner. The rectangular sections have standing-seam metal hip roofs, interrupted at the center by an octagonal tower, whose front-facing sections have diamond-pane windows, and which is encircled by a band of decorative brick corbelling.

The front facade has a recessed entry section with stone columns and brick pilasters flanking, and a band of corbelled brickwork below a stone balustrade. The interior of the building is arranged with reading rooms and stacks in the rectangular side wings.

The idea of the formation and the founding of a public library in Madison originated with some ten or fifteen young ladies known as the "Ladies' Non-Sectarian Club" which was formed in 1885. Among its members were Ruth Manter, Alice Blake, Jennie Knowlton, Emma Manter, Addie Smith, Mable Simonds, Fannie Perkins, Ada Towne, Emma Heald, Nellie Moore and Gertrude Kent. On May 11, 1886, the Madison Library Association was formed.

The Madison Public Library was founded in 1886, and was housed in commercial spaces until this building was built in 1906, supported in part by an $8,000 grant from Andrew Carnegie. Designed by the local firm of Snow and Humphreys, its tower and angled wings are distinctive features not seen in other libraries throughout the state.

== Description ==
The Madison Public Library is an L-shaped one-story brick building featuring one of the most unusual compositions in Maine. This distinction derives from the arrangement of the wide projecting entrance block that projects from the angled rectangular wings. Rising above the intersection of these three components is an octagonal tower capped by a similarly configured standing seam metal roof. The building stands on a corner lot near the community's commercial district.

Facing northwest, the facade features a flight of granite steps that rise to a narrow recessed porch framed by two pilasters and a pair of smooth stone columns set in antis. They support a stone entablature decorated with a keystone. Oval windows with four equally spaced stone voussoirs flank the entrance, and all three components are located within a wall surface with corner pilasters and a corbeled string-course. Crowning the elevation is a corbeled cornice. The wings that extend at obtuse angles from the entrance contain reading rooms and the book stacks. Their primary walls are punctuated by a trio of symmetrically placed one-over-one windows surmounted by Queen Anne transoms. Corbeled cornices meet the string-course set up on the facade. Three small windows located on axis with the main units punctuate the granite foundation on each wing, a pattern repeated throughout.

The endwall of the south wing contains four equally spaced double-hung windows with transoms and a modern doorway for handicapped access. Its counterpart on the east wing features 2 of the standard windows as well as 4 smaller one-over-one units arranged in horizontal rows of two, one above the other. This fenestration denotes the location of the book stack and its configuration is carried across the back side with six windows. Two additional openings punctuate the back wall of the south wing.

The crossing tower has 3 wide diamond pane windows on its principal sides, 2 paneled divisions over the wings, as well as 2 small segmentally arched openings and the exterior chimney at the back. Circling the tower, there is a broad corbeled cornice whose detailing matches that of the entrance.

Inside, the main door leads to the hall/delivery room defined by the tower. Openings lead to the offices (remodeled from the reading room) in the south wing and a smaller reading area and the stacks in the east. To the right of the entrance is a stairway that leads to a balcony which extends around the tower. On the left, there is a bathroom. All window and door-surrounds hold on to their dark stained woodwork.

== Significance ==
The Madison Public Library was designed by the local architectural firm of Snow and Humphreys and it was completed in 1906. It is considered as one of the most unique buildings in the state. Further distinction is afforded the library by virtue of its being one of only eighteen in Maine whose construction was funded by a grant from Andrew Carnegie. The library retains integrity of location, design, setting, materials, and association. It fulfills the requirements for registration under criteria A and C for its educational and architectural importance as more fully described in the multiple property submission ‘Maine Public Libraries’.

Madison’s public library traces its history to a meeting which was held on 04 January 1886 by local townspeople. The founders of the Madison Library Corporation committed to raise 250 USD for the motive of establishing a library if the town would match this figure. As the mission was successfully completed, on 30 April 1887, the organizers opened the library on the second floor of a commercial building. The collection of books had evidently surpassed its space by 1904 and measures had to be taken for finding a solution. Andrew Carnegie was approached for a grant at that time and he gave the amount of 8,000 USD on 02 June 1904.

In July of the following year the Industrial Journal (Bangor) reported that C. L. Humphreys had recently been in Waterville to look at the newly built library for ideas on a similar facility to be erected in Madison. Humphreys apparently drew little inspiration from that building because the two are wholly different in plan and form. (Although both are very eclectic and original forms in comparison to others of the period.) In any case, work was completed by the end of 1906 and the library opened for use on January 3, 1907. It continues to function in its original capacity with only minor changes to the disposition and use of the interior space.

Centrally located in the walk leading to the library is the town’s monument to its Civil War dead. The solemn pose of a bronze figured soldier at ease stands on a tall granite pillar. It was erected here in September, 1907 having been sculpted by the Hallowell (Maine) Granite Company. It is not considered a contributing object to the library, although it merits future study in the context of war memorials in general.

== See also ==
- National Register of Historic Places listings in Somerset County, Maine
- List of Carnegie libraries in Maine
