= Alonzo J. Harriman =

American architect

- Born: July 6, 1898; Bath, Maine
- Died: September 9, 1966 (aged 68); Auburn, Maine
- Occupation: Architect

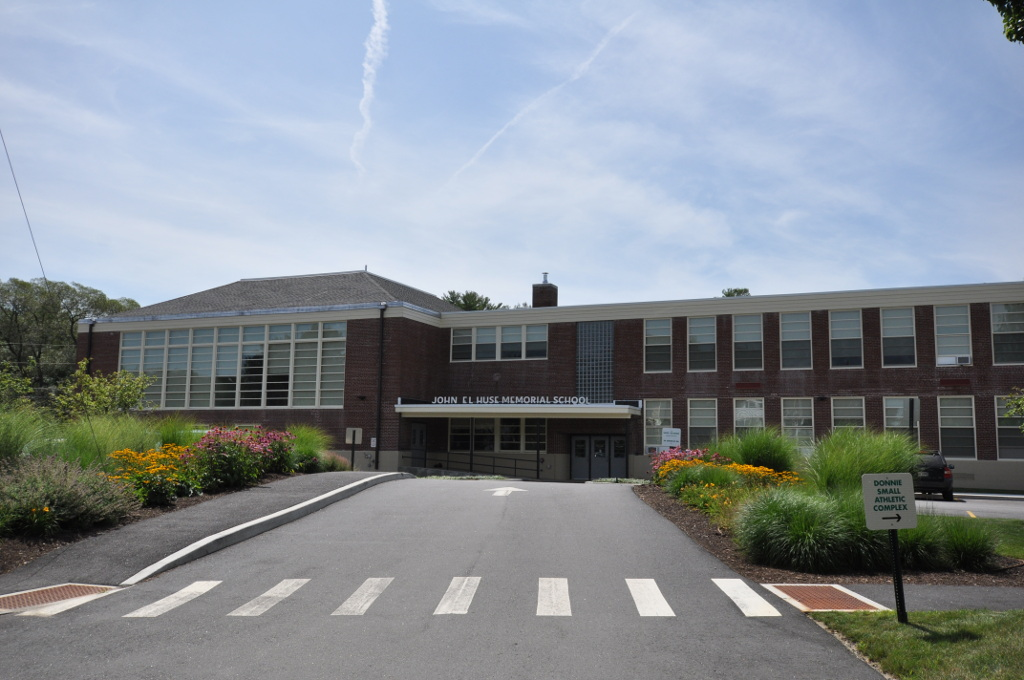
The former John E.L. Huse Memorial School in Bath, designed by Harriman and completed in 1942.

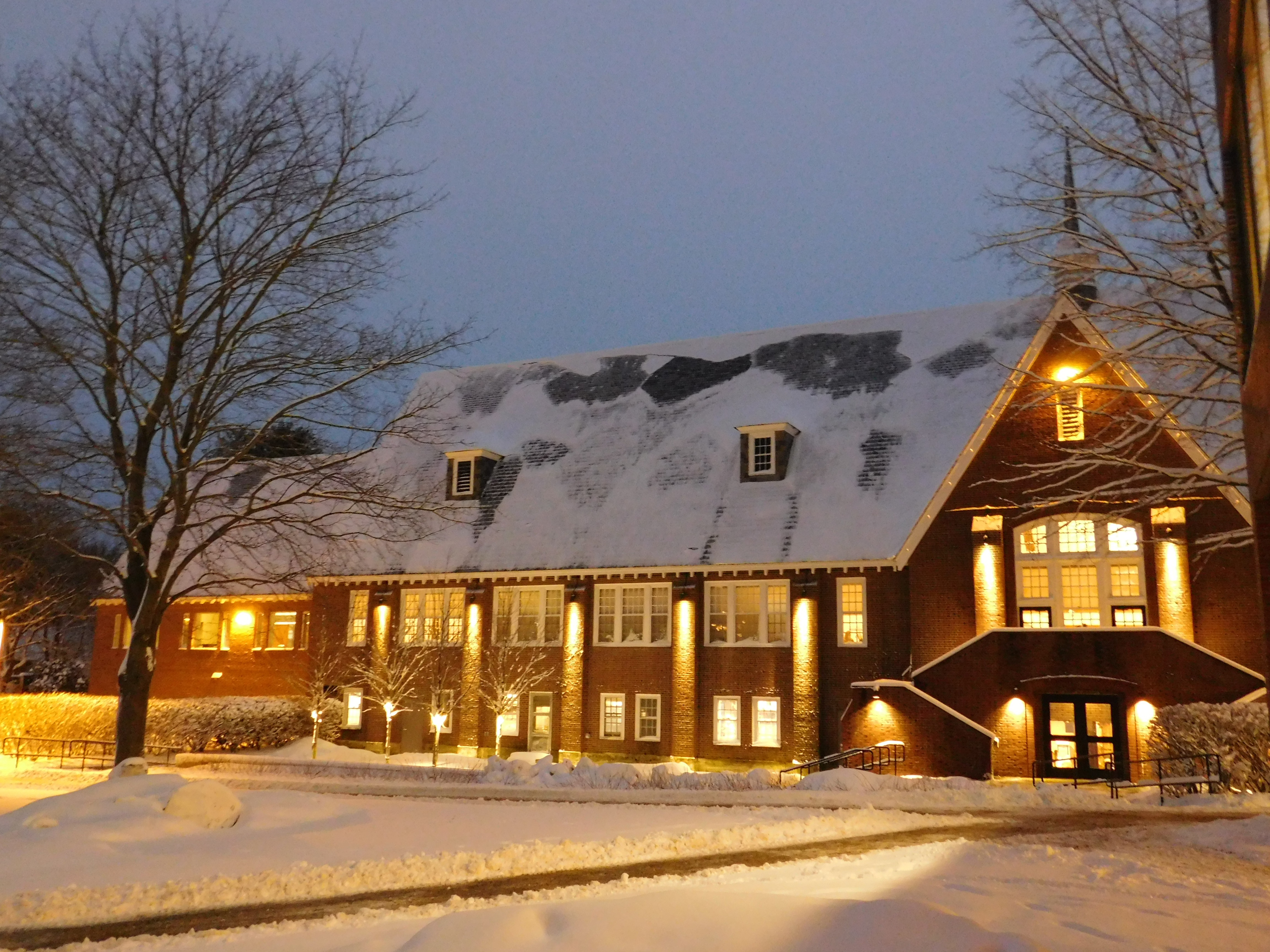
The Chase Hall Memorial Commons of Bates College, completed in 1950.

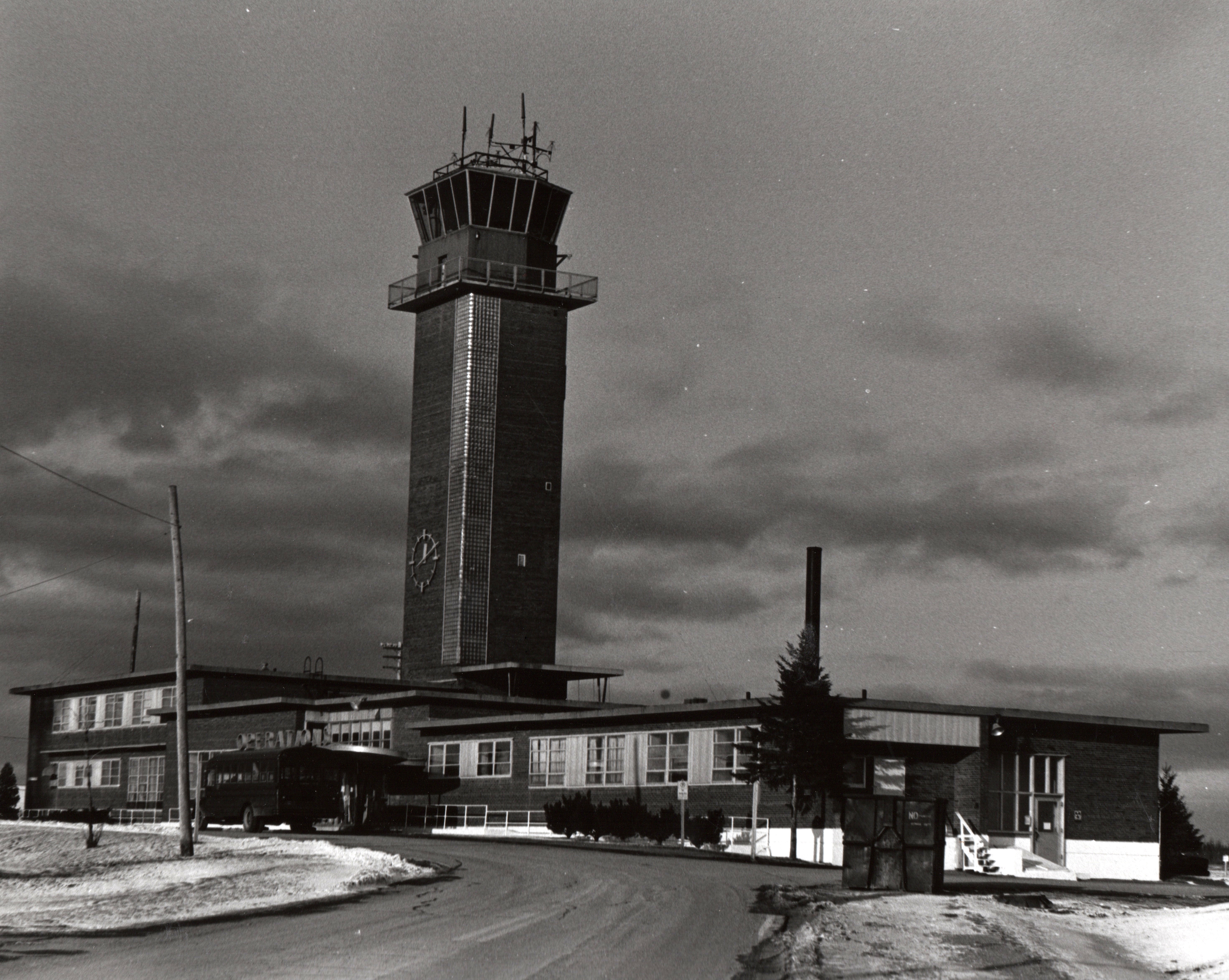
The operations building of the former Loring Air Force Base in Aroostook County, completed in 1953.

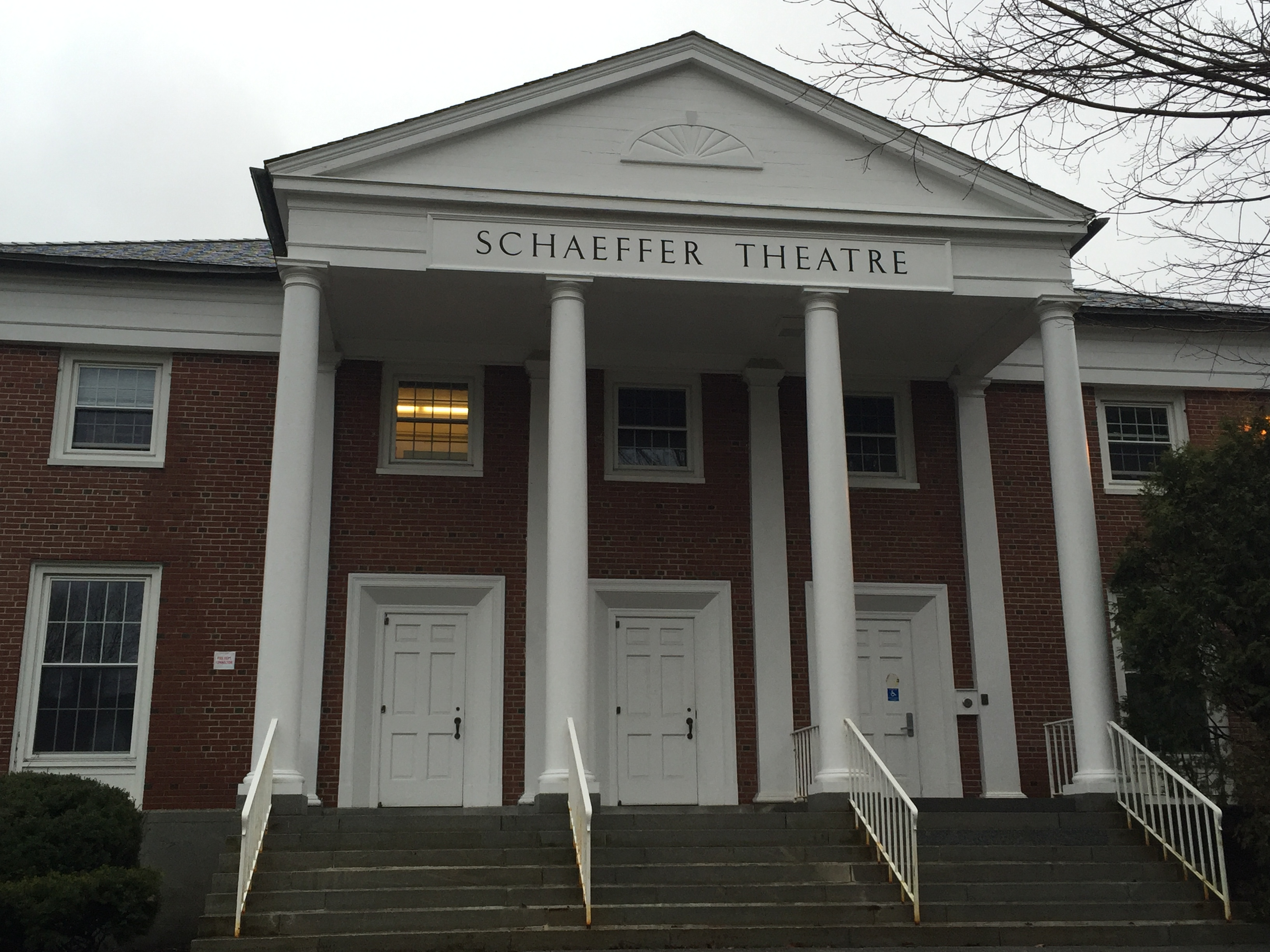
Schaeffer Theatre of Bates College, completed in 1960.

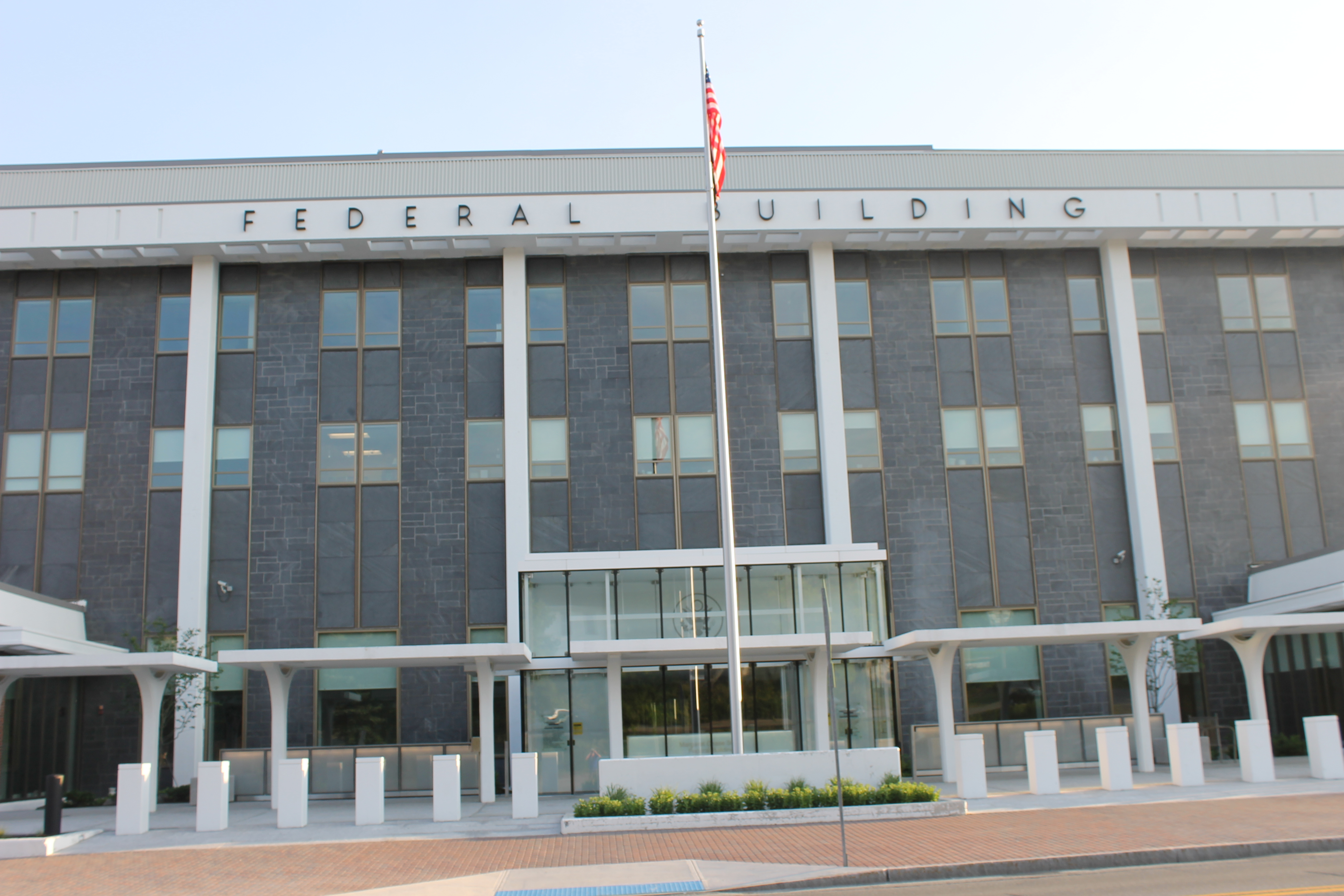
The Margaret Chase Smith Federal Building and Courthouse in Bangor, completed posthumously in 1968.

Alonzo J. Harriman FAIA (1898–1966) was an American architect in practice in Lewiston and Auburn, Maine from 1928 to 1966.

== Life and career ==
Alonzo Jesse Harriman was born July 6, 1898, in Bath, Maine to Charles Alonzo Harriman and Nellie D. (Coombs) Harriman. He was educated in the Bath public schools and graduated from Morse High School. Originally intending to be a shipbuilder, he graduated from the University of Maine in 1920 with a BS in mechanical engineering. He worked as a draftsman for Bath Iron Works during summers. After graduation he returned to Bath, but a downturn in shipbuilding after World War I caused him to take a job in the office of his uncle, Lewiston architect Harry S. Coombs, instead. In 1925 Harriman chose to go back to school, graduating from Harvard University in 1928 with a MA, having also worked part-time for Cram & Ferguson in Boston. After graduation he returned to Coombs in Lewiston, where the two architects formed a partnership, known formally as Harry S. Coombs—Alonzo J. Harriman and informally as Coombs & Harriman. Coombs retired in 1938, and Harriman moved the firm to Auburn and began practicing under his own name.

Unlike most architectural firms, Harriman's office underwent substantial growth during World War II. During and immediately after the war, Harriman won a number of major defense-adjacent contracts. These began small, with the John E.L. Huse Memorial School in Bath, a wartime welfare project, in 1941 and grew to include the shipyards of the New England Shipbuilding Corporation in South Portland in 1943 and the design of the entire Loring Air Force Base in Aroostook County in 1947. During a three-year period, 1941 to 1944, Harriman's office grew from a staff of three to one of 100, with branch offices in Bath and South Portland. Though these offices were later closed, in the 1950s he again operated a branch office in Boston. In the decade after the war, Harriman developed his firm into the largest in the state, and was an acknowledged expert in school design. In 1961 the firm was reorganized as Alonzo J. Harriman Associates, with several new principals. One of the new principals, Gridley Barrows, was director of architectural design from then until 1978. When Harriman died in 1966, his firm was noted as one of the largest firms in the United States, one of 100 firms doing 10% of all architectural work in the country.

Harriman was an important figure in bringing modern architecture to Maine. In 1951 he was noted as one of the local pioneers of modernism, along with Eaton W. Tarbell of Bangor.

== Personal life ==
Harriman was married in 1922 to Pearl Lillian Palmer and they had one son, Charles Palmer. He also raised his niece Sally who was 14 when her parents died. After many years in Lewiston, in 1939 Harriman designed and had built a Moderne house at 88 Shepley Street in Auburn, where he lived until his death. Harriman died September 9, 1966, at the age of 68.

== Legacy ==
Harriman developed one of Maine's oldest architecture firms into one of its largest. Originally founded in 1870, prior to Harriman it was successively led by several prominent Maine architects: William H. Stevens, George M. Coombs and Harry S. Coombs. It has survived well past Harriman's death, and is now (2022) known simply as Harriman.

Harriman joined the American Institute of Architects in 1947 as a member of the Maine chapter. He was chapter secretary for the year 1950–51, president for 1952–53 and from 1958 to 1961 was New England regional director. From 1951 to 1958 he was a member and from 1961 to 1963 chair of the Committee on School Buildings and Educational Buildings. In this capacity he was a delegate in 1962 to the UNESCO International Education Building Conference held in London. In 1961 he was elected a Fellow, the AIA's highest membership honor, and was awarded an honorary Doctor of Fine Arts from Bates College.

In recognition of his work as an architect, upon his death Senator Margaret Chase Smith of Maine read a summary of his life and work into the Congressional Record.

== Architectural works ==
- John E.L. Huse Memorial School (former), 39 Andrews Rd, Bath, Maine (1941–42, NRHP 2016)
- New England Shipbuilding Corporation shipyards, South Portland, Maine (1943)
- Loring Air Force Base, Limestone, Maine (1947–53)
- New England Telephone and Telegraph Company building, 60 Ash St, Lewiston, Maine (1947)
- Chase Hall Memorial Commons, Bates College, Lewiston, Maine (1949–50)
- Margaret Chase Smith house, 56 Norridgewock Ave, Skowhegan, Maine (1949)
- Ellsworth High School (former), 20 Forest Ave, Ellsworth, Maine (1950, altered)
- Gentle Memorial Building, 128 Main St, Houlton, Maine (1950–52)
- Washington Street School, 100 Washington St, Brewer, Maine (1950–52, demolished)
- Washburn School, 35 Lake Auburn Ave, Auburn, Maine (1951)
- Old Town High School, 203 Stillwater Ave, Old Town, Maine (1952)
- Bath Middle School, 6 Old Brunswick Rd, Bath, Maine (1954)
- Gardiner Savings Institution Building, 190 Water St, Gardiner, Maine (1954)
- State Street School (former), 35 State St, Westerly, Rhode Island (1954–55)
- Tower Street School (former), 93 Tower St, Westerly, Rhode Island (1954–55)
- Page Hall, Bates College, Lewiston, Maine (1956–57)
- Rundlett Middle School, 144 South St, Concord, New Hampshire (1956–57)
- Elm Street School, 478 Elm St, Laconia, New Hampshire (1957)
- Schaeffer Theatre, Bates College, Lewiston, Maine (1959–60)
- Stillings Hall, University of New Hampshire, Durham, New Hampshire (1962–63)
- Edmund S. Muskie Federal Building, 40 Western Ave, Augusta, Maine (1964–66)
- Parsons Hall, University of New Hampshire, Durham, New Hampshire (1965–66)
- Margaret Chase Smith Federal Building and Courthouse, 202 Harlow St, Bangor, Maine (1966–68)
- Worcester Foundation for Experimental Biology (former), 222 Maple Ave, Shrewsbury, Massachusetts (no date)
