= John E.L. Huse Memorial School =

- U.S. National Register of Historic Places
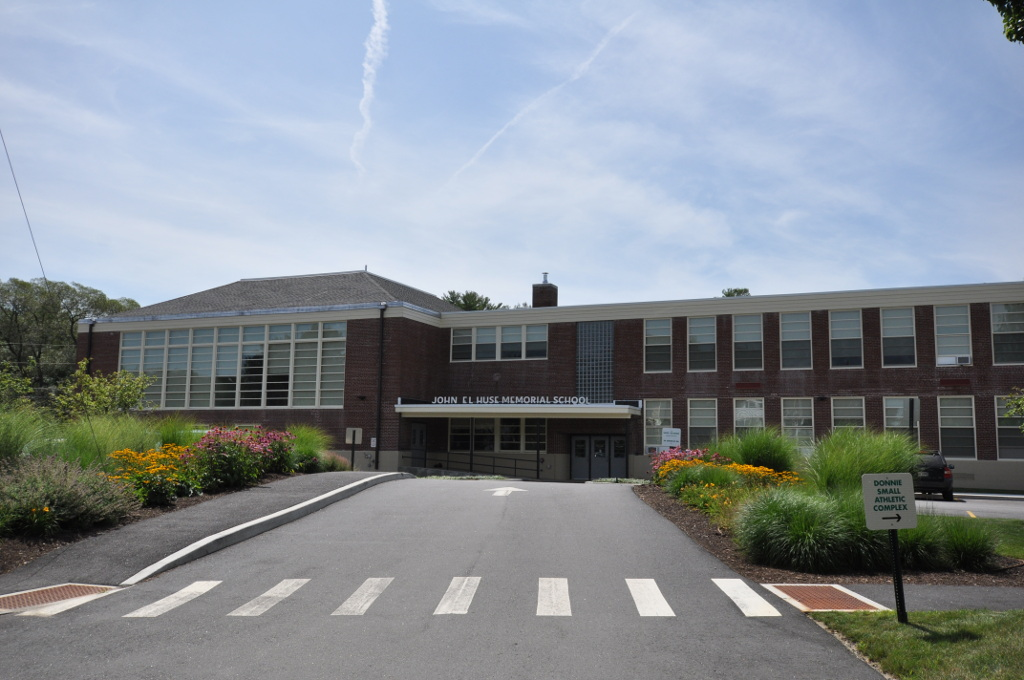

- Location within Maine Location within the United States
- Location: 39 Andrews Rd., Bath, Maine
- Coordinates: 43°54′51″N 69°49′33″W
- Area: 2.5 acres (1.0 ha)
- Built: 1942
- Architect: Alonzo J. Harriman
- Architectural style: Modern
- NRHP reference No.: 16000438
- Added to NRHP: July 11, 2016

The John E.L. Huse Memorial School is a historic former school building at 39 Andrews Street in Bath, Maine. Built in 1942, it is one of a small number of schools built in Maine with federal funding provided under the World War II-era Community Facilities Act. It was closed in 2006, and has been converted to residential use. It was listed on the National Register of Historic Places in 2016.

== Description and history ==
The former Huse Memorial School building stands in a residential area west of downtown Bath known as Hyde Park Terrace, which was also part of the federal construction program to provide facilities for defense industry workers during World War II. It is basically a long two-story rectangle, with an enlarged auditorium wing at the left (southern) end. The exterior is unadorned brick, with windows that are mainly late 20th-century replacements of original double-hung wood frame windows. The northern end of the building is a 1949 addition, whose features included more distinctive Modern touches, including the use of glass blocks.

The school was built in 1942 to a design by Alonzo J. Harriman, an architect who was a native of Bath and a graduate of Harvard University. It was built by the federal government under the terms of the Community Facilities Act of 1940 (also known as the "Lanham Act"), which provided for the construction of housing and other facilities for workers in defense industries critical to the war effort. The demand for workers at the Bath Iron Works overtaxed the area's housing supply, and the Hyde Terrace subdivision was one of several built by the government to address the housing shortage. The Huse school, named for Bath native John Huse, the city's first casualty of the war, was built to provide schooling to the children of the new development. It was turned over to the city in 1948, and used as a school until 2006. The building has been adapted to contain residential units, with a new wing added.

== See also ==
- National Register of Historic Places listings in Sagadahoc County, Maine
