= Viola Coombs House =

Historic house in Maine, United States

- U.S. National Register of Historic Places
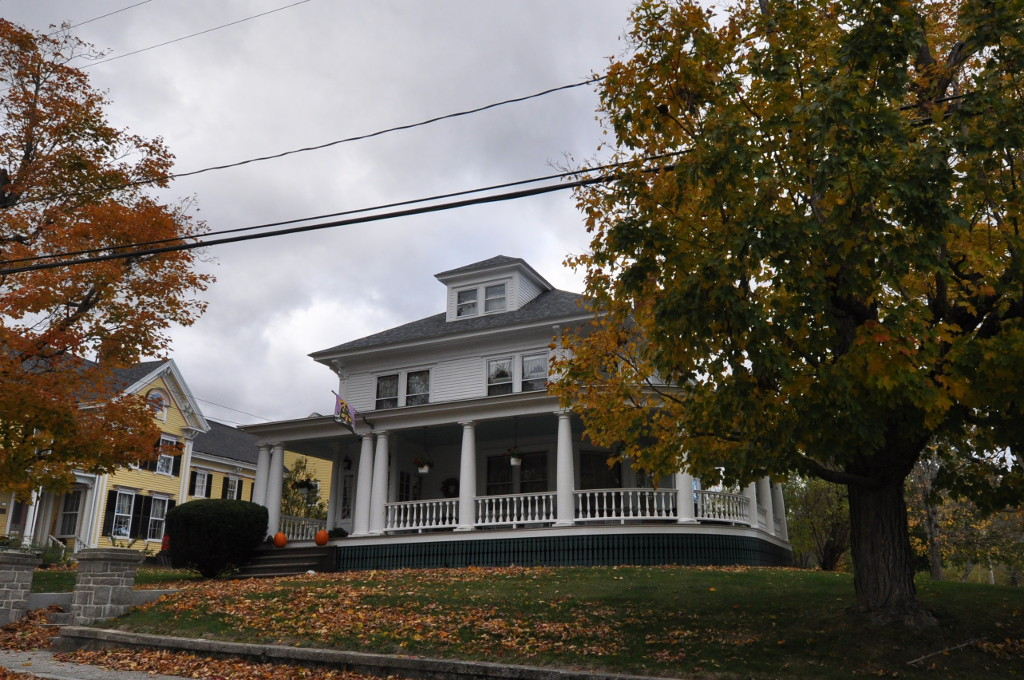

- Location within Maine Location within the United States
- Location: 33 Main St, Bowdoinham, Maine
- Coordinates: 44°0′36″N 69°53′52″W
- Area: less than one acre
- Built: c. 1910
- Architect: Coombs Brothers
- Architectural style: Colonial Revival, Queen Anne
- NRHP reference No.: 91001816
- Added to NRHP: December 13, 1991

The Viola Coombs House is a historic house at 33 Main Street in Bowdoinham, Maine. Built about 1910, it is significant as an example of transitional Colonial Revival/Queen Anne architecture in a residential setting. It was added to the National Register of Historic Places in 1991.

== Description and history ==
The Viola Coombs House stands on the north side of Main Street (Maine State Route 125), a short way east of its junction with Center Street and Back Hill Road. It is set between the Italianate Robert P. Carr House (to its left), and the Second Baptist Church (to its right). The Coombs House is a two-story wood-frame structure, roughly rectangular in plan, with a hip roof pierced on its front face by a hipped dormer. The roof has extended eaves, particularly over the front right corner of the house, which is clipped to an angle; the eaves are studded with decorative brackets. The dominant feature of the house is its porch, which extends across the front and around the right side. Its roof is supported by bulky Tuscan columns, with a balustrade of turned spindles. The main entrance is framed by sidelight and transom windows, with slender Tuscan columns flanking its outer edges. The interior features high quality period woodwork that is largely unaltered.

The house was built circa 1910 for Viola V. Coombs, a Bowdoinham native born in 1844. She commissioned the design from Harry S. Coombs, of Lewiston's Coombs Brothers architectural firm, then one of the state's leading architects.

== See also ==
- National Register of Historic Places listings in Sagadahoc County, Maine
