= Guilford Memorial Library =

Coordinates: 45.170°N 69.3830°W

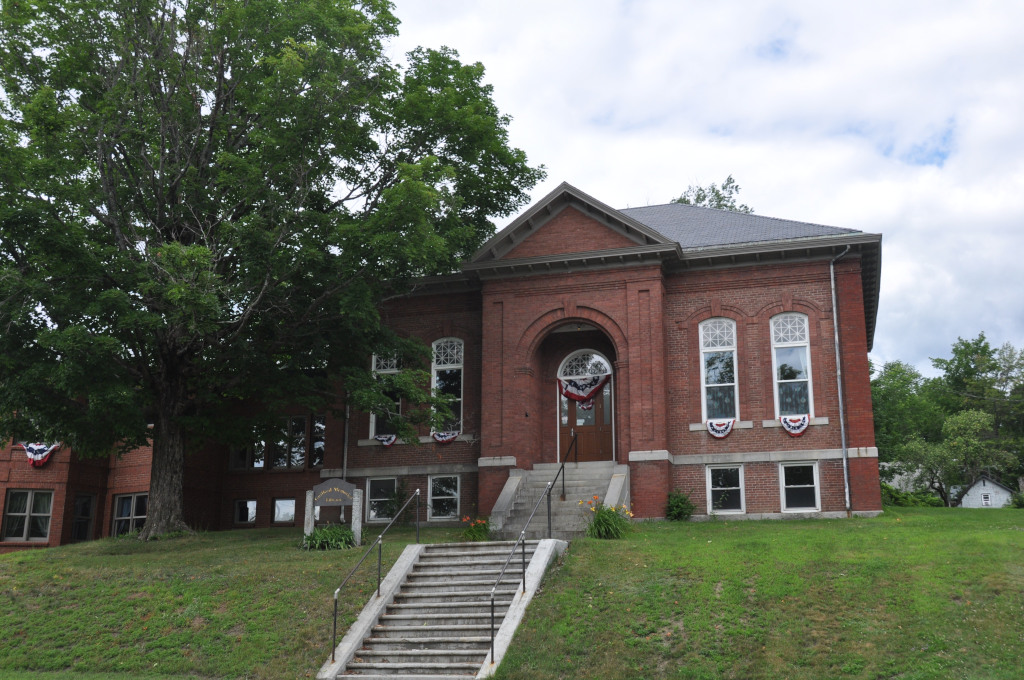
- Location: Library and Water Streets, Guilford, Maine, United States
- Type: Public

Collection
- Size: 23,000

Access and use
- Circulation: 20,000
- Population served: 1,531

Other information
- Budget: $59,100
- Director: Andrea Koltai-Price
- Employees: 2

The Guilford Memorial Library is the public library of Guilford, Maine, USA. It is located at the junction of Library and Water Streets, in a small architecturally distinguished Renaissance Revival structure designed by Frank A. Patterson and built in 1908 with funding assistance from Andrew Carnegie. The building was listed on the National Register of Historic Places in 1986. The library is one of the only libraries in Maine designated as a "Star Library" by Library Journal.

== Architecture and history ==
The Guilford Memorial Library is set on a rise overlooking the Piscataquis River. It is a single story structure, built of brick and topped by a slate hip roof. It stands on a raised basement delineated by a granite stone beltcourse. A gable-roofed section projects slightly on the front facade, sheltering the main entrance, which is deeply recessed in an archway. The entry section is flanked by pairs of segmented-arch windows with stone sills. The building corners have brick pilasters, with a band of corbelled brick and a wooden modillioned cornice below the roof.

The Guilford library began as a private subscription service in 1900, and funds were soon raised for the construction of a library building. A funding grant from Andrew Carnegie contributed to this drive. The library was designed by Bangor architect Frank A. Patterson, and is his only known library design. The building is a locally distinctive example of Renaissance Revival architecture.

== See also ==
- National Register of Historic Places listings in Piscataquis County, Maine
- List of Carnegie libraries in Maine
