= Milo Public Library =

- U.S. National Register of Historic Places
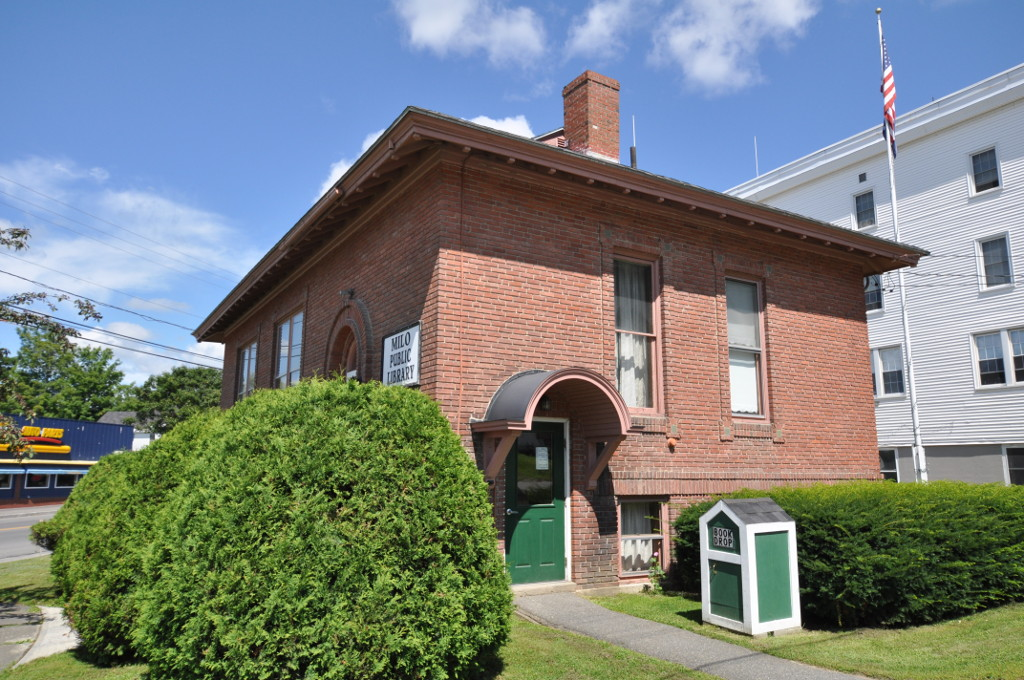

- Location within Maine Location within the United States
- Location: 121 Main Street, Milo, Maine
- Coordinates: 45°15′45″N 68°59′12″W
- Area: less than one acre
- Built: 1922
- MPS: Maine Public Libraries MPS
- NRHP reference No.: 88003017
- Added to NRHP: January 5, 1989

The Milo Public Library is located at 121 Main Street in Milo, Maine, USA. It is located in a small, architecturally distinguished building, built with funding assistance from Andrew Carnegie. The building was added to the National Register of Historic Places in 1989.

== Architecture and history ==
The Milo Public Library is set on a triangular lot in the main village of Milo, bounded by Park Street, Pleasant Street, and Milo Town Hall. It is a small rectangular brick building on a tall foundation, with a gable-on-hip roof. Its main facade faces west, and has sash windows in the leftmost bays, and a round-arched opening for the entrance on the right. The door is topped by a semicircular fanlight, and is accessed by concrete steps. The basement level is set off from the main level by a brick stringcourse, and there are smaller windows providing illumination to that level below those on the main level. The interior is arranged with the circulation desk and office in the southern end, with a shelf-lined reading room occupying the remaining space. There is a second reading room in the basement.

Milo's first library was a "traveling library" organized in 1902 by local members of the Women's Christian Temperance Union (WCTU). It was housed in a private residence until 1909, when it was given space in the local Odd Fellows hall. The WCTU Public Library Association was established at that time, and secured a $10,000 grant from the Carnegie Corporation in 1921. The town agreed to provide land for the library and funding for its maintenance. The building is a modified version of a Type F Carnegie library plan, its modifications designed by Bangor architect Frank A. Paterson, and was completed in 1922.

== See also ==
- National Register of Historic Places listings in Piscataquis County, Maine
- List of Carnegie libraries in Maine
