= Colonial Theater (Augusta, Maine) =

- U.S. National Register of Historic Places
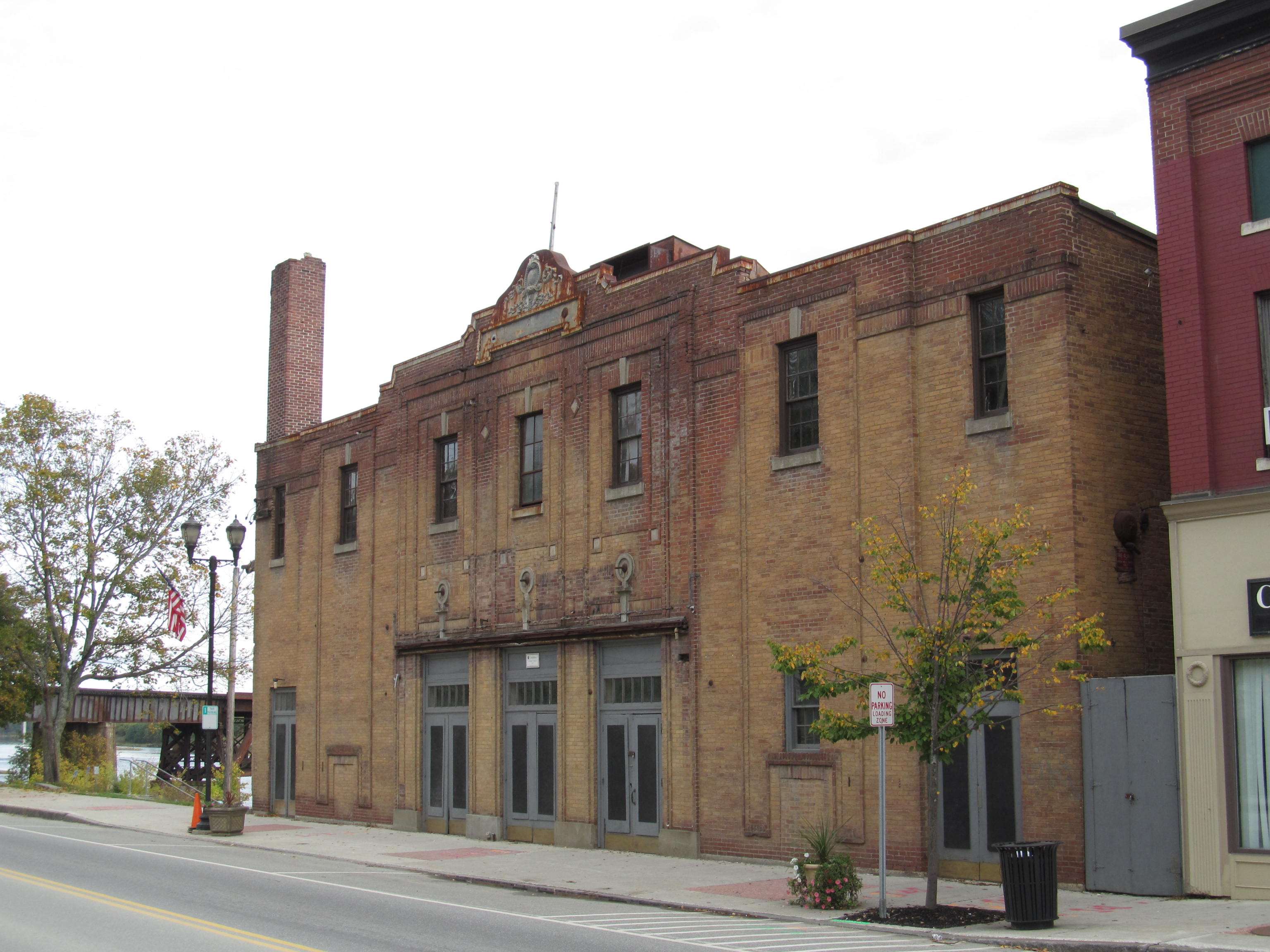

- Location within Maine Location within the United States
- Location: 139 Water St., Augusta, Maine
- Coordinates: 44°19′4″N 69°46′24″W
- Built: 1913; 1926
- Architect: Harry S. Coombs
- Architectural style: Beaux Arts; Art Deco
- NRHP reference No.: 14000834
- Added to NRHP: October 8, 2014

The Colonial Theater is a historic movie theater at 139 Water Street in downtown Augusta, Maine. Built in 1913 and rebuilt after a fire in 1926, it is a fine example of Beaux Arts architecture, with features presaging the Art Deco movement. It is the last surviving movie theater building in downtown Augusta. It was listed on the National Register of Historic Places in 2014, at which time had been standing vacant for many years.

== Description and history ==
The Colonial Theater stands near the northern end of Water Street, Augusta's principal commercial downtown thoroughfare. It stands on the east side of the street, just south of the junction with Commercial Street, with the Kennebec River at its rear. It is a large rectangular two-story masonry building, constructed out of brick, with a flat roof and a concrete foundation. Its main facade is seven bays wide, divided into five sections separated by brick piers. The outer sections have secondary exits on the ground floor, while the center section has three bays, each of which has a main entrance on the ground level. The upper level bays have sash windows with granite sills, with all but the outer bays also having keystones above. The center three bays are topped by a decorative parapet. The interior of the retains a significant amount of original material, but has deteriorated in a number of places due to damage by water and wildlife that has gained entry in its long period of vacancy.

The theater was built in 1913 to a design by Harry S. Coombs, then one of the state's leading architects. It is the last of downtown Augusta's theaters to stand, and is unusual in the downtown for its Beaux Arts and Georgian Revival features, along with features that hint at the later Art Deco style. The building was extensively damaged by fire in 1926, and rebuilt, making modest alterations that accentuated the emerging Art Deco features. The theater's early history included the showing of silent movies with live orchestral accompaniment; the stage was eventually extended over the orchestra pit. It was the site that premiered silent films produced by Maine native Holman Francis Day (now apparently lost). It had a nominal seating capacity of about 1200. It was one of two theaters built on Water Street; the other burned down in 1983.

== See also ==
- National Register of Historic Places listings in Kennebec County, Maine
