= List of Carnegie libraries in Maine =

Maine Carnegie libraries
(public,: academic,: multiple)

The following list of Carnegie libraries in Maine provides detailed information on United States Carnegie libraries in Maine, where 18 public libraries were built from 18 grants (totaling $241,450) awarded by the Carnegie Corporation of New York from 1901 to 1912. In addition, academic libraries were built at 2 institutions (totaling $70,000).

== Key ==
Building still operating as a library
Building standing, but now serving another purpose
Building no longer standing
Building listed on the National Register of Historic Places
Building contributes to a historic district on the National Register of Historic Places

== Public libraries ==
	Library	City or town	Image	Date granted	Grant amount	Location	Notes
1	Auburn	Auburn		Jan 13, 1903	$25,000	49 Spring St. 44°5′52.59″N 70°13′44.66″W	Opening on August 1, 1904, this William R. Miller of Portland design has been renovated and expanded in 1956, 1978, and 2005.
2	Caribou	Caribou		Mar 21, 1910	$10,000	30 High St. 46°51′39.06″N 68°0′39.69″W	Designed by local architect Schuyler C. Page in the Romanesque Revival style, this library was renovated in the 1960s.
3	Fort Fairfield	Fort Fairfield		Feb 20, 1911	$10,000	339 Main St. 46°46′2.97″N 67°48′0.62″W	Built in 1913, this library added a wing in 1993.
4	Freeport	Freeport		Mar 14, 1905	$6,500	55 Main St. 43°51′19.51″N 70°6′23.15″W	Designed by George Burnham, this library was closed in 1997 when a new library was built. It is now a private business.
5	Gardiner	Gardiner		December 22, 1897	$2,500	152 Water St. 44°13′43.44″N 69°46′15.48″W	Gardiner's grant was to complete an unfinished library. It was designed and begun in 1881 by local architect Henry Richards.
6	Guilford	Guilford		Mar 21, 1908	$5,750	4 Library St. 45°10′14.63″N 69°22′59.89″W	Designed by Bangor architect Frederick A. Patterson, this building was renovated in 1977 and 2002.
7	Houlton	Houlton		Jan 13, 1903	$10,000	107 Main St. 46°7′32.6″N 67°50′9.39″W	This library was designed by architect John Calvin Stevens of Portland in the Colonial Revival style, and it was renovated in 1968 and 1991.
8	Lewiston	Lewiston		Jan 15, 1901	$60,000	200 Lisbon St. 44°5′44.46″N 70°12′57.33″W	A Coombs and Gibbs design, this building was significantly renovated in 1996, including moving the main entrance one block to the west.
9	Madison	Madison		Jun 2, 1904	$8,000	12 Old Point Ave. 44°47′48.09″N 69°52′47.03″W	This building was designed by the Madison architectural firm of Snow & Humphreys.
10	Milo	Milo		Sep 30, 1908	$8,500	4 Pleasant St. 45°15′12.88″N 68°59′10.02″W	Construction for this Frederick A. Patterson of Bangor design (based largely on Plan F from the leaflet distributed by James Bertram, Carnegie's secretary) did not begin until May 1922.
11	Oakland	Oakland		Feb 15, 1912	$10,000	18 Church St. 44°32′46.56″N 69°43′10.34″W	Designed by Harry S. Coombs, this building was expanded in 2002.
12	Old Town	Old Town		Feb 12, 1903	$10,000	46 Middle St. 44°56′7.45″N 68°38′53.25″W	A neoclassical work by New York architect Albert Randolph Ross, this library was expanded in 1991.
13	Pittsfield	Pittsfield		Mar 20, 1903	$10,000	89 S. Main St. 44°46′55.18″N 69°22′59.75″W	Architect Albert Randolph Ross would later use this Beaux-Arts design for the Warsaw, New York library. A Civil War monument was built to coincide with the building's dedication in 1904.
14	Presque Isle	Presque Isle		May 15, 1906	$10,000	39 2nd St. 46°41′0.13″N 68°0′49.85″W	An addition to this Astle and Page of Houlton work in 1967 significantly changed the look of this library.
15	Rockland	Rockland		Apr 11, 1902	$20,000	80 Union St. 44°6′19.05″N 69°6′43.67″W	Opening April 26, 1904, this Clough and Wardner of Boston-designed library was notably visited by President Taft in 1910.
16	Rumford	Rumford		Jan 22, 1903	$10,000	58 Rumford Ave. 44°32′49.57″N 70°32′56.93″W	Designed by John Calvin Stevens of Portland, this Romanesque Revival building had a large addition completed in 1969.
17	Vinalhaven	Vinalhaven		Apr 22, 1906	$5,200	1 Carver St. 44°2′58.95″N 68°49′52.37″W	This building was dedicated August 15, 1907. Designed by Clough and Wardner of Boston, it is in the Prairie School style.
18	Waterville	Waterville		Apr 28, 1902	$20,000	73 Elm St. 44°33′4.59″N 69°37′55.05″W	The work of Lewiston architect William R. Miller, this building has been renovated twice.

== Academic libraries ==
	Institution	Locality	Image	Year granted	Grant amount	Location	Notes
1	Good Will Home Association	Fairfield		Mar 30, 1905	$15,000	Hinckley campus 44°40′39.68″N 69°38′0.07″W	Designed by Albert Randolph Ross, this library was dedicated May 29, 1907. It is now part of the Good Will-Hinckley campus.
2	University of Maine	Orono		Feb 7, 1905	$55,000	Carnegie Hall; 44°53′52.84″N 68°40′16.12″W	Designed in the Greek Revival style, this building was a library until 1947. It now houses the Virtual Environment and Multimodal Interaction (VEMI) Laboratory.

== See also ==
- List of libraries in the United States
