= Wilton Free Public Library =

- Goodspeed Memorial Library
- U.S. National Register of Historic Places
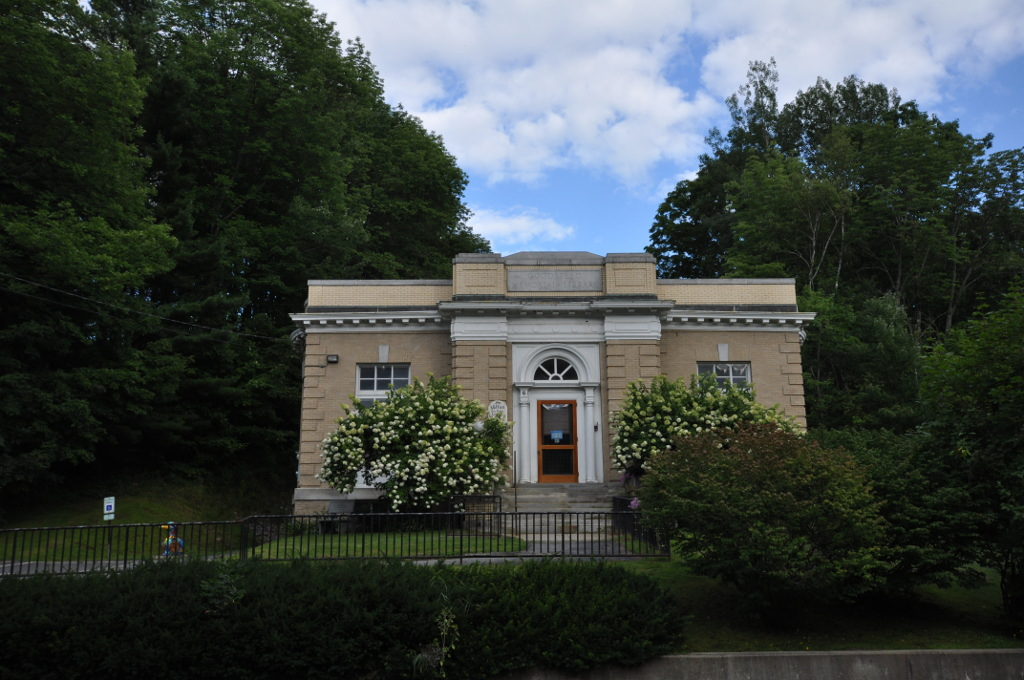

- Location within Maine Location within the United States
- Location: 104 Main Street, Wilton, Maine
- Coordinates: 44°35′16″N 70°13′51″W
- Area: less than one acre
- Architectural style: Classical Revival
- MPS: Maine Public Libraries MPS
- NRHP reference No.: 88003019
- Added to NRHP: January 5, 1989

The Wilton Free Public Library is the public library of Wilton, Maine, United States. It is located at 6 Goodspeed Street, across Wilson Stream from Main Street and just north of the town's central business district. It is located in the Goodspeed Memorial Library, an architecturally distinguished building designed by Harry S. Coombs, which was funded by Agnes Goodspeed and completed in 1916. The building was listed on the National Register of Historic Places in 1989.

== Architecture and history ==
The library building is a single-story Classical Revival building, built out of tan brick. The building is T-shaped, and stands overlooking Main Street across Wilson Stream. The main facade is three bays wide, the central one projecting and providing the main entrance. Brick piers frame the slightly recessed entry, which has slender Tuscan columns on either side, supporting an entablature with a half-round wagon wheel window. A modillioned cornice line is topped by a parapet. The interior of the building features richly detailed woodwork, particularly in the paneled entry hall. A stained glass window decorates the central section, with reading rooms in the flanking wings.

The Wilton Free Public Library was established in 1901 by petition of the town residents, and originally housed in one of the downtown commercial buildings. In 1914 the town received a bequest from the estate of Agnes I. Goodspeed, supplemented by additional donations by her sons, for the construction of this library building, which was dedicated in October 1916. It is one of the later works of Lewiston-based architect Harry S. Coombs.

== See also ==
- National Register of Historic Places listings in Franklin County, Maine
