= Strathglass Building =

- U.S. National Register of Historic Places
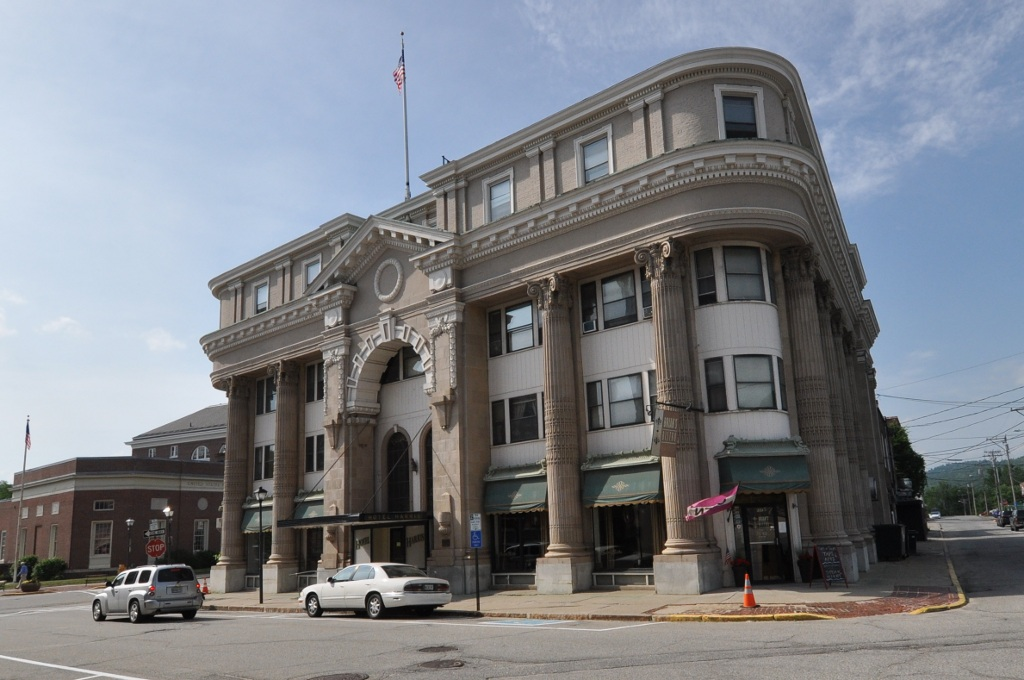

- Location within Maine Location within the United States
- Location: 25 Hartford St., Rumford, Maine
- Coordinates: 44°32′46″N 70°32′45″W
- Area: 0.3 acres (0.12 ha)
- Built: c.1906, 1931
- Architect: Stone, Carpenter & Willson, Coombs & Harriman
- Architectural style: Beaux-Arts Classical, Italian Renaissance Revival
- MPS: Rumford Commercial MRA
- NRHP reference No.: 80000244
- Added to NRHP: May 13, 1980

The Strathglass Building is a historic commercial building at 25 Hartford Street in the central business district of Rumford, Maine. Built c.1906, it is an imposing four-story architect-designed Beaux-Arts building, constructed by Hugh J. Chisholm, Rumford's leading industrialist in the late 19th and early 20th centuries. Later known as the Hotel Harris, it was listed on the National Register of Historic Places in 1980.

== Description and history ==
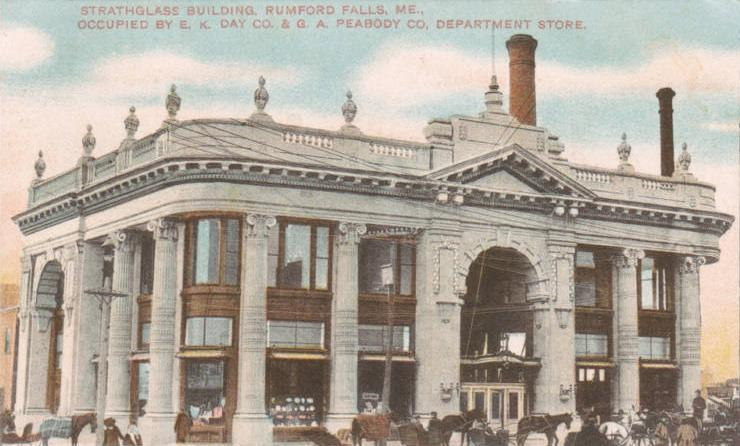
The Strathglass Building, 1906

The building was designed by the architectural firm of Stone, Carpenter & Willson, based in Providence, Rhode Island, and was completed in 1906. It was built for Hugh J. Chisholm, the industrialist responsible for Rumford's development in the late 19th century as a major paper processing center, by Frank Bunker Gilbreth. (Gilbreth built a second building in the small mill town as part of the same contract for the Rumford Falls Power Company.) Chisholm named the building after the river in Scotland which flows near his family's traditional seat. Chisholm also gave the Strathglass name to the Strathglass Park District, an area of high-quality mill worker housing in Rumford.

The Strathglass Building stands on a slightly non-rectangular lot bounded on three sides by Congress, Lowell, and Hartford Streets. It is now a four-story brick structure, with the bays of the first three floors separated by engaged limestone fluted columns. The main entrance is set under a three-story arch supported by square stone piers, and topped by a triangular pediment at the third floor. When originally built, the building only had three stories, and had a concrete balustrade with urns at the visible roofline. this was removed in 1931, when the building was rebuilt after a devastating fire. The interior was gutted, and all that survived intact was the heavy masonry structure. The rebuilding (as the Hotel Harris) was supervised by Lewiston architects Coombs & Harriman. These additions, including the new fourth floor and flamboyant lobby, were Italian Renaissance Revival in style, though later alterations have removed most external detail. The lobby remains.

== See also ==
- National Register of Historic Places listings in Oxford County, Maine
