= Rumford Public Library =

- U.S. National Register of Historic Places
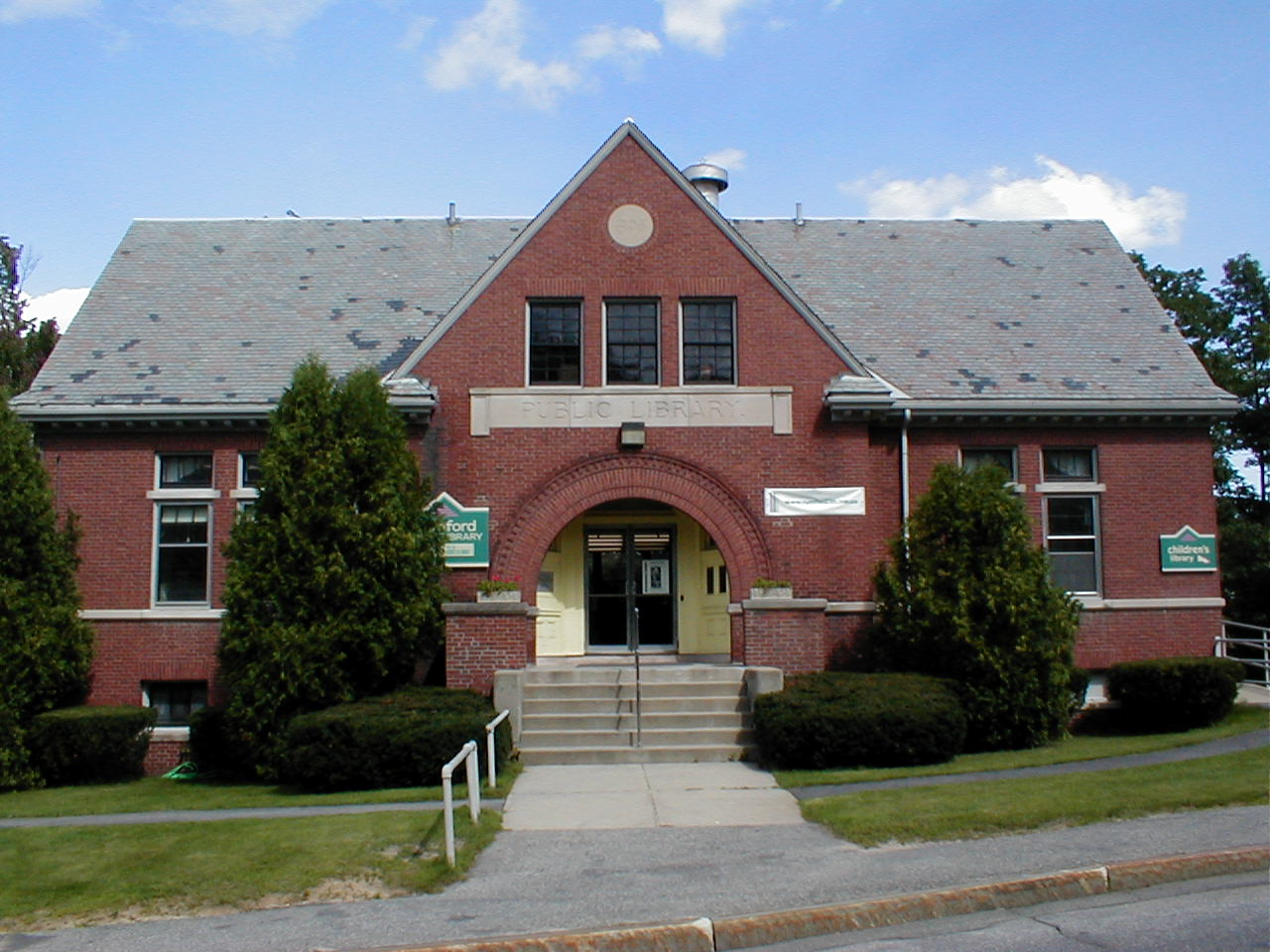

- Location within Maine Location within the United States
- Location: Rumford Ave., Rumford, Maine
- Coordinates: 44°32′49″N 70°32′58″W
- Area: less than one acre
- Built: 1903
- Architect: John Calvin Stevens
- Architectural style: Romanesque
- MPS: Maine Public Libraries MPS
- NRHP reference No.: 88003023
- Added to NRHP: January 5, 1989

The Rumford Public Library is a library in Rumford, Maine. The building it is in was designed by Maine architect John Calvin Stevens and was built with a funding grant from Andrew Carnegie in 1903. The architecturally distinguished building was listed on the National Register of Historic Places in 1989.

== Architecture ==
The original portion of the Rumford library is a 1 1/2-story red brick structure with a side-gable roof. Its Romanesque styling is most pronounced in its projecting entry pavilion, a gable-roofed section centered on the middle third of the main facade that has a large round arch, in which the entrance is recessed. A rectangular stone panel above the arch identifies the building, and there are a trio of sash windows above that, with a small round stone panel near the peak of the gable. A belt course of stone separates the main floor from the raised basement, which is also finished in brick. A modern addition was added to the original block in 1969.

The main entry of the library leads into a vestibule, and then a centrally-positioned circulation desk, with reading rooms to either side, and stacks in the modern addition to the rear. The reading areas are decorated with dark-stained window trim, vertical wainscoting, and a fireplace with a bracketed mantel in the north room.

== History ==
The first library established in the Rumford area was a private circulating collection of 1,000 volumes established by A. Z. Cates. A campaign for a permanent public library was enhanced by a $10,000 grant from the Carnegie Foundation in 1903, with the gift of shelving and books by local industrialist Hugh J. Chisholm. The library building was designed by the Portland architect John Calvin Stevens, who designed a number of public library buildings throughout the state.

== See also ==
- List of Carnegie libraries in Maine
- National Register of Historic Places listings in Oxford County, Maine
