= Norway Historic District =

Historic district in Maine, United States

- U.S. National Register of Historic Places
- U.S. Historic district
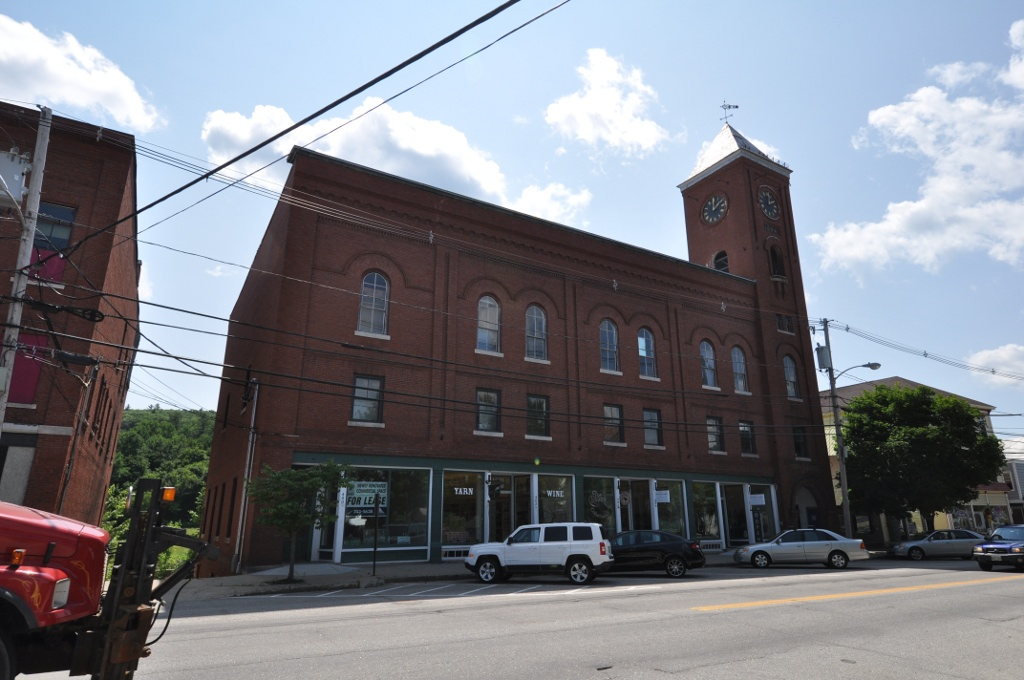
- Norway Opera House

- Location within Maine Location within the United States
- Location: Roughly bounded by Pearl St., Danforth St. and Greenleaf Ave., Pennesseewassee Stream, and Main and Whitman Sts., Norway, Maine
- Coordinates: 44°12′48″N 70°32′27″W
- Area: 44 acres (18 ha)
- Built: 1894
- Architect: Lewis, E.E.; Et al.
- Architectural style: Queen Anne, Italianate, Romanesque
- NRHP reference No.: 88000391
- Added to NRHP: July 21, 1988

The Norway Historic District encompasses most of the historic village center of Norway, Maine, and is reflective of the town's growth over 150 years. Although significant early-to-mid 19th century buildings survive in the village, it was significantly damaged by a major fire in 1894, resulting in the construction of a number of new brick and wood-frame buildings. The district, which is 44 acres (18 ha) in size, includes 64 historically significant residential, civic, social, and commercial buildings, and was listed on the National Register of Historic Places in 1988.

== Description and history ==
The town of Norway, Maine, was incorporated in 1797, having been settled in the late 1780s. The village center grew on the north side of Pennesseewassee Stream, and is arrayed along Main Street, now designated Maine State Routes 117 and 118, east of a crossing of that stream. Side streets running perpendicular to Main Street are populated with housing, while Main Street is the focus of civic, commercial, and social activity. The major focal points of the district are the Universalist Church, at 45 Main Street, and the Norway Opera House, a brick structure with tower at 219 Main Street. The church was built in 1829, and renovated in the 1860s, giving it its present Italianate styling. The Opera House was built in 1894 in the wake of a devastating fire in May 1894, and became an anchor of the village.

In addition to the Opera House, the village was home to a significant number of fraternal social organizations. The Knights of Pythias and International Order of Odd Fellows both built meeting halls in the village, as did the locally unique Weary Club, a social organization for the elderly. The principal civic buildings in the district are a small c. 1866 schoolhouse, the post office, and the library, the latter two being the two main representatives of Depression-era architecture.

The residential architecture of the district is mainly 19th century in age. Notable houses include the Asa Danforth House (1830) at 136 Main Street, which is one of the finest brick Federal period houses in western Maine, the James Crooker House (c. 1860–65) at 19 Deering Street, which is a late example of Greek Revival architecture, and the Stephen and Edward Collins House (c. 1886), an architect designed Queen Anne Victorian at 9 Whitman Street. A notable 20th-century house is the Colonial Revival Edward Cummings House at 54 Deering Street, built in 1924 for a member of Norway's leading industrialists.

== See also ==
- National Register of Historic Places listings in Oxford County, Maine
