= Oakland Public Library (Oakland, Maine) =

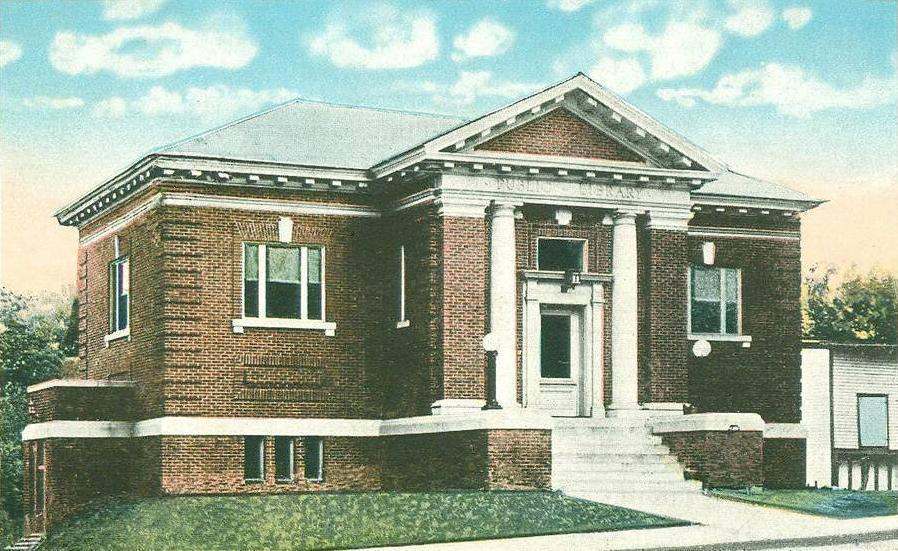
- Location: 18 Church St., Oakland, Maine, United States
- Type: Public
- Established: 1915
- Architect: Harry S. Coombs

Collection
- Size: 33,000

Access and use
- Circulation: 28,000
- Population served: 6,240

Other information
- Budget: $134,659
- Employees: 3
- Oakland Public Library
- U.S. National Register of Historic Places
- Location within Maine Location within the United States
- Location: 18 Church St., Oakland, Maine
- Coordinates: 44°32′47″N 69°43′11″W
- Area: less than one acre
- Built: 1915
- Architect: Coombs, Harry S.
- Architectural style: Classical Revival
- MPS: Maine Public Libraries MPS
- NRHP reference No.: 00000375
- Added to NRHP: April 14, 2000

The Oakland Public Library, serving the town of Oakland, Maine, is located at 18 Church Street, in an architecturally distinguished building designed by Harry S. Coombs in Classical Revival style and built in 1915. It was listed on the National Register of Historic Places in 2000. The library underwent a major renovation and expansion in 2003.

== Architecture and history ==
The Oakland Public Library stands on the east side of Church Street in Oakland's central village. It is a handsome Classical Revival single-story brick building, covered by a hip roof. Its front is three bays wide, with a projecting entry vestibule. Stairs lead up to a recessed entrance, flanked by concrete columns and wide brick corner pilasters. This is topped by a full modillioned pediment, whose cornice detail encircles the building. The windows in the side bays have three sections, with a bracketed sill.

Oakland's library was founded in 1891, and was originally located in Memorial Hall. By 1911, it had outgrown the space available there, and a local businessman petitioned Andrew Carnegie for a grant to build a dedicated building. Carnegie rejected the first request, apparently under the mistaken apprehension that the Memorial Hall space was sufficient for the library's needs. In 1912, he acceded to make a grant, provided the town would ensure its maintenance. The Carnegie Foundation and the town committee then had further exchanges related to the building's design, and it was not until 1914 that the plans of architect Harry S. Coombs were finally approved. Land for the new library was donated by Alice Benjamin and it was completed in 1915. Built to house 4,000 volumes, the collection had grown by the 1990s to more than 16,000 books. In 2003, the size of the library was doubled, providing handicap accessibility and improved parking.

== See also ==
- National Register of Historic Places listings in Kennebec County, Maine
- List of Carnegie libraries in Maine
