= Fort Fairfield Public Library =

- U.S. National Register of Historic Places
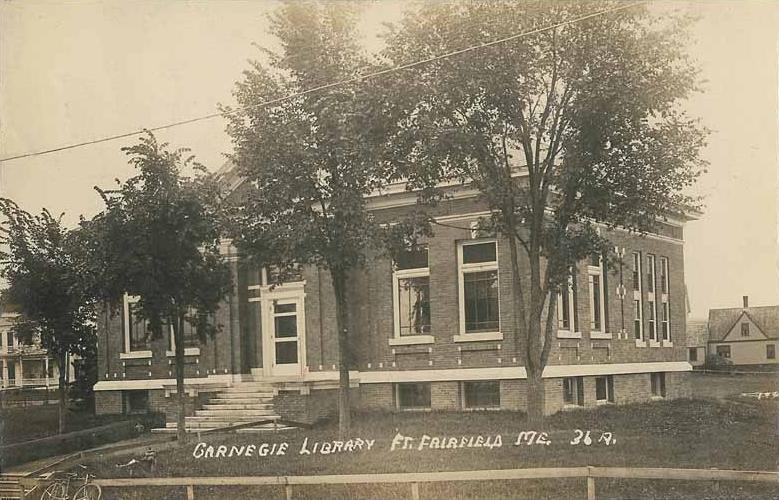

- Location within Maine Location within the United States
- Location: 339 Main Street, Fort Fairfield, Maine
- Coordinates: 46°46′20″N 67°50′4″W
- Area: less than one acre
- Built: 1912
- Built by: R.J. Noyes
- Architect: Harry Coombs
- Architectural style: Classical Revival
- MPS: Maine Public Libraries MPS
- NRHP reference No.: 88003021
- Added to NRHP: January 5, 1989

The Fort Fairfield Public Library, located at 339 Main Street, is the public library of Fort Fairfield, Maine, United States. Fort Fairfield had a private library as early as 1880. It became a town-supported library in 1894 with a circulation of 300 books. In 1911 the town received a grant of $10,000 from Andrew Carnegie - making it one of the seventeen Carnegie libraries in the state of Maine. The building was designed by Lewiston architect Harry Coombs, and built by R.J. Noyes of Augusta. The Fort Fairfield Public Library was completed and officially opened on September 9, 1913.

In 1925 Colonel Franklin Drew, from Lewiston, who regarded Fort Fairfield's public library as one of the best in the state, donated his personal library to it. The Drew Room, where the genealogy records, town reports dating back to the late 1800s, the Fort Fairfield Review, and the Fort Fairfield Journal are kept, are named after his father, Jessie Drew.

It was added to the National Register of Historic Places in 1989. In 1994-5 an addition was added as a community room to be used for the benefit of the inhabitants in Fort Fairfield, local clubs and organizations. It also features the children's room, the librarian's office and bathroom, which are all handicap accessible. The community room was used as a temporary town office during the 1994 flood.

In 2007, a decision was made to computerize the library's collection. 14,000 books were entered into computers for the librarian's and library patrons' use. The library had approximately 18,000 books, audio books, VHS & DVD movies, as well as 20 periodicals and 4 newspapers.

== See also ==
- National Register of Historic Places listings in Aroostook County, Maine
- List of Carnegie libraries in Maine
