= National Register of Historic Places listings in Franklin County, Maine =

Location of Franklin County in Maine

This is a list of the National Register of Historic Places listings in Franklin County, Maine.

This is intended to be a complete list of the properties and districts on the National Register of Historic Places in Franklin County, Maine, United States. Latitude and longitude coordinates are provided for many National Register properties and districts; these locations may be seen together in a map.

There are 52 properties and districts listed on the National Register in the county. Two properties were once listed, but have been removed.

This National Park Service list is complete through NPS recent listings posted June 6, 2026.

Contents: Counties and municipalities in Maine
Androscoggin - Aroostook - Cumberland (City of Portland) - Franklin - Hancock - Kennebec - Knox - Lincoln - Oxford - Penobscot - Piscataquis - Sagadahoc - Somerset - Waldo - Washington - York

== Current listings ==
	Name on the Register	Image	Date listed	Location	City or town	Description
1	Arnold Trail to Quebec	Arnold Trail to Quebec	October 1, 1969 (#69000018)	Along the Kennebec River, through Wayman and Flagstaff lakes along the Dead River and Chain of Ponds to Quebec; 44°40′49″N 69°59′18″W	Coburn Gore	Extends through Franklin, Kennebec, Sagadahoc, and Somerset counties
2	Barn on Lot 8, Range G	Barn on Lot 8, Range G	August 24, 2011 (#11000581)	816 Foster Hill Rd. 44°51′29″N 70°13′20″W	Freeman Township	
3	Bass Boarding House	Bass Boarding House	April 7, 1988 (#88000396)	Canal St. 44°35′12″N 70°13′58″W	Wilton	Now the Wilton Farm and Home Museum.
4	Ora Blanchard House	Ora Blanchard House	January 15, 1980 (#80000215)	Main St. 45°08′32″N 70°26′42″W	Stratton	
5	John G. Coburn Farm	John G. Coburn Farm	April 11, 2002 (#02000347)	434 Carthage Road (Route 162), just north of the Webb River; 44°37′36″N 70°28′36″W	Carthage	Mis-listed as "John G. Coburn", on River Road.
6	Coplin Plantation Schoolhouse	Coplin Plantation Schoolhouse	September 11, 1997 (#97001132)	State Route 16 approximately 4.5 miles southwest of its junction with State Route 27; 45°05′32″N 70°29′55″W	Coplin Plantation	
7	Cutler Memorial Library	Cutler Memorial Library	November 2, 1973 (#73000104)	Academy and High Sts. 44°40′09″N 70°08′55″W	Farmington	
8	Farmington Historic District	Farmington Historic District	January 20, 1995 (#94001551)	Roughly bounded by High, Academy, Anson, and Grove Sts. 44°40′14″N 70°08′58″W	Farmington	Boundary decrease (listed 4/27/2010)
9	First Congregational Church, United Church of Christ	First Congregational Church, United Church of Christ	July 25, 1974 (#74000149)	235 Main St. 44°40′04″N 70°09′00″W	Farmington	
10	Franklin County Courthouse	Franklin County Courthouse	October 6, 1983 (#83003641)	Main and Anson Sts. 44°40′17″N 70°09′08″W	Farmington	
11	Franklin Grange #124		March 17, 2025 (#100011542)	32 South Main Street; 44°22′48″N 70°38′38″W	Woodstock	
12	Free Will Baptist Meetinghouse	Free Will Baptist Meetinghouse	August 28, 1973 (#73000264)	219 Main St. 44°40′08″N 70°09′03″W	Farmington	Now a garage.
13	Goodridge Corner School		March 21, 2025 (#100011556)	1438 Industry Road; 44°43′14″N 70°03′24″W	Industry	
14	Goodspeed Memorial Library	Goodspeed Memorial Library	January 5, 1989 (#88003019)	104 Main St. 44°35′16″N 70°13′51″W	Wilton	
15	Greenacre	Greenacre	October 29, 1982 (#82000422)	17 Court St. 44°40′24″N 70°08′53″W	Farmington	
16	Isabel and Chester Greenwood House	Isabel and Chester Greenwood House	July 12, 1978 (#78000160)	112 Hill Street; 44°39′39″N 70°08′52″W	Farmington	
17	The Herbert	The Herbert	March 26, 2018 (#100002226)	246 Main St. 44°57′31″N 70°09′16″W	Kingfield	
18	Holmes-Crafts Homestead	Holmes-Crafts Homestead	April 26, 1973 (#73000105)	Old N. Jay Rd. on State Route 4; 44°31′08″N 70°13′28″W	North Jay	Owned by the local historical society.
19	Frank Hutchins House	Frank Hutchins House	December 29, 1986 (#86003532)	High St. 44°57′27″N 70°09′17″W	Kingfield	Home to the local historical society.
20	Jay-Niles Memorial Library	Jay-Niles Memorial Library	March 13, 1987 (#87000414)	State Route 4; 44°32′53″N 70°14′17″W	North Jay	
21	Little Red Schoolhouse	Little Red Schoolhouse	February 23, 1972 (#72000070)	Franklin Agricultural Society Fairgrounds; 44°39′46″N 70°08′23″W	Farmington	Originally on Wilton Road; moved to fairgrounds in 2007.
22	Madrid Village Schoolhouse	Madrid Village Schoolhouse	December 14, 1995 (#95001460)	Western side of Reeds Mills Rd., 0.05 miles north of its junction with State Route 4; 44°51′53″N 70°27′45″W	Madrid	
23	Maine Woods Office	Maine Woods Office	November 10, 1980 (#80000216)	Main St. 44°49′27″N 70°20′55″W	Phillips	Now the Phillips Community House.
24	McCleary Farm	McCleary Farm	April 7, 1989 (#89000253)	S. Strong Rd. 44°45′50″N 70°12′34″W	Strong	
25	Merrill Hall	Merrill Hall	January 23, 1980 (#80000217)	Maine and Academy Sts. 44°40′09″N 70°08′58″W	Farmington	
26	Morrill Homestead		April 12, 2022 (#100007580)	17 Lucy Knowles Rd. 44°37′08″N 70°04′33″W	Chesterville	
27	New Sharon Congregational Church	New Sharon Congregational Church	June 20, 1985 (#85001261)	State Route 134; 44°38′10″N 70°00′50″W	New Sharon	
28	Nordica Homestead	Nordica Homestead	December 23, 1969 (#69000006)	North of Farmington on Holly Rd. off State Route 27; 44°41′42″N 70°08′43″W	Farmington	Now a museum.
29	North Jay Grange Store	North Jay Grange Store	October 23, 1974 (#74000150)	State Route 17; 44°33′15″N 70°14′09″W	North Jay	
30	William F. Norton House	William F. Norton House	July 8, 1982 (#82000741)	1 Stanley Ave. 44°57′39″N 70°09′06″W	Kingfield	
31	Old Union Meetinghouse	Old Union Meetinghouse	October 30, 1973 (#73000106)	U.S. Route 2; 44°37′26″N 70°04′40″W	Farmington	
32	Oquossoc Log Church	Oquossoc Log Church	July 19, 1984 (#84001368)	State Route 4; 44°58′00″N 70°46′14″W	Rangeley	
33	Orgone Energy Observatory	Orgone Energy Observatory	January 29, 1999 (#98001602)	Western side of Dodge Pond Rd., 0.65 miles north of the junction of State Routes 4/16; 44°58′54″N 70°43′05″W	Rangeley	Now the William/Wilhelm Reich Museum.
34	Phillips High School		March 23, 2021 (#100006335)	96 Main St. 44°49′27″N 70°20′39″W	Phillips	
35	Porter-Bell-Brackley Estate	Porter-Bell-Brackley Estate	November 10, 1980 (#80000218)	Lower Main St. 44°48′16″N 70°13′14″W	Strong	
36	Hiram Ramsdell House	Hiram Ramsdell House	December 4, 1973 (#73000107)	High and Perham Sts. 44°40′17″N 70°08′59″W	Farmington	
37	Rangeley Lakes Country Club Historic District		August 30, 2024 (#100010815)	43 and 50-56 Country Club Road; 44°57′41″N 70°41′24″W	Rangeley	
38	Rangeley Tavern	Rangeley Tavern	March 22, 2018 (#100002227)	2443 Main St. 44°57′49″N 70°38′27″W	Rangeley	
39	Rangeley Trust Company Building	Rangeley Trust Company Building	July 13, 1989 (#89000846)	Main St. 44°57′50″N 70°38′32″W	Rangeley	Now the local historical society museum.
40	Rangeley Public Library	Rangeley Public Library	July 12, 1978 (#78000161)	Lake St. 44°57′53″N 70°38′38″W	Rangeley	
41	Reeds Mill Church		June 8, 2026 (#100013106)	995 Reeds Mill Road; 44°53′13″N 70°24′46″W	Madrid	
42	Salem Town House (Former)	Salem Town House (Former)	August 5, 2005 (#05000795)	State Route 142; 44°54′05″N 70°16′35″W	Salem	
43	Temple Intervale School	Temple Intervale School	February 8, 1985 (#85000240)	Temple Intervale; 44°41′54″N 70°14′45″W	Temple	
44	Thompson's Bridge	Thompson's Bridge	March 22, 1991 (#91000321)	Over Thompson's Creek off the northern side of State Route 43 at the Franklin-Somerset county line 44°43′36″N 70°00′25″W	Allen's Mills	
45	Tufts House	Tufts House	May 8, 1979 (#79000130)	Southeast of Farmington on U.S. Route 2; 44°38′10″N 70°05′35″W	Farmington	
46	Union Church	Union Church	July 13, 1989 (#89000844)	Main and Pleasant Sts. 44°49′24″N 70°20′23″W	Phillips	
47	Upper Dallas School	Upper Dallas School	February 9, 1990 (#89002345)	Saddleback Rd. 44°57′55″N 70°36′08″W	Dallas Plantation	
48	U.S. Inspection Station-Coburn Gore, Maine	U.S. Inspection Station-Coburn Gore, Maine	September 10, 2014 (#14000558)	ME 27; 45°22′43″N 70°48′25″W	Coburn Gore	
49	Webb River Grange		June 24, 2024 (#100010455)	112 Main Street; 44°37′45″N 70°27′08″W	Carthage	
50	Weld Town Hall	Weld Town Hall	June 27, 2007 (#07000597)	17 School St. 44°41′51″N 70°25′12″W	Weld	
51	Capt. Joel Whitney House	Capt. Joel Whitney House	April 22, 2003 (#03000293)	8 Pleasant St. 44°49′22″N 70°20′24″W	Phillips	Home to the Phillips Historical Society.
52	Amos G. Winter House	Amos G. Winter House	May 3, 1976 (#76000191)	Winter's Hill off State Route 27; 44°57′33″N 70°09′37″W	Kingfield	

== Former listings ==
	Name on the Register	Image	Date listed	Date removed	Location	City or town	Description
1	Jacob Abbott House	Jacob Abbott House	November 26, 1973 (#73000103)	April 27, 2010	State Route 27; 44°39′56″N 70°08′52″W	Farmington	
2	New Sharon Bridge	New Sharon Bridge	September 24, 1999 (#99001189)	July 14, 2015	South of U.S. Route 2 over the Sandy River; 44°38′16″N 70°00′56″W	New Sharon	Demolished on February 27, 2014.

== See also ==
- List of National Historic Landmarks in Maine
- National Register of Historic Places listings in Maine
