= John G. Coburn Farm =

Historic house in Maine, United States

- John G. Coburn
- U.S. National Register of Historic Places
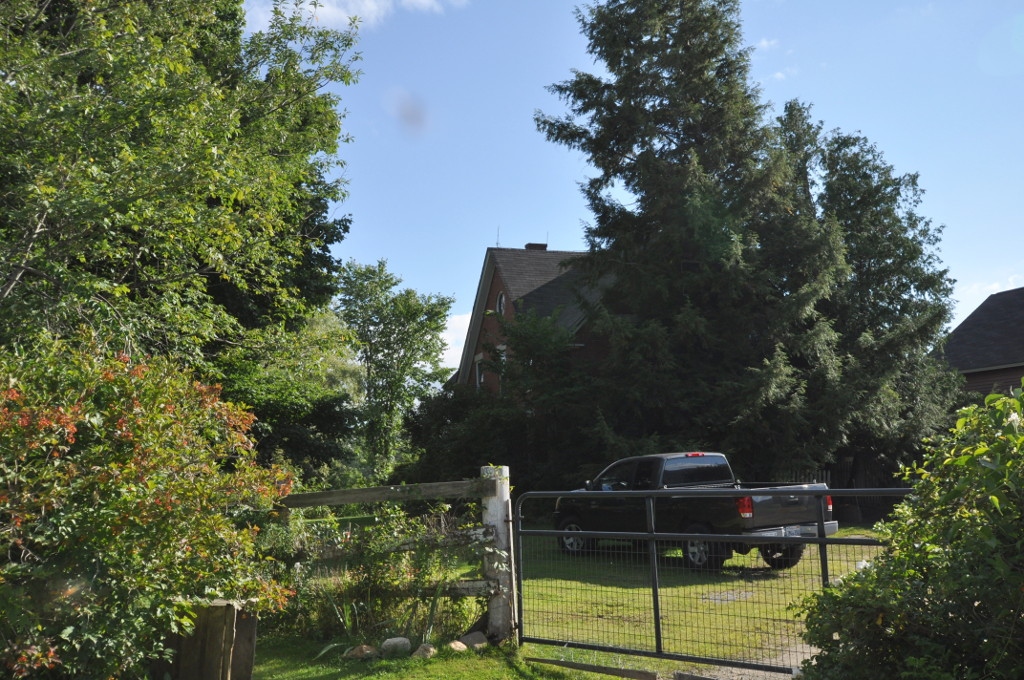

- Location within Maine Location within the United States
- Location: 434 Carthage Rd., Carthage, Maine
- Coordinates: 44.62607°N 70.47452°W
- Area: 29 acres (12 ha)
- Built: 1824
- Architectural style: Greek Revival
- NRHP reference No.: 02000347
- Added to NRHP: April 11, 2002

The John G. Coburn Farm is a historic farmstead at 434 Carthage Road (Maine State Route 142) in Carthage, Maine. The farmhouse, a two-story brick structure built in 1824, stands on the west side of the road just north of its crossing of the Webb River. The house is regionally distinctive as the only brick building in the Webb River valley. The farm, which now includes 29 acres (12 ha), also includes two English barns, one of which has been dated to the early 19th century. The farm was listed on the National Register of Historic Places (erroneously as "John G. Coburn" on River Road) in 2002.

== Description ==
The main block of the house is a two-story rectangle running parallel to the road, with an integral single-story ell extending to the southwest. A timber-frame carriage shed is attached to the ell. As originally built in 1824, it was a typical late Federal/early Greek Revival center hall structure, with rooms on both floors flanking a central hallway. In 1865 the gable roof was altered, adding a cross gable projecting on the front facade. In this gable end there are three sash windows, and a small stained-glass oculus window at the peak. The interior of the house largely reflects decoration and alterations dating to the turn of the 20th century.

The two barns stand near each other north of the house. The older of the two barns is the larger one, with original hay lofts; part of its roof supports has been rebuilt using modern construction methods. The smaller barn apparently once stood closer to the house, where an appropriately-size granite foundation remains. A leanto for sheltering farm animals is attached to one side.

== History ==
The main house was built in 1824 by Oliver Newman, Sr., who arrived in Carthage (settled 1812) in 1823, and amassed a substantial farm property over the next 30 years. Oliver Jr. next occupied the house, and was responsible for the addition of the cross gable and other interior alterations to the house. He was not as successful as his father, and the property was briefly sold out of the family in 1870. By 1880 Osca Newman Coburn and her husband John had acquired the property, bringing it back into the Newman family. It remained in the hands of the Coburns and their descendants until 1973.

== See also ==
- National Register of Historic Places listings in Franklin County, Maine
