= Capt. Joel Whitney House =

Historic house in Maine, United States

- U.S. National Register of Historic Places
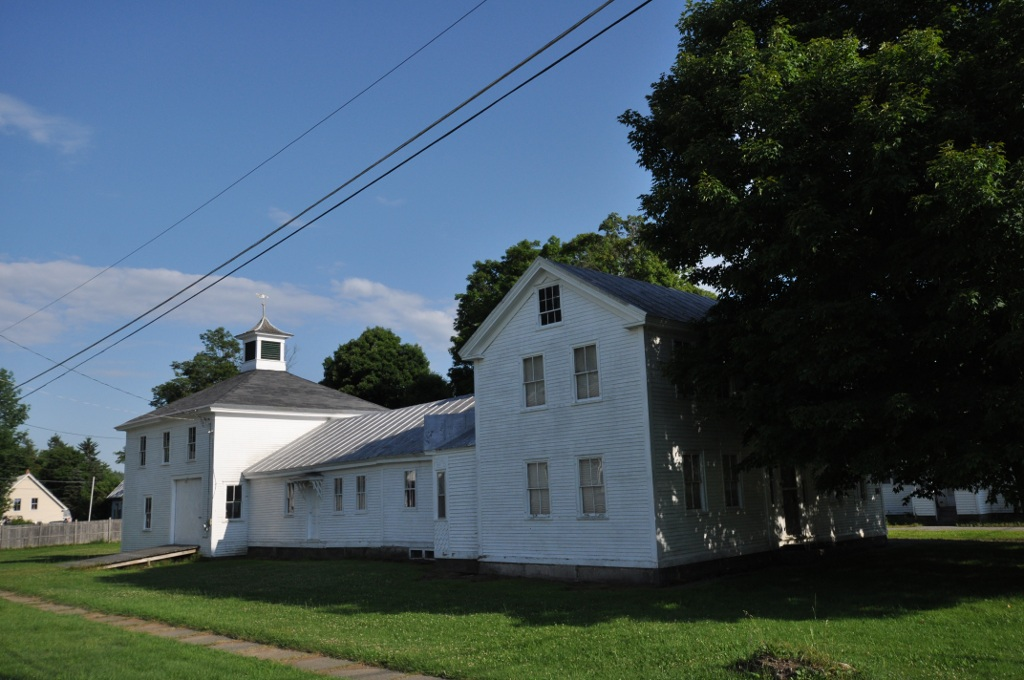

- Location within Maine Location within the United States
- Location: 8 Pleasant St., Phillips, Maine
- Coordinates: 44°49′22″N 70°20′24″W
- Area: 0.4 acres (0.16 ha)
- Built: 1829
- Built by: Ladd, Jesse
- Architectural style: Federal, Italianate
- NRHP reference No.: 03000293
- Added to NRHP: April 22, 2003

The Capt. Joel Whitney House is a historic house at 8 Pleasant Street in Phillips, Maine. Built in 1829 for a prominent early settler and businessman, it is one of the oldest houses in the small inland community, and probably the only two-story building of that age. It is now owned by the Phillips Historical Society, which houses museum displays in the rear sections. The house was listed on the National Register of Historic Places in 2003.

== Description and history ==
The Whitney House is set at the southeast corner of Pleasant and Sawyer Streets, opposite Sawyer Street from the Union Church. The house is a rambling structure, with a 2 1/2-story side-gable main block, a long single-story ell extending to the rear, which joins to a square two-story carriage house with a cupola-topped hip roof. The main facade is five bays wide, with a central entrance flanked by sidelight windows and topped by a wooden fan set in an elaborate entablature in the Federal style. The rear ell was built in two stages, the first being integral to the house construction and the second added later. The carriage house has large sliding doors on two sides, with a large hay portal over the southern entrance. The interior of the main house has retained much of its original Federal period woodwork and hardware; the rear sections have been adapted for use as display, meeting, and library spaces by the historical society.

The town of Phillips was incorporated in 1812. Captain Joel Whitney arrived with his family sometime between 1806 and 1815, bought 160 acres (65 ha) of land, and soon became a man of local prominence. Lands he owned became part of Phillips village, he operated a saw mill and potash factory, and he served as an early postmaster. He donated the land for the adjacent Union Church, helped finance its construction, and donated the bell in its tower. This house was built for Whitney in 1829 by Jesse Ladd, a local housewright, some of whose other houses have survived. This is the only known two-story house of the period to survive in Phillips—all the others are 1 1/2-story Capes.

== See also ==
- National Register of Historic Places listings in Franklin County, Maine
