= Barn on Lot 8, Range G =

- U.S. National Register of Historic Places
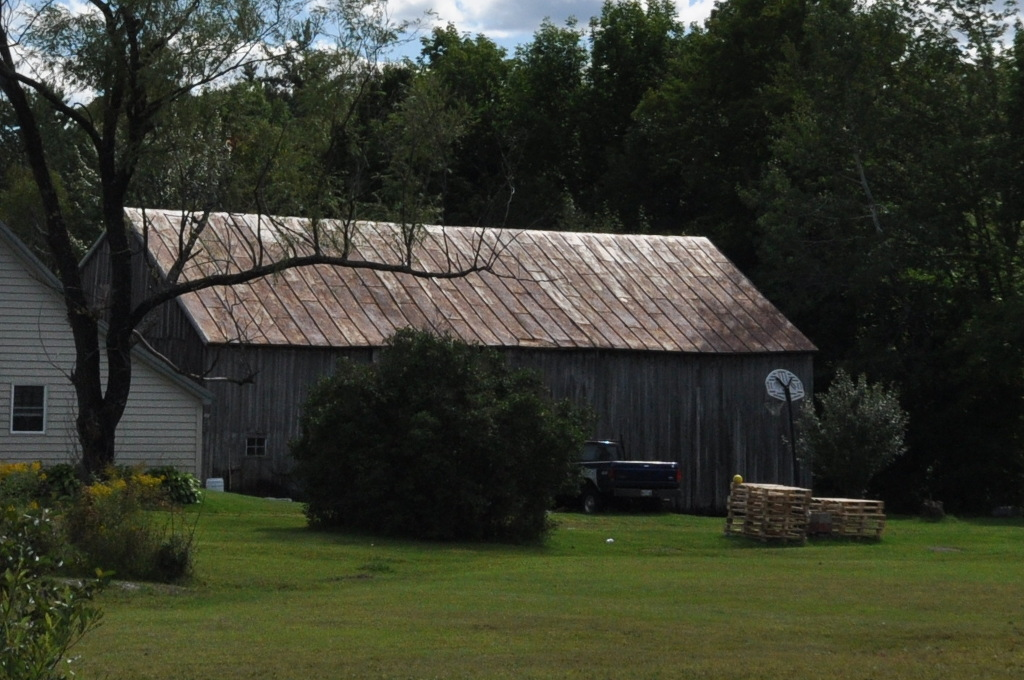

- Location within Maine Location within the United States
- Location: 816 Foster Hill Road, Freeman Township, Maine
- Coordinates: 44°53′17.6″N 70°13′5.2″W
- Area: less than one acre
- Built: c. 1825, 1899
- NRHP reference No.: 11000581
- Added to NRHP: August 24, 2011

The Barn on Lot 8, Range G is a historic barn in rural Franklin County, Maine. The barn was built in two stages, the first estimated to be around 1825, the second in 1899. It exhibits an architecturally distinctive solution to issues surrounding the expansion of a traditional English barn. The barn was listed on the National Register of Historic Places in 2011.

== Setting ==
The barn is located on the west side of Foster Hill Road (Maine State Route 145), in Freeman Township, a former town about 15 miles (24 km) north of Farmington which was incorporated in 1803 and disincorporated in 1934. The property on which the barn stands has uncertain ownership prior to 1825, and has always been referred to in property records as Lot 8, Range G. The barn stands behind a 1 1/2-story wood frame Cape style house which also appears to date to the first half of the 19th century, whose historical integrity has been compromised by alterations including the application of modern siding. The buildings are surrounded by several acres of fields and former orchard, beyond which lie woods.

== Description ==
The barn is a rectangular structure about 65 feet (20 m) long and 36 feet (11 m) wide, with a gable roof. It is oriented east–west, perpendicular to the road. The eastern section of the barn, measuring 46 feet (14 m) in length, is a traditional English barn built c. 1825, with some modest modifications made to accommodate the western section, which was added in 1899. The original entrance to the older portion is roughly centered on that section's north face, and is a sliding door 12 feet (3.7 m) wide. A second, hinged doorway is in the western gable in the new section. There are two pedestrian entrances on the east face, and there is irregular fenestration on the east, south, and west faces. The exterior of the walls is clad in vertical sheathing which is probably a 20th-century replacement. The barn's roof is steel.

The interior of the barn clearly shows the two sections of the barn. The older portion is built using hand-hewn timbers and scribe-rule joinery, while the newer portion uses sawn timbers and square-rule joinery. It is basically oriented with a north–south aisle separating three bays on either side. The central bay on the west side has been adapted to serve as a passage into the new portion, whose bays run east-to-west. In order to accommodate this addition. two of the older barn's main supports were relocated to either side of this new passage. This type of alteration had, as of this barn's National Register nomination in 2011, not been seen elsewhere in Maine. A more typical process of expanding an English barn in rural New England was to simply build a second English barn and attach it to the first, but this resulted in two separate aisles. A second common method was to reorient the old barn's doors to the gable ends, reorienting all of the central posts to accommodate the new central aisle. In this barn, only one side was altered, creating an internal T-shaped aisle layout.

== See also ==
- National Register of Historic Places listings in Franklin County, Maine
