= Madrid Village Schoolhouse =

- U.S. National Register of Historic Places
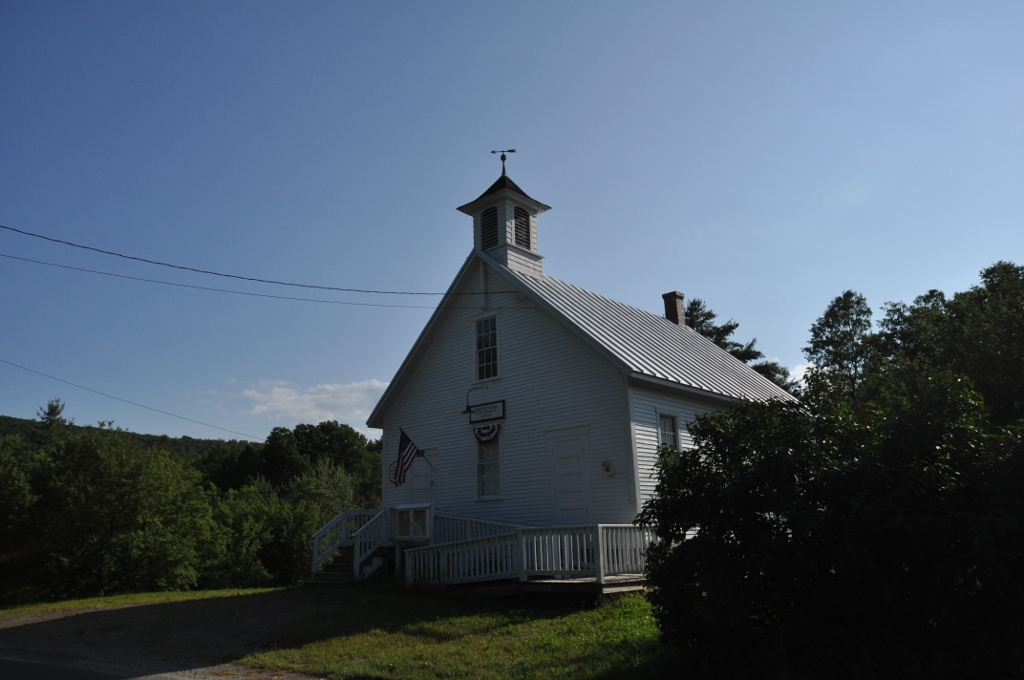

- Location within Maine Location within the United States
- Location: Reeds Mills Rd. W side, 0.05 mi. N of jct. with ME 4, Madrid, Maine
- Coordinates: 44°51′53″N 70°27′45″W
- Area: less than one acre
- Built: 1872
- Architectural style: Late Victorian
- NRHP reference No.: 95001460
- Added to NRHP: December 14, 1995

The Madrid Village Schoolhouse is a historic community building on Reeds Mill Road in the center of the disincorporated township of Madrid, Maine. Built c. 1872, it is the least-altered surviving district school building of twelve originally built in the community. In the later years of the 20th century the school was used for town meetings and offices prior to the town's disincorporation in 2000. The building was listed on the National Register of Historic Places in 1995.

== Description and history ==
The schoolhouse is a single story wood frame structure, three bays wide, with a gable roof, weatherboard siding, and a rubblestone foundation. The main facade, facing east, has a central window flanked by two doorways, with a second window centered in the gable end. The doors and windows have simple trim. A remnant of a vertical flag pole extends upward from the upper window to the ridge line just below the small bell tower. The building is set on a sloping lot, exposing the basement in the rear, and there is a two-story ell there, which provides pit toilet facilities for the building. The two entries lead into separate vestibules, which lead into a single large chamber, which takes up the rest of the main block. These rooms are finished with horizontal pine wainscoting, and 20th-century wooden floors. Original blackboards are found on two walls. The basement of the building has modern finishes.

The town of Madrid was settled in 1807 and incorporated in 1836. Its population peaked around 1860, at which time it had seven school districts and twelve schools. The property on which this building is believed to stand was sold to the town in 1872, and it is presumed that the school was built on it not long after (there is no evidence of other relevant property acquisitions by the town in the vicinity). The building was the last of the town's schools, operating until 1959. It was thereafter used as town hall, housing offices and the town polling station. The town disincorporated in 2000, and the building is now maintained by the Madrid Historical Society.

== See also ==
- National Register of Historic Places listings in Franklin County, Maine
