= Jay-Niles Memorial Library =

- U.S. National Register of Historic Places
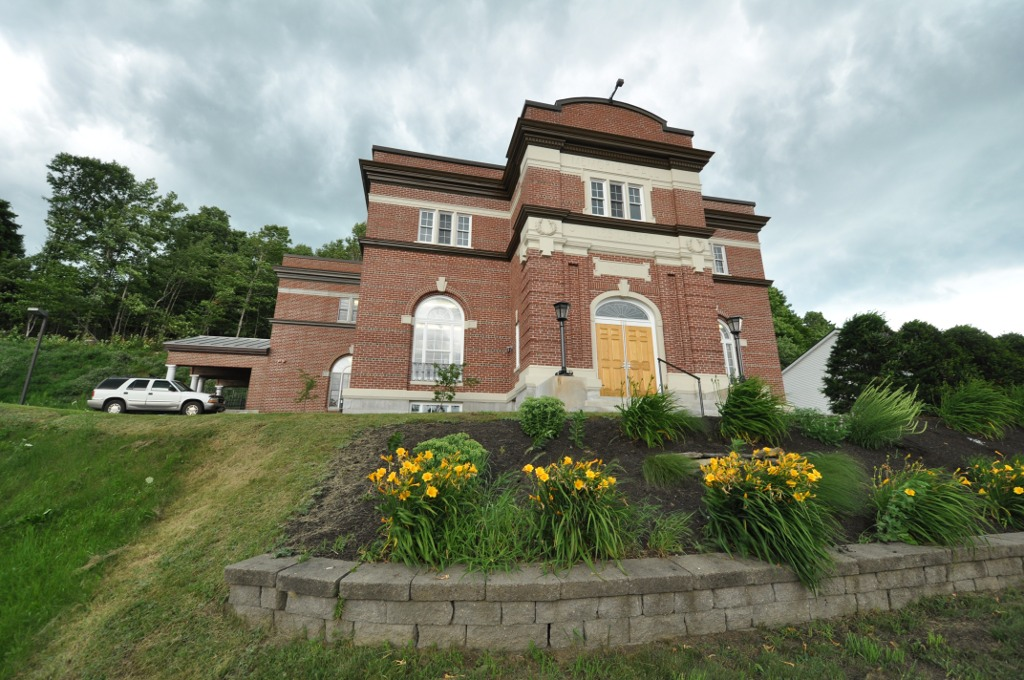

- Location within Maine Location within the United States
- Location: Maine State Route 4, North Jay, Maine
- Coordinates: 44°32′53″N 70°14′17″W
- Area: less than one acre
- Built: 1916
- Architect: Prescott and Sidebottom, Architects
- Architectural style: Classical Revival
- NRHP reference No.: 87000414
- Added to NRHP: March 13, 1987

The Jay-Niles Memorial Library or Niles Memorial Library is the public library of Jay, Maine. It is located on Maine State Route 4 in an architecturally distinguished Colonial Revival building, built in 1916-18 as a memorial to Veranus and Mehitable Niles and the town's Civil War soldiers. The building was added to the National Register of Historic Places in 1987.

== Architecture and history ==
The Jay-Niles Library is a two-story brick building, set on a terraced knoll overlooking Maine State Route 4 in North Jay. It is a basically rectangular structure, with projecting entrance sections to the west and north. The main (west-facing) facade is three bays wide, the projection flanked by large round-arch windows on the first floor and groups of three sash windows on the second. The projecting vestibule has a double door with a semi-elliptical fanlight window above at its center, flanked by paneled brick pilasters, and with brick corner quoining. A broad entablature separates the first and second levels and is incised with the library's name. The center bay above the entrance also has triple sash windows. A cornice gives way to a parapet above, and the vestibule has a crown in the parapet.

The village of North Jay is documented to have had a subscription library established c. 1850, although it is not known how long this service lasted. The present building is the result of efforts by two brothers, Louville and S. H. Niles, to memorialize their parents, Veranus and Mehitable Niles, both longtime residents of Jay who died in 1893. It was built in 1916-18 to a design by Prescott and Sidebottom, and memorializes both the Nileses and Jay's soldiers in the American Civil War. The library remained active until the 1970s, when it was closed for a time, reopening in 1980 with the town's support.

== See also ==
- National Register of Historic Places listings in Franklin County, Maine
