= North Jay Grange Store =

- U.S. National Register of Historic Places
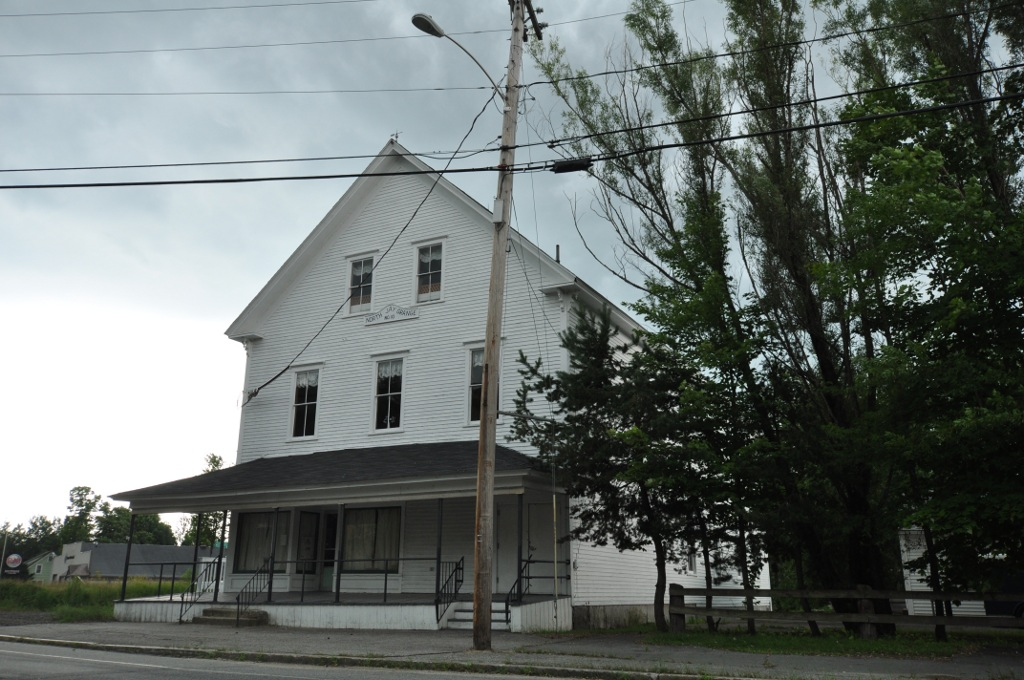

- Location within Maine Location within the United States
- Location: ME 17, North Jay, Maine
- Coordinates: 44°33′15″N 70°14′9″W
- Area: 0.5 acres (0.20 ha)
- Built: 1895
- NRHP reference No.: 74000150
- Added to NRHP: October 23, 1974

The North Jay Grange Store is an historic Grange Hall and store on East Dixfield Road (Maine State Route 17) in the village of North Jay in Jay, Maine. It was built in 1895 by North Jay Grange No. 10 to replace its hall on the same site which had burned down earlier that year. Part of the building was later set aside for a Grange store. Closed in 1976, the Grange Store claimed to be the last of its type in the nation. On October 23, 1974, it was listed on the National Register of Historic Places in 1974.

== Description and history ==
The North Jay Grange Store is set at the junction of Maine State Routes 17 and 4 with Jay Hill Road, which is the main junction of the village of North Jay. The store, which faces northeast, is a 2 1/2-story wood-frame building, with a front gable roof, clapboard siding, and a brick foundation. A single-story hip-roofed porch extends across the front. The porch is supported by metal posts with metal balustrade between. Two sets of stairs and an accessibility ramp on the left side give access to from ground level. Under the porch, the facade has a commercial store front with plate glass windows and recessed entry on the left, and a double doorway on the right, from which stairs lead to the hall above. Above the porch there are three sash windows on the second level, and two in the gable. The first floor of the building housed the store, and the second floor contains an open meeting space with stage. The third floor houses a kitchen.

The North Jay Grange was organized in 1874, and its first building was built in 1889. Destroyed by fire in 1895, it was replaced by the present building the same year. The first floor was remodeled to accommodate the store at a later date; the organization is known to have operated a store since 1882, originally at another location. The store closed in 1976; it had billed itself (by its sign on the front) as the "Last Grange Store".

== See also ==
- National Register of Historic Places listings in Franklin County, Maine
