= Weld Town Hall =

- U.S. National Register of Historic Places
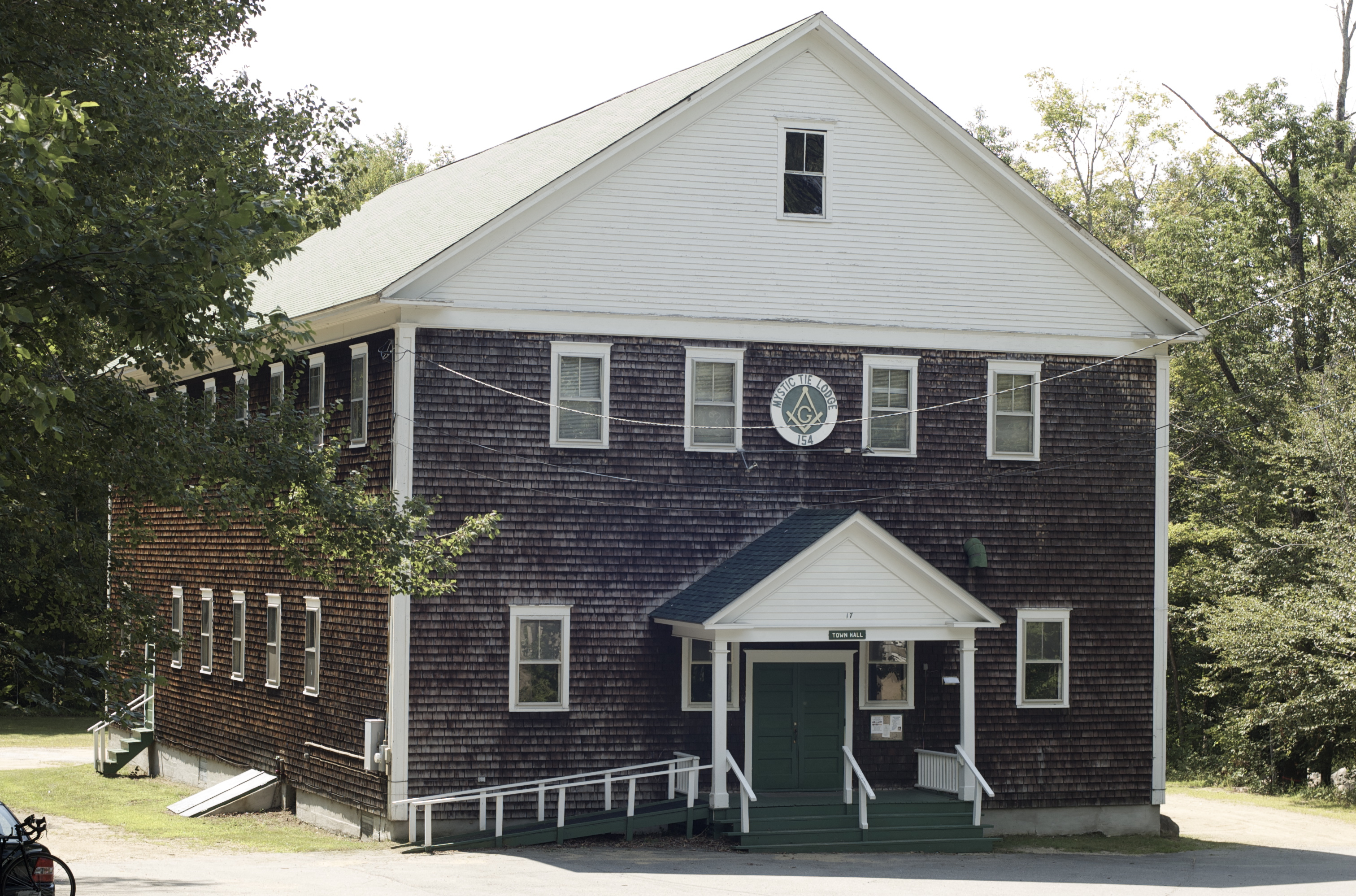

- Location within Maine Location within the United States
- Location: 17 School St., Weld, Maine
- Coordinates: 44°41′51″N 70°25′12″W
- Area: 1.4 acres (0.57 ha)
- Built: 1922
- Architect: Schofield, Fessenden
- Architectural style: Late 19th And 20th Century Revivals
- NRHP reference No.: 07000597
- Added to NRHP: June 27, 2007

Weld Town Hall is located at 17 School Street (also referred to as Wilton Road and Maine State Route 156) in Weld, Maine. Built 1922–26 by the local Masonic Lodge, the build has been a major community center for many years, and has hosted its town meetings since 1925. It is now owned by the town, with space leased to the Masons on the second floor. It was listed on the National Register of Historic Places. (Weld's municipal offices are located in a more modern facility on Mill Street.)

== Description and history ==
Weld Town Hall is located on the south side of School Street, just east of Houghton Brook and a short way east of the junction of School Street with Mill Street (Maine State Route 142). It is a large two-story rectangular wood-frame structure, with a front-gable roof, shingle and clapboard siding, and a cement foundation. The first floor of the main (north-facing) facade is five bays wide, with a center entrance and two sash windows on either side. The center three bays are sheltered by a gable-roofed portico, supported by square posts, with a handicap access ramp leading down to the left. The second floor facade has four windows spaced symmetrically but at irregular intervals, with a Masonic shield at the center. The gable end has a single sash window.

The interior begins with a small vestibule that opens into a large open room with a stage at the far end. To the left of the entrance stairs rise to the second floor, while there is a ticket booth and a small kitchen area (accessible only from the hall) to the right. The second floor is divided into a number of rooms leased to the Masonic lodge, and has a film projection room that contains projection equipment dating to the 1920s and 1930s. The projection area is accessed via a stepladder from the kitchen below. The hall is outfitted with a curtain which demarcates the stage area, and with retractable basketball hoops.

The town of Weld was first organized as Webb's Pond Plantation in 1812, and incorporated as Weld in 1816. Its first town hall was located in the lower village, but the upper village later became more economically significant, and it is where this building is located. Construction, which took place 1922–26, was funded by the Masonic Tie Lodge No. 154, and was from the completion of its first floor opened by the Masons as a community meeting space. The Masons lost the building to foreclosure in 1937, and the town voted to purchase it from the bank in 1940. It has been the location of town meetings since 1925, in addition to a large number of local social functions.

== See also ==
- National Register of Historic Places listings in Franklin County, Maine
