= Maine Woods Office =

- U.S. National Register of Historic Places
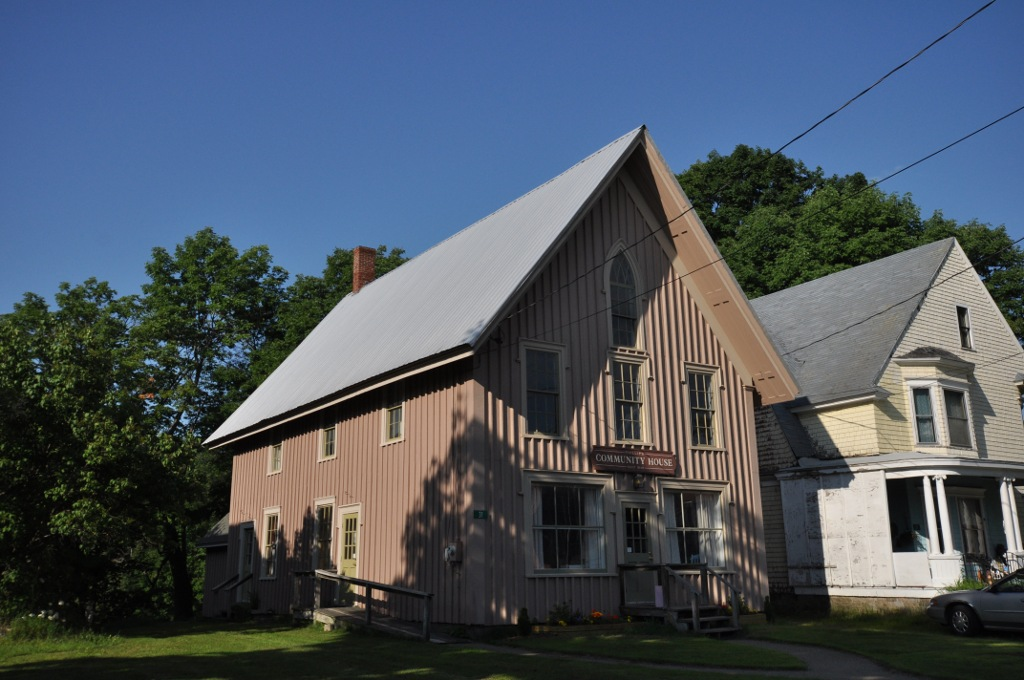

- Location within Maine Location within the United States
- Location: Main St., Phillips, Maine
- Coordinates: 44°49′27″N 70°20′55″W
- Area: 0.3 acres (0.12 ha)
- Built: 1848
- Built by: Moses Sherburne
- Architectural style: Gothic Revival
- NRHP reference No.: 80000216
- Added to NRHP: November 10, 1980

The Maine Woods Office, now the Phillips Community Building, is a historic commercial and community building on Main Street in Phillips, Maine. Built in 1848 by a local lawyer, it is regionally significant as a rare example of commercial Gothic Revival architecture, and as the original home of the Maine Woods newspaper, which disseminated news about sporting and hunting in Maine to an international audience. The building was listed on the National Register of Historic Places in 1980.

== Description and history ==
The building is a 2-1/2 story wood frame structure, with a granite foundation and a steeply-pitched front-gable roof. The building is sheathed in vertical board-and-batten siding, characteristic of the Gothic Revival. The front facade is three bays wide, with a pair of large single-sash windows flanking a center entry. The second level has three double-hung sash windows, and there is a Gothic-arched window in the gable end. The building is one a few known Gothic Revival commercial structures in the state.

The building has seen a variety of uses since it was built in 1848 by Moses Sherburne, a prominent local lawyer and businessman. Its upper level was used by the local Masonic lodge between 1851 and 1902. In 1878 the lower level housed the offices of the Maine Woods newspaper, which carried news about hunting and fishing in Maine to an international audience. The building was purchased in 1918 by the local Congregation Church, which has operated it since then as a community meeting space.

== See also ==
- National Register of Historic Places listings in Franklin County, Maine
