= Coplin Plantation Schoolhouse =

- U.S. National Register of Historic Places
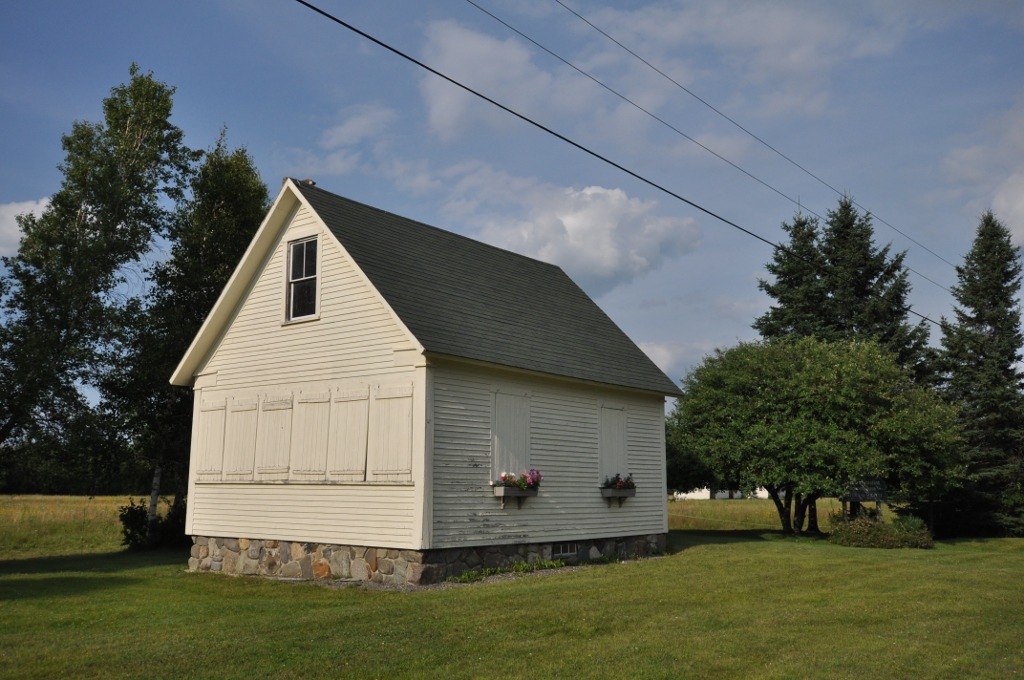

- Location within Maine Location within the United States
- Nearest city: Stratton, Maine
- Coordinates: 45°5′32″N 70°29′55″W
- Area: less than one acre
- Built: 1866
- NRHP reference No.: 97001132
- Added to NRHP: September 11, 1997

The Coplin Plantation Schoolhouse is a historic school building in Coplin Plantation, Maine, a rural community in Franklin County. It is the only school building known to have been built by the community, and probably predates its formal establishment in 1866. It served as a school until 1943, and is now owned and cared for by the local historical society. It was listed on the National Register of Historic Places in 1997.

== Description and history ==
The schoolhouse is a single-story wood-frame structure, resting on a granite foundation, with a steeply pitched gable roof. A gabled vestibule area extends to the east, and there is a shed-roof outhouse addition to the rear. The building is located on the north side of Maine State Route 16, about 4.5 miles (7.2 km) southwest of its junction with Route 27 in Stratton.

The interior is finished with wainscoting and pressed metal walls and ceilings, with a cornice featuring egg-and-dart patterning. The only known substantial changes since the 19th century are the alteration to the fenestration sometime before its closure in 1943. The foundation was rebuilt in 1996.

The construction date of the building is unknown, in part because the early history of Coplin Plantation is poorly documented. Bloomfield Plantation, encompassing this area, was organized in 1841, and Coplin Plantation was established in 1866, at which time this building appears to have been standing. A local history asserts without evidence that it was built in the 1820s, but architectural evidence suggests a mid-19th century construction date. It is also possible that extensive renovations funded by the community in 1869 resulted in the construction of a new building; the community has only ever reported the existence of a single school building in its annual reports. The building was used as a school until 1943. The Coplin Plantation Historical Society was formed in 1985, expressly to see to the preservation and care of the building.

== See also ==
- National Register of Historic Places listings in Franklin County, Maine
