= Old Union Meetinghouse =

Historic church in Maine, United States

- U.S. National Register of Historic Places
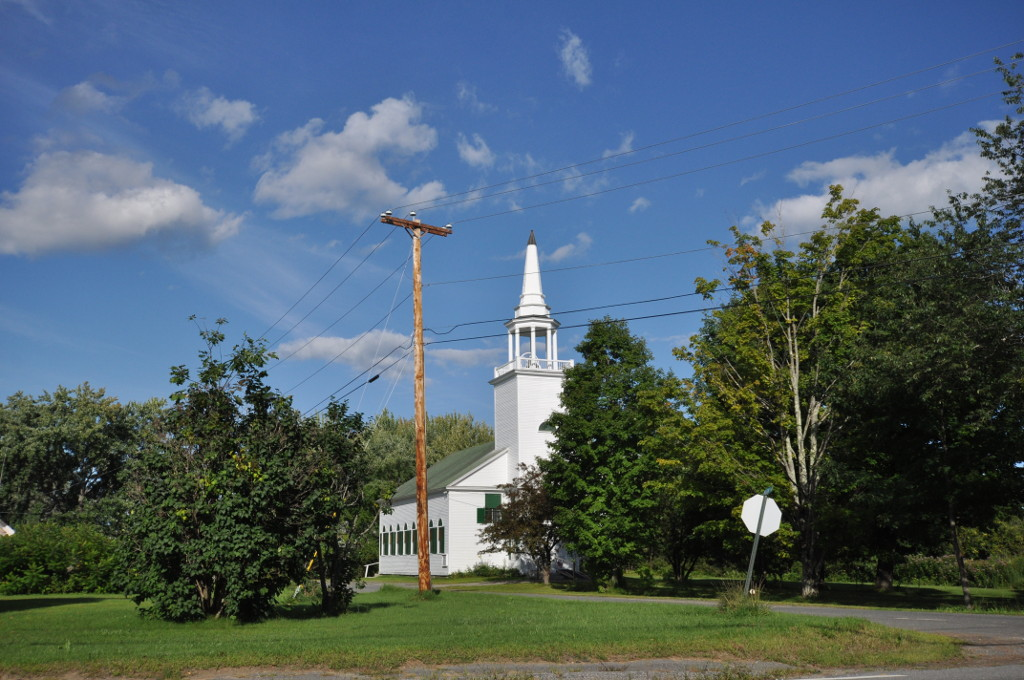

- Location within Maine
- Location: U.S. 2, Farmington, Maine
- Coordinates: 44°37′25.3″N 70°4′39.7″W
- Area: 1 acre (0.40 ha)
- Built: 1826/7
- Architect: Benjamin Butler
- Architectural style: Federal
- NRHP reference No.: 73000106
- Added to NRHP: October 30, 1973

The Old Union Meetinghouse, now the Union Baptist Church, is a historic church at 107 Mason Road in the Farmington Falls area of Farmington, Maine. Built in 1826–27, it is a high-quality and well-preserved example of a traditional late-colonial meetinghouse with Federal-style details. The building was listed on the National Register of Historic Places in 1973.

== Description and history ==
In March 1833, a committee of the committee of the Frankfort Union Meeting House Corporation contracted Calvin Ryder, a twenty-three year old local builder, to construct the church according to plans prepared by Bangor architect Charles H. Pond for the Orrington Methodist Church.

The building is set facing southwest. It is on the southeast side of a short stretch of Mason Road, which runs NE-SW between United States Route 2 and Maine State Route 41. It is a basically rectangular wood frame structure with a front-gable roof, clapboard siding, and a granite foundation. A vestibule, projecting from the front façade, provides a partial base for the square church tower, whose main stage rises partially through the main roof to an open octagonal belfry area supported by round columns. A series of octagonal sections, decreasing in size, are capped by the steeple and weather vane. The projecting vestibule has two doorways, each framed by delicate pilasters, and topped by a fanlight, with a set of windows at the gallery level, topped by a small pedimented gable. The main sides of the façade are unadorned except for windows at the gallery level. The sides of the building have eight sash windows, each with shutters and a fanlight above.

Design and construction of the church, which was completed in 1827, are attributed to Benjamin Butler, a builder who moved to Farmington from Massachusetts in 1790. Butler is also credited with building the first bridge across the Sandy River, and he was a member of the town's building committee. Unlike many churches built in the 1820s, its form is more reminiscent of church designs of the mid-18th century. although its exterior styling is in the then-popular Federal style. The only substantive work on the church took place in 1854, when its pews were rebuilt, and its walls repainted and papered. Although the church was originally built to serve multiple denominations, it is now owned and maintained by a Baptist congregation.

== See also ==
- National Register of Historic Places listings in Franklin County, Maine
