= Porter-Bell-Brackley Estate =

Historic house in Maine, United States

- U.S. National Register of Historic Places
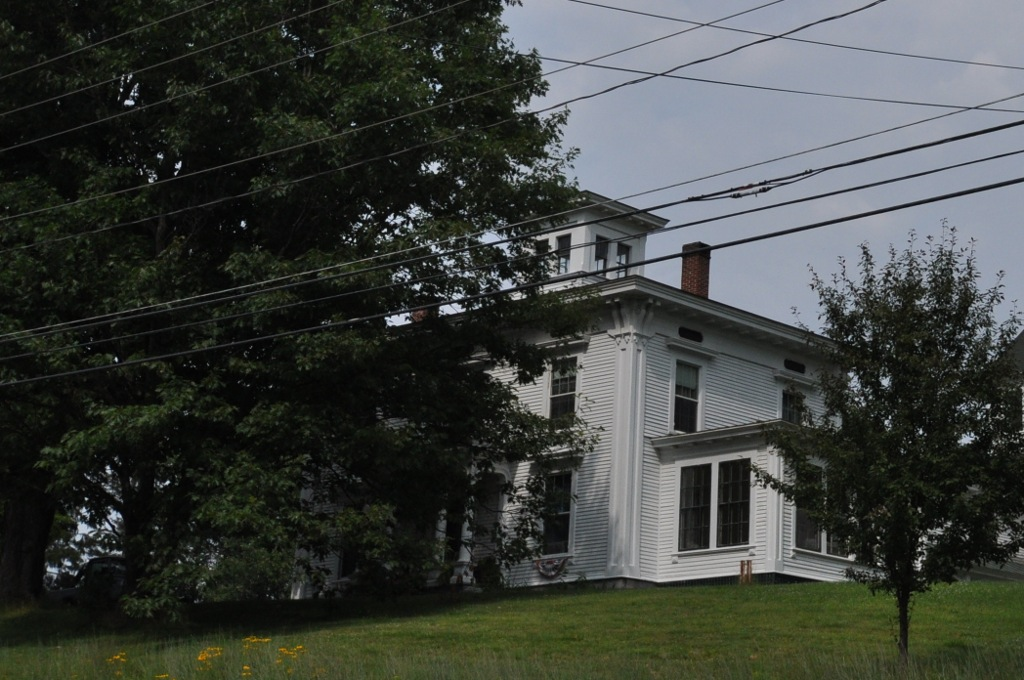

- Location within Maine Location within the United States
- Location: Lower Main St., Strong, Maine
- Coordinates: 44°48′16″N 70°13′14″W
- Area: 0.5 acres (0.20 ha)
- Built: 1866
- Architectural style: Italianate
- NRHP reference No.: 80000218
- Added to NRHP: November 10, 1980

The Porter-Bell-Brackley Estate is a historic house on Lower Main Street in Strong, Maine, a small town in rural Franklin County. Built in 1866, it is a remarkably sophisticated example of Italianate architecture, and one of the finest examples of such in the state. The house was listed on the National Register of Historic Places in 1980.

== Description ==
The house is a clapboarded wood-frame structure, two stories high, resting on a granite foundation. It has a hip roof which is topped by a square cupola. A two-story ell extends to the rear of the house, joining it to a carriage house. The main facade is three bays wide, with a central entry sheltered by an ornately decorated Doric-columned portico. The eaves are studded with dentil molding and brackets, and the corners of the building are pilastered. The ell is lined on both sides with porches. The carriage house is roughly square, with a pyramidal roof and a small cupola that is less elaborate than that on the house.

The house was built by Alexander Porter, who, along with his brother James, owned a toothpick factory that was a predecessor to the locally significant Foster Manufacturing Company. This house and another built by James were virtual duplicates; the latter was destroyed by fire in 1971. Porter eventually lost his business and property (supposedly due to "temptations of the flesh"), and the family was forced to sell the property.

== See also ==
- National Register of Historic Places listings in Franklin County, Maine
