= Hiram Ramsdell House =

Historic house in Maine, United States

- U.S. National Register of Historic Places
- U.S. Historic district – Contributing property
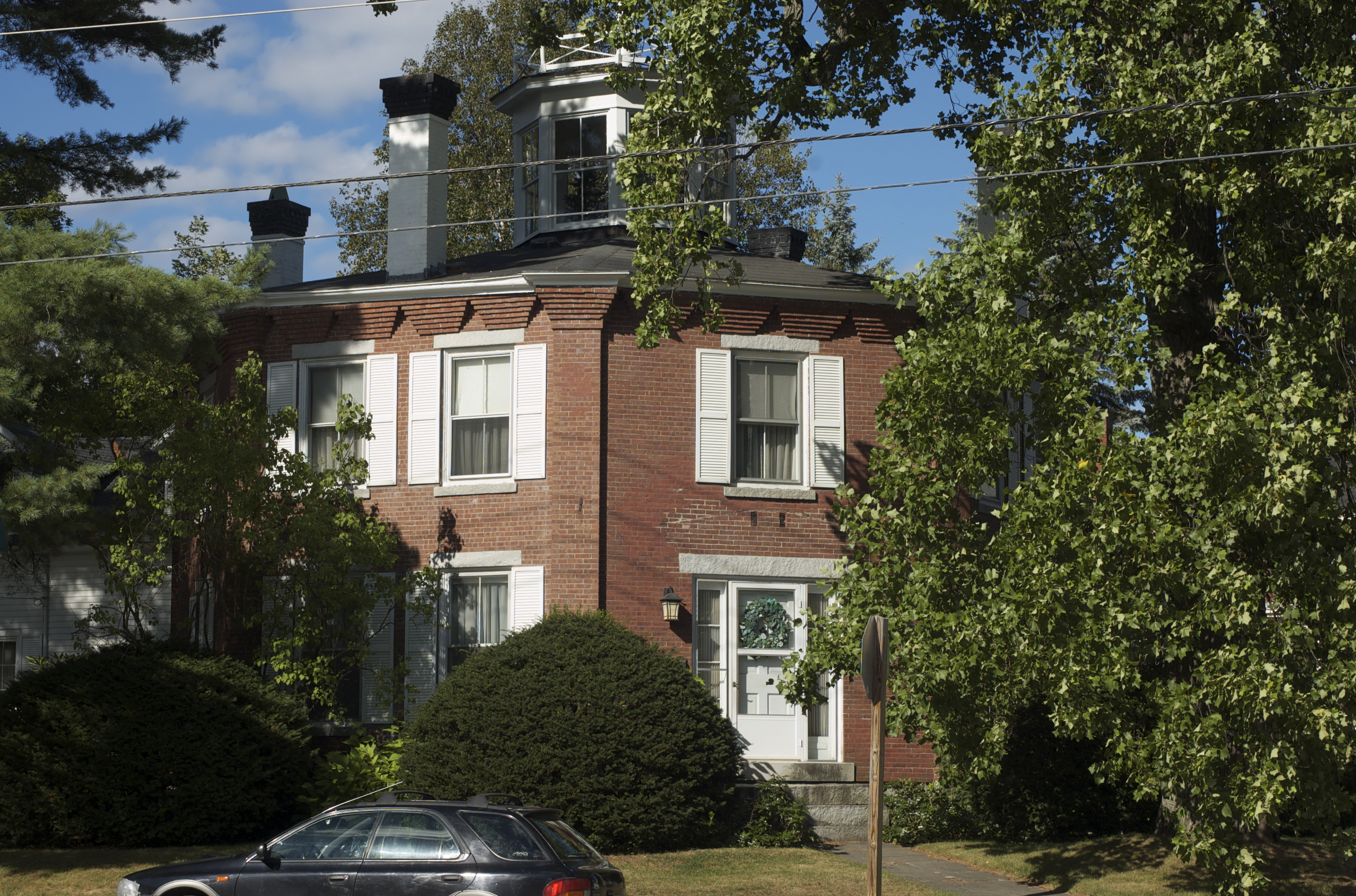

- Location within Maine Location within the United States
- Location: High and Perham Sts., Farmington, Maine
- Coordinates: 44°40′17″N 70°8′58″W
- Built: 1858
- Architect: Ramsdell, Cyrus
- Architectural style: Octagon Mode
- Part of: Farmington Historic District (ID94001551)
- NRHP reference No.: 73000107

Significant dates
- Added to NRHP: December 4, 1973
- Designated CP: January 20, 1995

The Hiram Ramsdell House, also called the Octagon House, is an historic octagonal house located at High and Perham streets in Farmington, Maine. Built in 1858 by mason Cyrus Ramsdell, it was added to the United States National Register of Historic Places on December 4, 1973.

== Description and history ==
The Octagon House was inspired by the octagon house designs of Orson Squire Fowler. Fowler thought that a round shape was conducive to better air circulation and socialization. The Hiram Ramsdell House has an eight-sided glass cupola over the central staircase. The first floor has five rooms around the core while there are seven bedrooms on the second floor.

Cyrus Ramsdell occupied the house for ten years before he sold the property to his brother Hiram Ramsdell, who resided there until his death in 1903. The house was used for apartments in the 20th century and subsequently fell into disrepair. In 1912, Farmington Normal School (today the University of Maine at Farmington) principal Wilbert G. Mallett bought the house.

On February 26, 2012, the owner of the house, Deborah Mallett Cressall, died, and her family offered the Farmington Historical Society the chance to buy the house at a steeply reduced price. The Farmington Historical Society received a May 30, 2013, deadline to buy the house and quickly began a campaign to raise $250,000 to buy the home. That money would also fund the renovations to the roof and drainage systems. The Farmington Historical Society acquired the house in May 2013.

== See also ==
- National Register of Historic Places listings in Franklin County, Maine
