= McCleary Farm =

Historic house in Maine, United States

- U.S. National Register of Historic Places
- U.S. Historic district
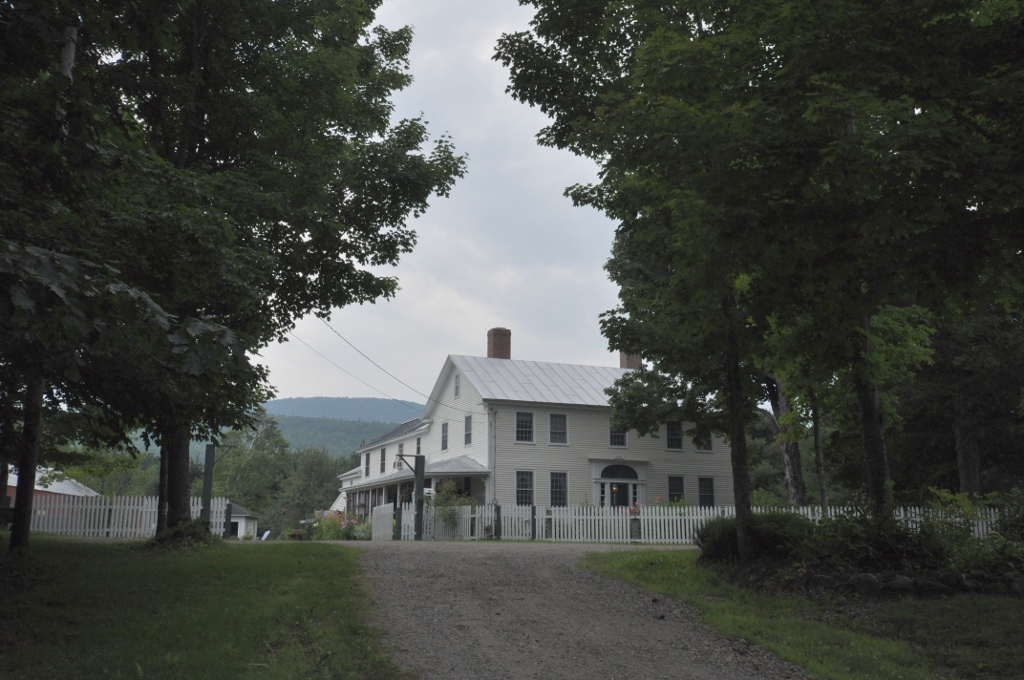

- Location within Maine Location within the United States
- Location: South Strong Road, Strong, Maine
- Area: 17 acres (6.9 ha)
- Built: 1828
- Mural artist: Jonathan D. Poor
- Architectural style: Federal
- NRHP reference No.: 89000253
- Added to NRHP: April 7, 1989

The McCleary Farm is a historic farm complex on South Strong Road (Maine State Route 149) in Strong, Maine. Probably built sometime between 1825 and 1828, the main house is a fine local example of Federal style architecture. It is most notable, however, for the murals drawn on its walls by Jonathan Poor, an itinerant artist active in Maine in the 1830s. The property was listed on the National Register of Historic Places in 1989.

== Description and history ==
The McCleary Farm complex is set on the west side of South Strong Road, just north of its crossing of McCleary Brook, on a parcel of 17 acres (6.9 ha). It consists of a typical New England connected farmstead, with a main house block connected to a piggery and chicken house via an ell off the southwest corner. The complex also includes a 19th-century barn and blacksmith shop, and a 20th-century garage. Both the barn and blacksmith shop appear to be contemporaneous to the house.

The main block of the house is a rectangular wood-frame structure 2 1/2 stories tall and five bays wide, with a side gable roof, twin interior chimneys, and a granite foundation. A single-story hip-roof porch extends across the southern gable end, whose wall is flush with that of the rear ell. The main entrance is in the east-facing facade; it is framed by sidelight windows and a semi-elliptical transom window with a cornice above. The interior follows a typical central hall plan, with parlor and living room on either side of the hall in front, and the kitchen (which extends into the ell) and a bedroom in the rear. The living room features typical Federal style woodwork, and the parlor has flush wainscoting, with its plaster walls covered with painted murals.

Jonathan Poor (1807–45) was the nephew of Rufus Porter (1792-1884), whose varied career included a period (1815–24) in which he worked has an itinerant painter. Poor learned the trade and techniques from his uncle, whose guidelines for creating murals were published in the 1825 book Curious Arts. Poor's adherence to Porter's guidelines in creating murals means that attribution of work to him specifically is difficult. The murals in this house, which depict a generalized New England rolling hill scene, with mountains, Federal period houses, and a water scene, all elements recommended by Porter. They are painted in bold colors, with some detailed elements stenciled.

The farm was established by Robert McCleary, who cleared the land, and the house was built for his son William, probably between 1825 and 1828. The property is notable as one of the oldest surviving post-and-beam houses in Strong, and for the number of surviving early outbuildings, including the barn and the blacksmith shop, which includes remnants of the original forge.

== See also ==
- National Register of Historic Places listings in Franklin County, Maine
