= Rangeley Public Library =

- U.S. National Register of Historic Places
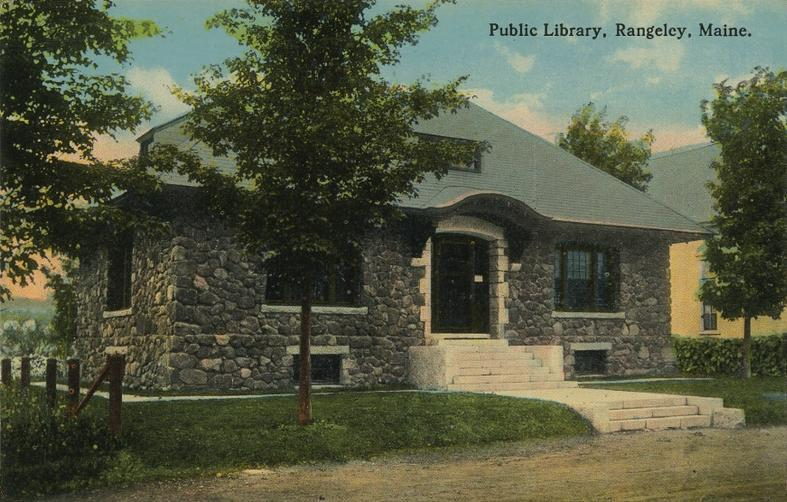
- Rangeley Public Library from a 1912 postcard

- Location within Maine Location within the United States
- Location: Lake Street, Rangeley, Maine
- Coordinates: 44.964722°N 70.643889°W
- Built: 1909
- Architect: Ambrose Walker
- Architectural style: Romanesque Revival
- NRHP reference No.: 78000161
- Added to NRHP: 1978

The Rangeley Public Library is located at 7 Lake Street in Rangeley, Maine. The library is privately owned by the non-profit Rangeley Library Association, and is open to the general public. It is located in an architecturally distinguished Romanesque Revival building designed by New York City architect Ambrose Walker and built in 1909, with a major addition in 2002. The building was listed on the National Register of Historic Places in 1978.

== Architecture and history ==
The library is set on the west side of Lake Street in the main village of Rangeley, a short distance south of Main Street (Maine State Route 4). Its original main block is a rectangular structure, 1 1/2 stories in height with a full basement. It has a hip roof of metal and slate, walls of local fieldstone trimmed with granite, and a granite foundation. The front (east-facing) facade is three bays wide, with the entrance recessed in the center bay under an arch that extends into the roof line, adding an eyebrow. The flanking bays each have a large 12-over-12 window with flanking narrow 6-over-6 windows, set in large arched openings with granite sills. The sides of the building have similar windows. The interior of the original portion has retained a significant amount of original woodwork and decoration. A major addition, added in 2002, extends from the rear of the building.

Rangeley's first library consisted of a donated set of books housed in a local retail establishment. The Rangeley Library Association was founded in 1907 to establish a permanent home and collection. The Romanesque Revival building was designed by New York City architect Ambrose Walker and dedicated in 1909; it is built entirely out of Maine materials, the fieldstone being locally sourced and the granite coming from North Jay. The library possessed a collection of 12,000 volumes in 1978, and now has more than 23,000.

== See also ==
- National Register of Historic Places listings in Franklin County, Maine
