= Little Red Schoolhouse (Farmington, Maine) =

- U.S. National Register of Historic Places
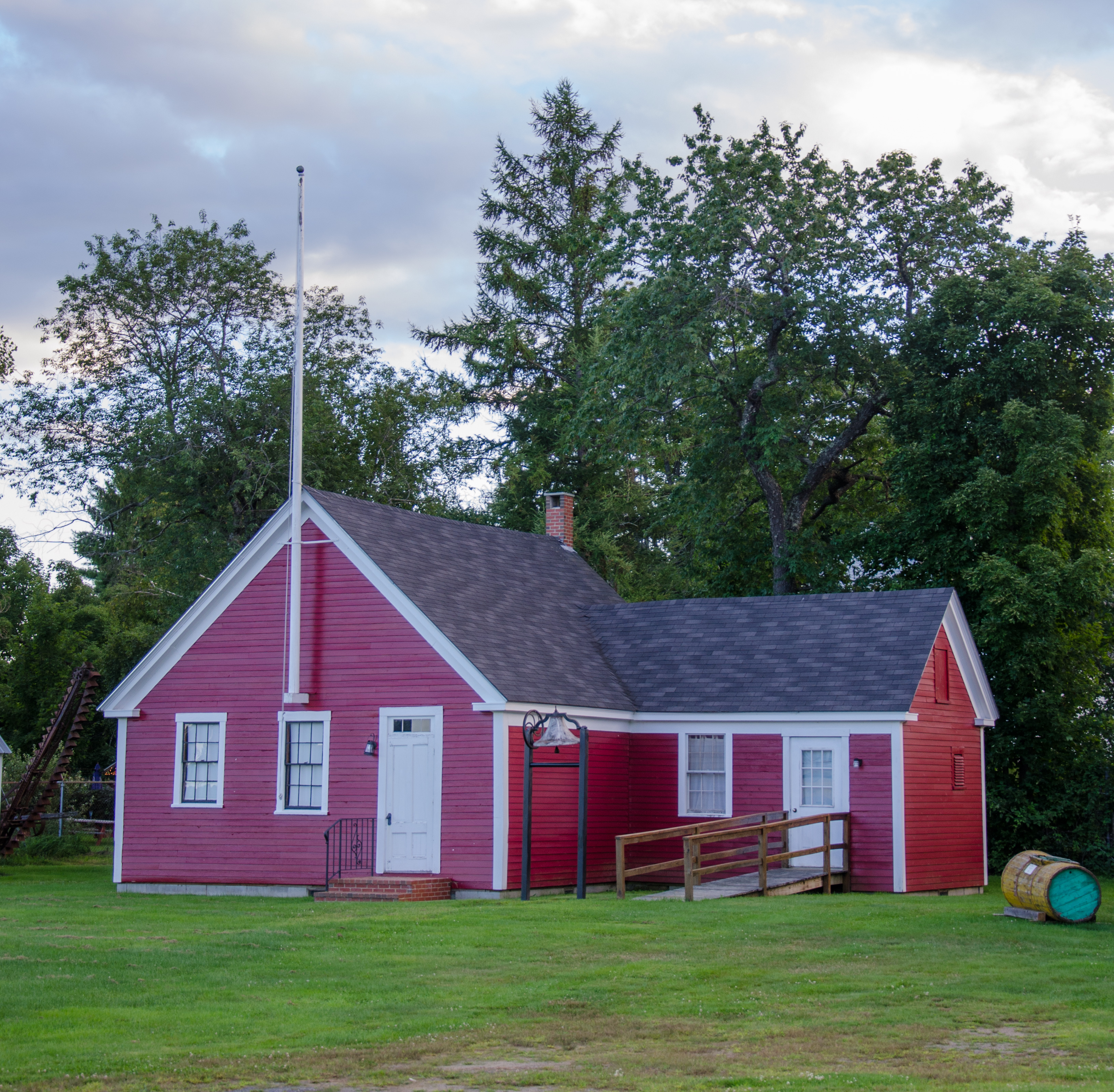

- Location within Maine Location within the United States
- Location: Franklin Agricultural Society fairgrounds, High Street, Farmington, Maine
- Coordinates: 44°39′46″N 70°8′23″W
- Built: 1852
- NRHP reference No.: 72000070
- Added to NRHP: February 23, 1972

The Little Red Schoolhouse, also known as Briggs Schoolhouse, is a historic schoolhouse in Farmington, Maine. The one-room wood-frame schoolhouse was built in 1852, and originally stood on the Wilton Road (Maine State Route 4) at Red Schoolhouse Road. It served Farmington as the Briggs District school until 1958, and is one of the community's few surviving district school buildings. It was then used as a space for students in special education before being finally closed in 1969. It was moved the Franklin Agricultural Society fairgrounds on High Street in 2007. The building was listed on the National Register of Historic Places in 1972. It is open to the public during the annual Farmington Fair.

== Description and history ==
The schoolhouse is an L-shaped single story wood-frame structure, built in 1852. The original structure measured 24 by 48 feet (7.3 m × 14.6 m), with a 14-by-14-foot (4.3 m × 4.3 m) addition added at an unknown date. The building is distinguished from other district schoolhouses of the period by an interior arched ceiling, which was originally plastered, but is now covered with wood sheathing. Original pine sheathing is used on the interior walls to a height of 3 feet (0.91 m). An outline of where the teacher's raised platform was located is visible in this sheathing on the south wall, as are the locations of benches on other walls. Many of the alterations to the interior date to an extensive renovation in 1898.

The schoolhouse was originally located near the junction of Wilton Road and Red Schoolhouse Road. It was used as a district school until 1920, when it was adapted for use as a model school (one of only five in the state) for teacher training, a role which it filled for twelve years. From 1962 to 1969 it was used as a training center for the mentally handicapped, and served for a time as a seasonal visitors center. It was moved the Franklin Agricultural Society fairgrounds on High Street in 2007.

== See also ==
- National Register of Historic Places listings in Franklin County, Maine
