= Former Town House (Salem, Maine) =

- Salem Town House (Former)
- U.S. National Register of Historic Places
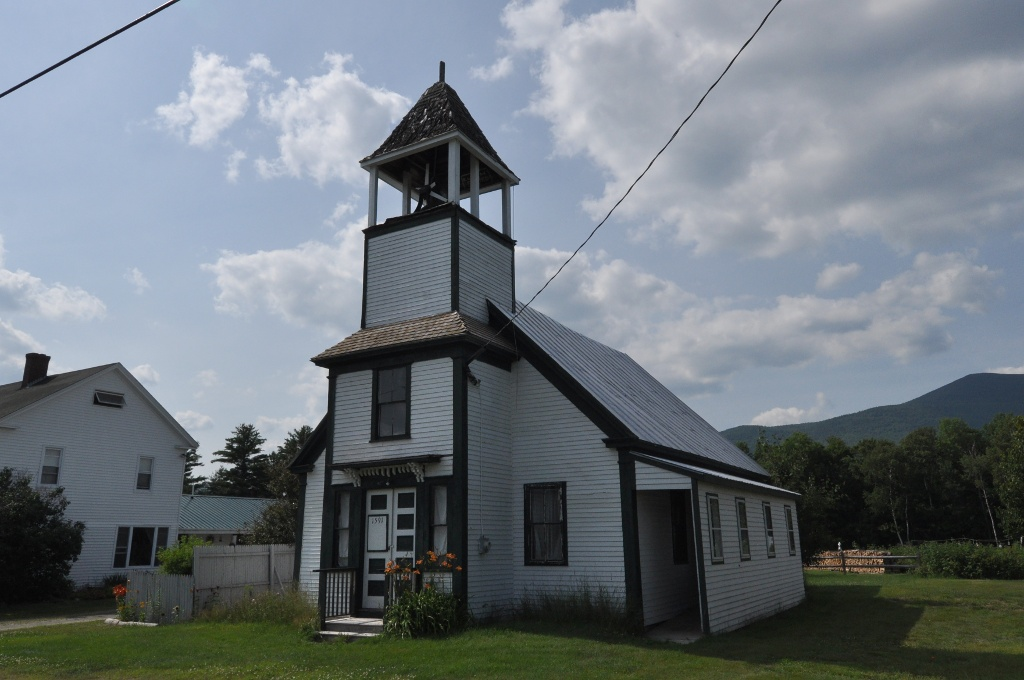

- Location within Maine Location within the United States
- Location: ME 142, Salem, Maine
- Coordinates: 44°54′5″N 70°16′35″W
- Area: 0.1 acres (0.040 ha)
- Built: 1858
- Built by: Cyrus J. Ellsworth
- Architectural style: Italianate
- NRHP reference No.: 05000795
- Added to NRHP: August 5, 2005

The Former Town House of Salem, Maine, now the Salem Community Building, is located on Maine State Route 142, a short way west of Mt. Abram Regional High School. Completed in 1858, it is the only civic building built during the existence of the municipality, which was established in 1823 and disincorporated in 1945. The church-like building is architecturally notable for its Italianate styling, and for its social history as the site of community social and government activity. The building was listed on the National Register of Historic Places in 2005.

== Description and history ==
The former Salem town house stands on the north side of Maine State Route 142, roughly midway between Phillips and Kingfield, just west of the Mt. Abram Regional High School complex, in the most densely-built area of the former town of Salem. It is a basically rectangulare wood-frame structure, with a square section projecting at the front that provides the entrance vestibule and a tower. The entry is a single door topped by a shallow hood, with flanking narrow sash windows. The walls on either side of the projecting section have larger sash windows. Above the entry the projecting section has a sash window, with a section of roof skirting separating the next stage of the tower, which is topped by an open belfry and a pyramidal roof. The building is otherwise clad in clapboard siding. The right side of the building has a narrow addition with a shed roof whose line begins just below that of the main roof, and there is a single-story addition to the rear. The interior of the building consists of a large open space, with the addition housing a kitchen and restrooms.

The area that is now the former town of Salem was first settled in 1814, and successfully petitioned for separation from neighboring Phillips and Freeman in 1823 as "North Salem". The town was renamed "Salem" in 1834. The town's population peaked at 561 in 1840. Civic meetings were held in convenient local buildings, including barns, stores, and a starch factory building, before this town house was built in 1857–58. The building was also used for religious services by a variety of local denominations, a fairly common practice of the period. The tower is probably a later addition, because it more closely resembles typical church construction of the 1890s-1910s. At the 1940 census the town's population had declined to 78, and it relinquished its municipal charter to the state in 1945. The town house and adjacent cemetery were sold for $1 to the non-profit Mount Abran Cemetery Association, which has maintained the building as a community hall since.

== See also ==
- National Register of Historic Places listings in Franklin County, Maine
