= First Congregational Church, United Church of Christ =

Historic church in Maine, United States

- U.S. National Register of Historic Places
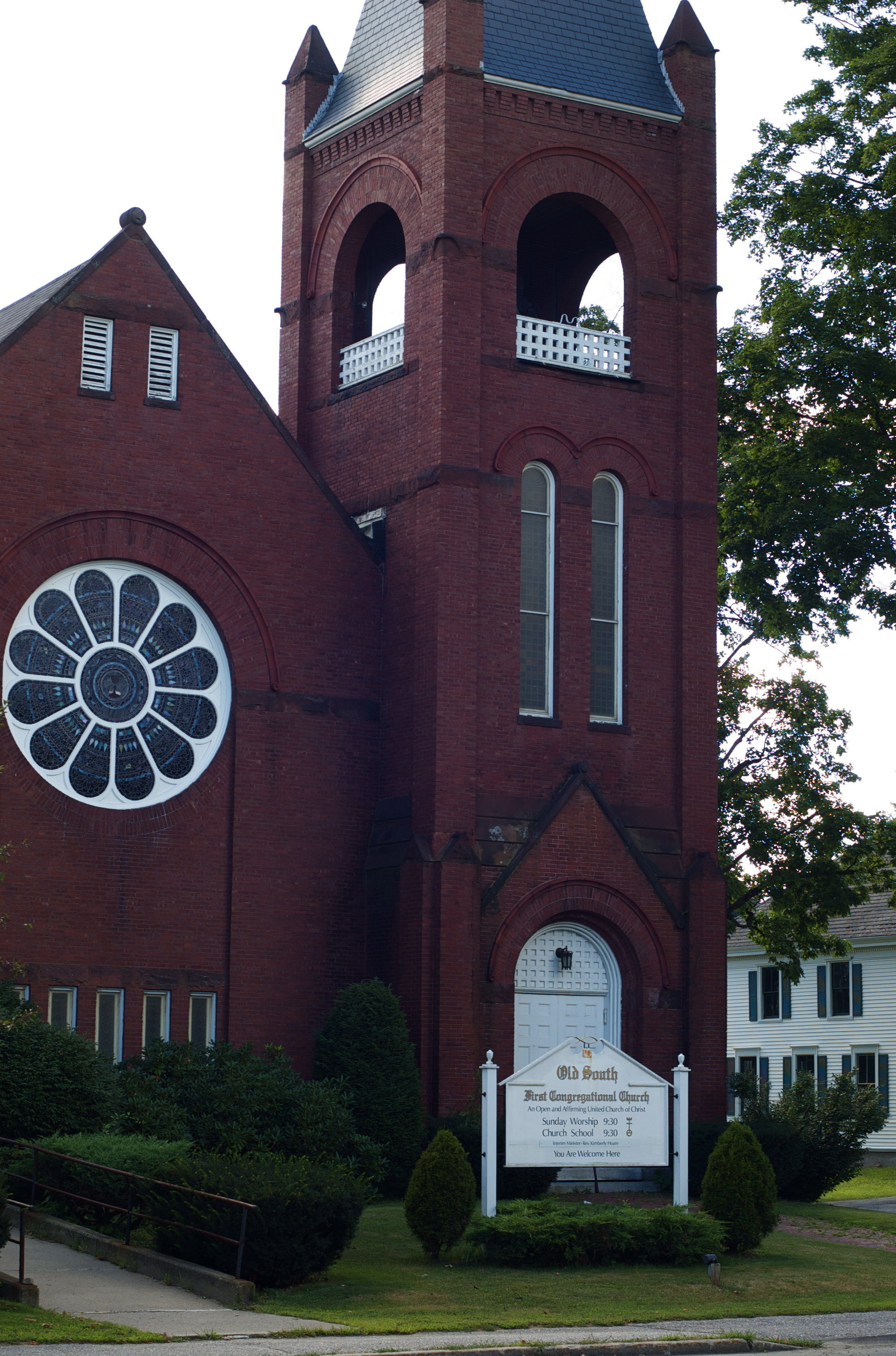

- Location within Maine Location within the United States
- Location: Main St., Farmington, Maine
- Coordinates: 44°40′4″N 70°9′0″W
- Area: 1 acre (0.40 ha)
- Built: 1887
- Architect: Coombs, George M.
- Architectural style: Romanesque
- NRHP reference No.: 74000149
- Added to NRHP: July 25, 1974

The First Congregational Church, United Church of Christ, also known as the New Old South Congregational Church, is a historic church at 235 Main Street in Farmington, Maine. The congregation's present sanctuary is a brick Romanesque structure designed by George M. Coombs and was completed in 1887. It is the town's finest 19th-century church, and one of the most architecturally sophisticated in the region. It was listed on the National Register of Historic Places in 1974. The congregation, established in 1814, celebrated its 200th anniversary in 2014.

== Architecture and history ==
The congregation of the South Congregational Church was formally established in 1814, having existed in an informal way for about 10 years, sharing space with other religious groups in a common meeting house. In 1814 the congregation built its own church, which was burned down in a major fire which swept through Farmington in 1886. The congregation then retained the Lewiston-based architect George M. Coombs to design a replacement structure. (Coombs would also design a number of other prominent buildings in Farmington that were built after the fire.)

The building Coombs designed is a large brick Romanesque Revival structure, with a granite foundation and brownstone trim. The main facade, facing Main Street, has the roof gable flanked by a pair of towers that project slightly from the corners. The right-hand tower is the larger of the two, rising in four stages to a pyramidal roof with square pinnacles at the corners. The left-hand tower is three stages, and lacks the pinnacles. A doorway is found in the base of each tower, recessed in a round-arch opening. The center of the main facade is dominated by a large wheel window, fashioned in stained glass by Redding and Baird of Boston, which is set under a slightly-recessed arch and above a row of five rectangular windows.

== See also ==
- National Register of Historic Places listings in Franklin County, Maine
