= New Sharon Congregational Church =

Historic church in Maine, United States

- U.S. National Register of Historic Places
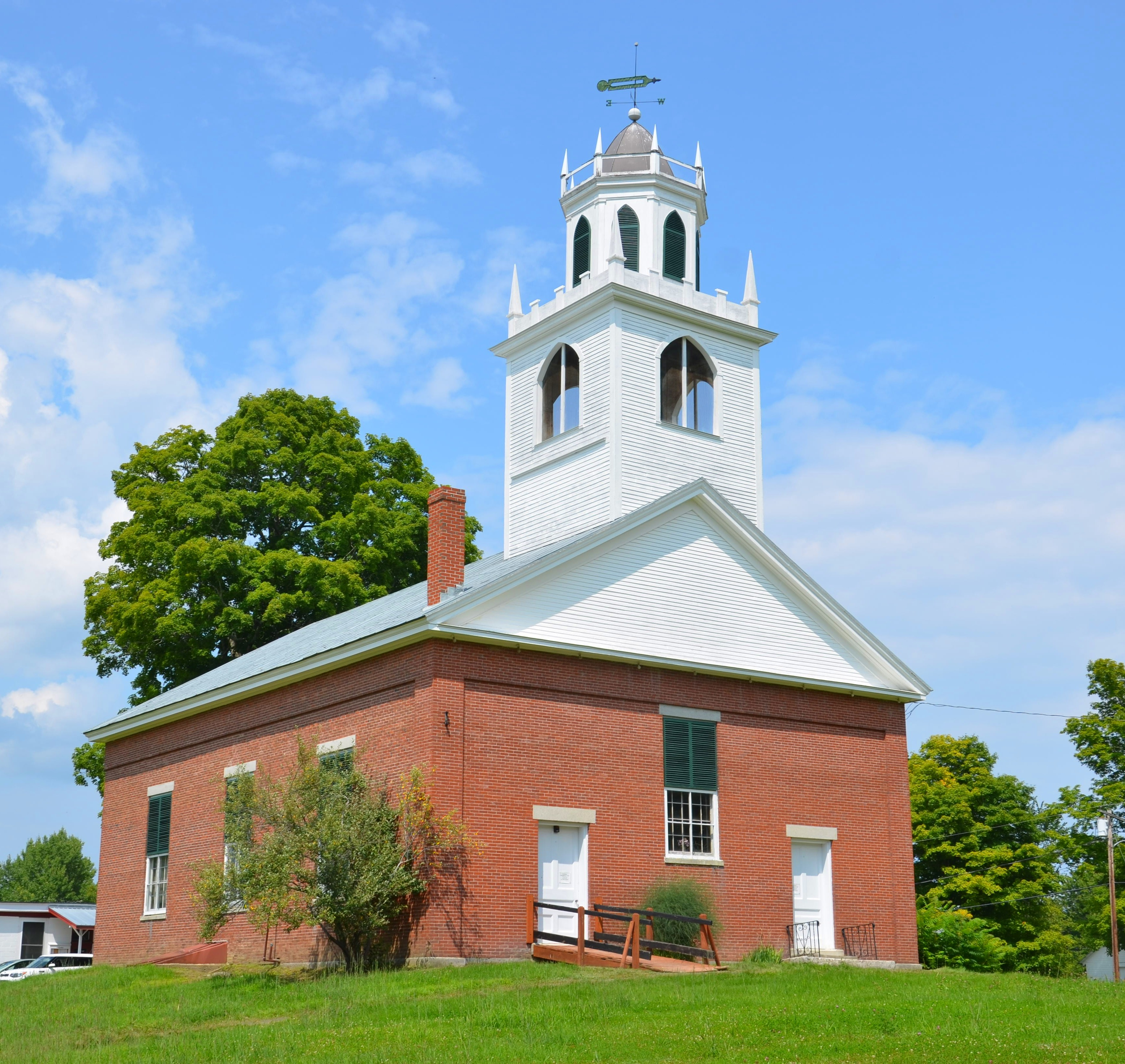

- Location within Maine Location within the United States
- Location: 21 Cape Cod Hill Road, New Sharon, Maine
- Coordinates: 44°38′10″N 70°0′50″W
- Area: 1 acre (0.40 ha)
- Built: 1845
- Architectural style: Mid 19th Century Revival
- NRHP reference No.: 85001261
- Added to NRHP: June 20, 1985

The New Sharon Congregational Church is a historic church at 21 Cape Cod Hill Road in New Sharon, Maine, United States. Built in 1845, this brick structure is an example of Greek Revival architecture, and stands as a focal point of the rural town's center. The building was listed on the National Register of Historic Places in 1985. The church is affiliated with the United Church of Christ.

== Description and history ==
The New Sharon Congregational Church is a rectangular brick structure, facing southeast on a rise overlooking the residential center of the town of New Sharon. It has a front-facing gable roof, with a clapboarded pediment. Its tower, rising from the ridge behind the main facade, begins with a square stage that has wide lancet-arch windows divided by a thin vertical strip, finished in clapboards and topped by a low balustrade and corner turrets. The second stage is an octagonal belfry with lancet-arched louvers, topped by a thin railing with turreted posts. A slightly bell-cast octagonal dome and weathervane top the tower. The main facade has two symmetrically-placed entrances and a tall raised window at the center. The only ornamentation in the brickwork are projecting pillars and entablature at the corners and roofline.

The church was built in 1845 to replace an earlier wood-frame building destroyed by fire. This older building had been built in 1816 as a common meeting house for four different denominations; the Baptists, Methodists, and Unitarians had all eventually built their own buildings, leaving the original with the Congregationalists. The rise the building stands on includes a large grassy area, which is the nearest thing New Sharon has to a town common.

== See also ==
- National Register of Historic Places listings in Franklin County, Maine
