= William F. Norton House =

Historic house in Maine, United States

- U.S. National Register of Historic Places
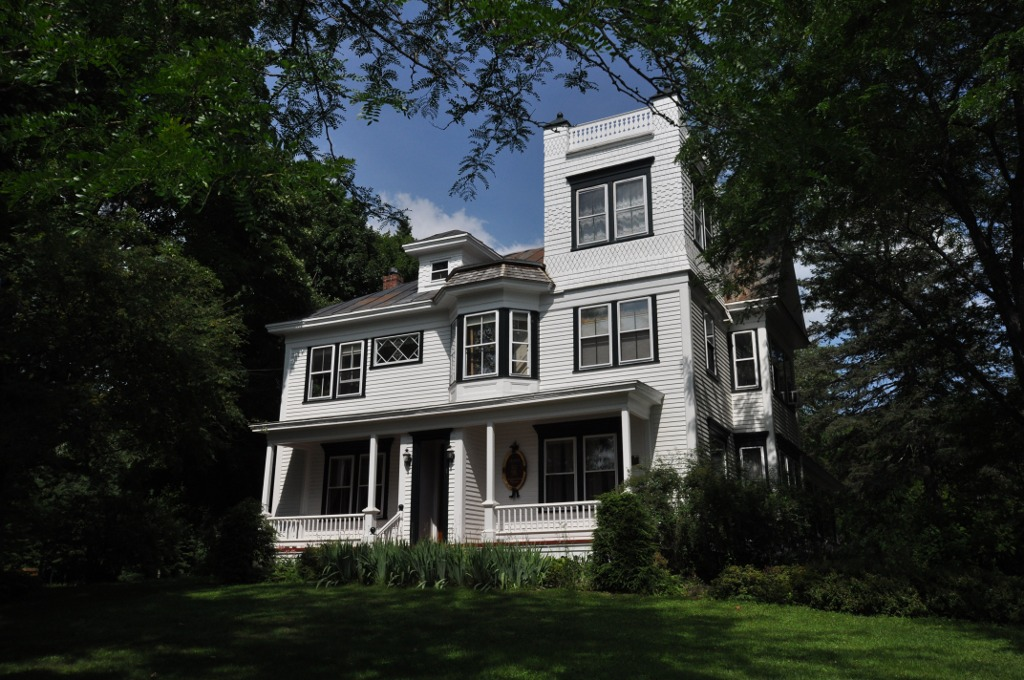

- Location within Maine Location within the United States
- Location: 1 Stanley Ave., Kingfield, Maine
- Coordinates: 44°57′39″N 70°9′6″W
- Area: 0.3 acres (0.12 ha)
- Built: 1900
- Built by: Norton, Lavella & William
- Architectural style: Queen Anne
- NRHP reference No.: 82000741
- Added to NRHP: July 8, 1982

The William F. Norton House is a historic house at 1 Stanley Avenue in Kingfield, Maine. Built in 1900 by brothers William and Lavella Norton, it is a particularly elaborate example of Queen Anne architecture in a rural setting with a square tower believed to be unique in the state. The house was listed on the National Register of Historic Places in 1982. It now houses a restaurant and bed and breakfast inn.

== Description and history ==
The Norton House is set on the east side of Stanley Avenue, a residential side street just outside the village center of Kingfield. It is a 2 1/2-story wood-frame structure, with a complex cross-gable configuration that includes a prominent three-story square tower with an elaborate woodwork parapet at the top. The building is finished in a combination of shingling (including decorative cut shingles at the higher levels) and clapboards, and rests on a granite foundation.

The house was built in 1900-01 by Lavella Norton, a master builder whose other local works include the Amos G. Winter House and Webster Hall. The interior woodwork was executed by Norton's brother William, and includes a molded oak arch, a multi-wood parquet floor in the dining room, and kitchen cabinetry and molding of birdseye maple.

The house is now a bed and breakfast inn and restaurant.

== See also ==
- National Register of Historic Places listings in Franklin County, Maine
