= Oquossoc Log Church =

Historic church in Maine, United States

- U.S. National Register of Historic Places
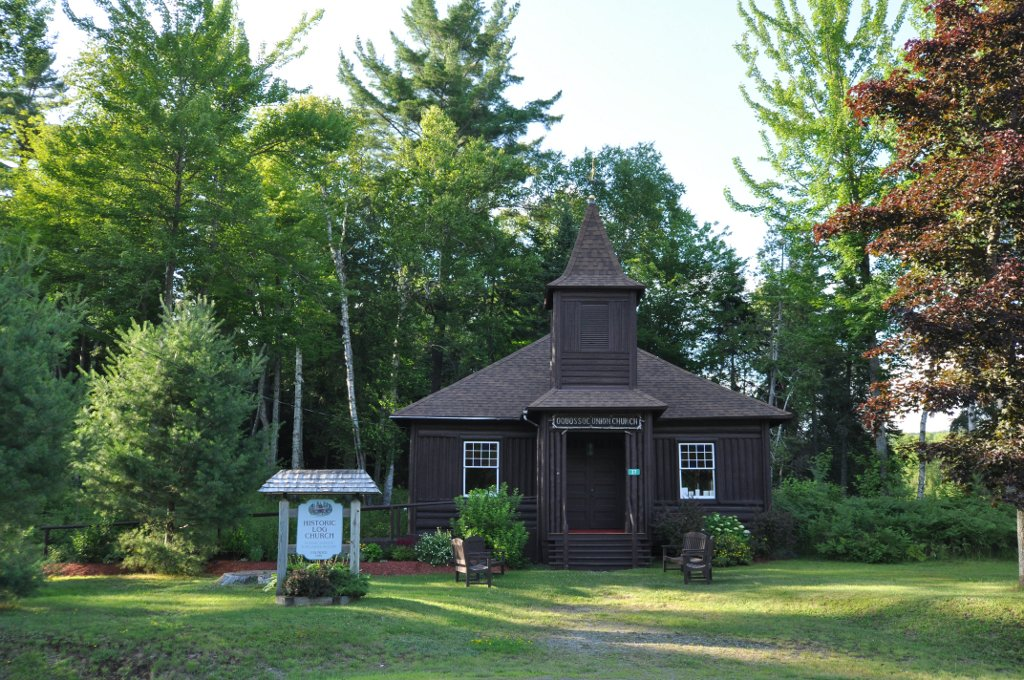

- Location within Maine Location within the United States
- Nearest city: Rangeley, Maine
- Coordinates: 44°58′0″N 70°46′14″W
- Area: 0.3 acres (0.12 ha)
- Built: 1916
- Architect: Hayford, Anson
- NRHP reference No.: 84001368
- Added to NRHP: July 19, 1984

The Oquossoc Log Church (Oquossoc Union Church) is a historic non-denominational church on Maine State Route 4 in the Oquossoc village of Rangeley, Maine. Built in 1916, it is a unique structure, whose walls and major interior fixtures are all built out of spruce logs. It was listed on the National Register of Historic Places in 1984.

== Description and history ==
The Oquossoc Log Church is set on the north side of Carry Road (Maine State Route 4), a short way east of its junction with Maine State Route 17 in the village of Oquossoc, which is at the northwest corner of Rangeley Lake. It is a rectangular log structure, with a hip roof and a projecting entry vestibule topped by a small tower. The entry vestibule is open to the south, fashioned out of vertically-placed logs, and topped by a roof section that steps back to the belfry stage of the tower, which has louvered rectangular sections. The tower is topped by a pyramidal roof with flared eaves. The walls are fashioned out of horizontally-placed logs up to the base of the sash windows, and then by vertically-arranged logs between the windows and the corners. The building's interior fixtures, including the pulpit and altar, are also fashioned from spruce logs.

Funding for the church was raised by summer residents of the area in 1915, and construction of the building was completed in 1916 by Anson Hayford. Then as now, it provided summer residents a place to have non-denomination religious services.

== See also ==
- National Register of Historic Places listings in Franklin County, Maine
