= Tufts House (Farmington, Maine) =

Historic house in Maine, United States

- U.S. National Register of Historic Places
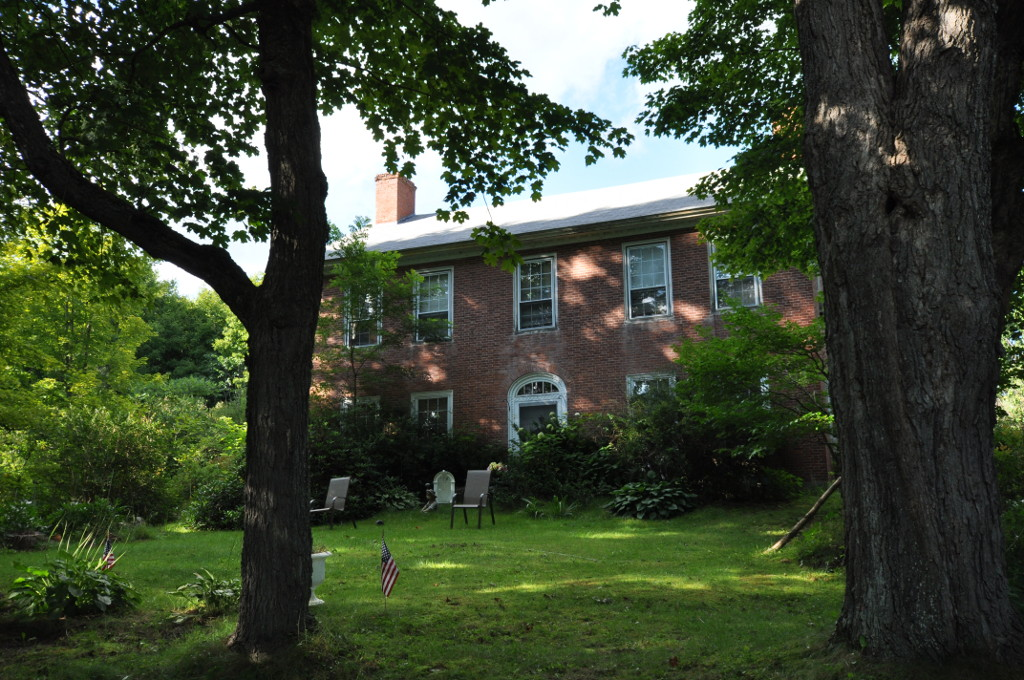

- Location within Maine Location within the United States
- Nearest city: Farmington, Maine
- Coordinates: 44°38′10″N 70°5′35″W
- Area: 1 acre (0.40 ha)
- Built: 1810
- Architect: Tufts, Francis
- Architectural style: Federal
- NRHP reference No.: 79000130
- Added to NRHP: May 8, 1979

The Tufts House is a historic house on United States Route 2 in Farmington, Maine. Built in 1810, it is one of the few brick buildings of the period in the region, and is a little-altered example of fine Federal style architecture. The house was listed on the National Register of Historic Places in 1979.

== Description and history ==
The Tufts House is set on the north side of US Route 2, a few miles southeast of the center of Farmington and a short way east of the road's junction with Dump Road. The house is a 2 1/2-story structure, predominantly fashioned from brick laid in Flemish bond. The gable ends of the half story are framed in wood and clapboarded. The house has a side gable roof with chimneys just inside either side. The front (south-facing) facade is five bays wide, symmetrically arranged, with the entrance set in an arched opening at the center. The entry is framed by delicately-carved woodwork and topped by a semi-oval transom window. The cornice line of the roof is finished with dentil moulding.

The house was built in 1810 by Francis Tufts, a veteran of the American Revolutionary War who hailed from Medford, Massachusetts and was one of Farmington's first proprietors. He first moved to the area 1780, living in a log house until 1781, when he built a frame house. In 1790 he negotiated the purchase of the territory that became Farmington, and was the owner of one of its early mills. He built this house, supposedly from bricks manufactured from clay gathered from the banks of the nearby Sandy River. The house has been little altered since its construction, the only significant alteration being the replacement of its windows. The house is an unusually fine example of Federal architecture for a comparatively remote and rural setting.

== See also ==
- National Register of Historic Places listings in Franklin County, Maine
