= Carthage, Maine =

Town in Maine, United States

- Town
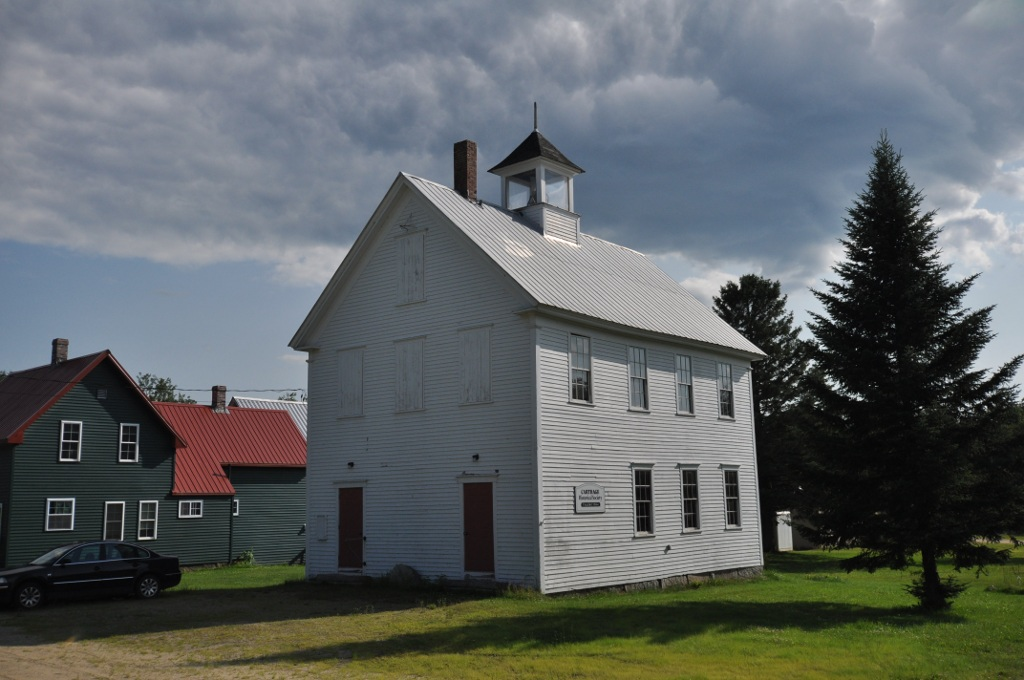
- Carthage Historical Society building

- Location within Maine Location within the United States
- Coordinates: 44°37′15″N 70°25′40″W
- Country: United States
- State: Maine
- County: Franklin
- Incorporated: 1826
- Villages: Carthage; Berry Mills; Tainter Corner

Area
  - Total: 33.46 sq mi (86.66 km^{2})
  - Land: 33.33 sq mi (86.32 km^{2})
  - Water: 0.13 sq mi (0.34 km^{2})
- Elevation: 794 ft (242 m)

Population (2020)
  - Total: 509
  - Density: 15/sq mi (5.9/km^{2})
- Time zone: UTC-5 (Eastern (EST))
  - Summer (DST): UTC-4 (EDT)
- ZIP Code: 04224
- Area code: 207
- FIPS code: 23-10915
- GNIS feature ID: 582393

Carthage is a town in Franklin County, Maine, United States. The population was 509 at the 2020 census.

== History ==
First known as Plantation No. 4, Abbott's Purchase, it was part of a large tract of land bought in 1815 by Jacob Abbott of Wilton, New Hampshire from Jonathan Phillips of Boston, who had purchased an even larger tract from the state of Massachusetts about 1790. Plantation No. 4 was noted for extensive forests of pine and valuable formations of limestone. In 1804, William Bowley and his family from Bristol, New Hampshire settled in Plantation No. 4, and with his brother Oliver and father Gideon, built the first sawmill at what was called Bowley's Mills on the Webb River at the foot of Webb Lake. They built a gristmill the following year.

The town was incorporated on February 20, 1826, and named after Carthage, the ancient Mediterranean city in what is today Tunisia in North Africa. In 1849, land was set off to form a new Plantation No. 4. By 1880, when the population was 507, Carthage had farms, two sawmills, a gristmill and a limestone quarry.

== Geography ==
According to the United States Census Bureau, the town has a total area of 33.46 square miles (86.66 km^{2}), of which 33.33 square miles (86.32 km^{2}) is land and 0.13 square miles (0.34 km^{2}) is water. Carthage is drained by the Webb River, which meanders south from Webb Lake to join the Androscoggin River. The town is situated in a valley between ranges of foothills and mountains.

The town is served by Maine State Route 142. It borders the towns of Weld to the north, Perkins Plantation, Plantation No. 4, Wilton and Temple to the east, and Mexico and Dixfield to the south in Oxford County.

== Demographics ==
Historical population
Census	Pop.	Note	%±
1830	333		—
1840	522		56.8%
1850	420		−19.5%
1860	503		19.8%
1870	486		−3.4%
1880	507		4.3%
1890	390		−23.1%
1900	334		−14.4%
1910	292		−12.6%
1920	282		−3.4%
1930	247		−12.4%
1940	281		13.8%
1950	339		20.6%
1960	370		9.1%
1970	354		−4.3%
1980	438		23.7%
1990	458		4.6%
2000	520		13.5%
2010	560		7.7%
2020	509		−9.1%
U.S. Decennial Census

=== 2010 census ===
As of the census of 2010, there were 560 people, 223 households, and 144 families living in the town. The population density was 16.8 inhabitants per square mile (6.5/km^{2}). There were 346 housing units at an average density of 10.4 per square mile (4.0/km^{2}). The racial makeup of the town was 97.1% White, 0.4% Asian, and 2.5% from two or more races. Hispanic or Latino of any race were 3.4% of the population.

There were 223 households, of which 28.7% had children under the age of 18 living with them, 49.8% were married couples living together, 8.1% had a female householder with no husband present, 6.7% had a male householder with no wife present, and 35.4% were non-families. 27.4% of all households were made up of individuals, and 10.3% had someone living alone who was 65 years of age or older. The average household size was 2.51 and the average family size was 3.01.

The median age in the town was 44.2 years. 21.4% of residents were under the age of 18; 7.9% were between the ages of 18 and 24; 22.3% were from 25 to 44; 35.8% were from 45 to 64; and 12.5% were 65 years of age or older. The gender makeup of the town was 53.6% male and 46.4% female.

=== 2000 census ===
As of the census of 2000, there were 520 people, 198 households, and 144 families living in the town. The population density was 15.7 inhabitants per square mile (6.1/km^{2}). There were 291 housing units at an average density of 8.8 per square mile (3.4/km^{2}). The racial makeup of the town was 97.31% White, 0.38% African American, 0.96% Native American, 0.19% Asian, 0.19% from other races, and 0.96% from two or more races. Hispanic or Latino of any race were 0.58% of the population.

There were 198 households, out of which 34.8% had children under the age of 18 living with them, 61.1% were married couples living together, 6.6% had a female householder with no husband present, and 26.8% were non-families. 19.7% of all households were made up of individuals, and 6.1% had someone living alone who was 65 years of age or older. The average household size was 2.63 and the average family size was 2.97.

In the town, the population was spread out, with 26.9% under the age of 18, 4.8% from 18 to 24, 33.1% from 25 to 44, 23.1% from 45 to 64, and 12.1% who were 65 years of age or older. The median age was 36 years. For every 100 females, there were 115.8 males. For every 100 females age 18 and over, there were 109.9 males.

The median income for a household in the town was $29,773, and the median income for a family was $32,917. Males had a median income of $30,625 versus $16,964 for females. The per capita income for the town was $12,169. About 8.2% of families and 12.8% of the population were below the poverty line, including 17.4% of those under age 18 and none of those age 65 or over.

== Site of interest ==
- Carthage Historical Society & Museum

== Notable person ==
- Hiram Pitt Bennet, Congressional delegate from the Territory of Colorado and Colorado Secretary of State
