= Dixfield, Maine =

Town in Maine, United States

- Town
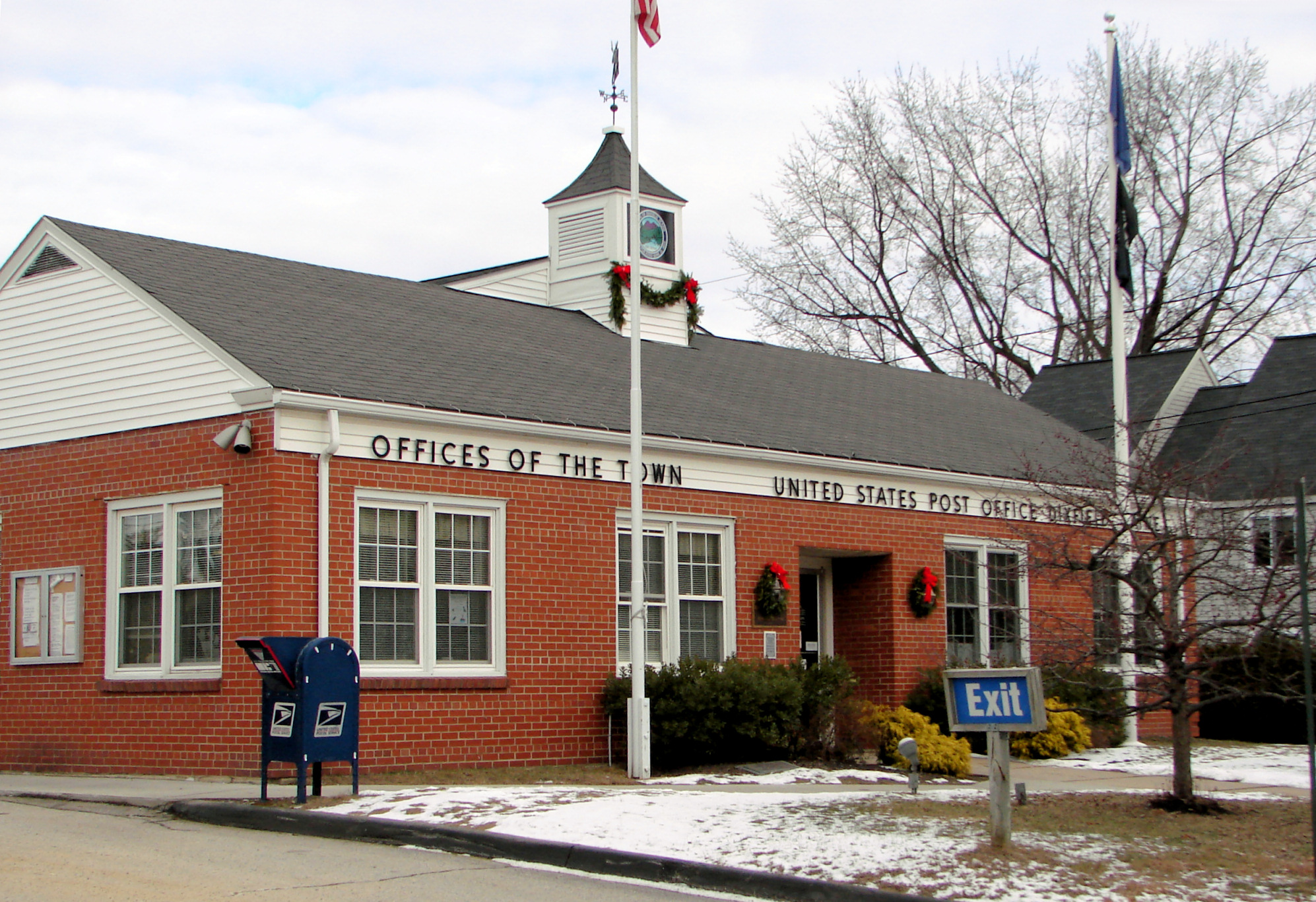
- Dixfield town hall and post office

- Seal
- Motto: The Only One
- Interactive map of Dixfield, Maine
- Coordinates: 44°31′13″N 70°21′30″W
- Country: United States
- State: Maine
- County: Oxford County
- Incorporated: June 21, 1803

Area
  - Total: 41.69 sq mi (107.98 km^{2})
  - Land: 41.27 sq mi (106.89 km^{2})
  - Water: 0.42 sq mi (1.09 km^{2})
- Elevation: 715 ft (218 m)

Population (2020)
  - Total: 2,253
  - Density: 55/sq mi (21.1/km^{2})
- Time zone: UTC-5 (Eastern (EST))
  - Summer (DST): UTC-4 (EDT)
- ZIP Codes: 04224 (Dixfield); 04227 (East Dixfield)
- GNIS feature ID: 582443
- Website: dixfield.org

Dixfield is a town in Oxford County, Maine, United States. Dixfield is included in the Lewiston-Auburn, Maine metropolitan New England City and Town Area. The population was 2,253 at the 2020 census. The town motto of Dixfield is "The Only One", because it is the only town in the world to claim that name. Dr. Elijeh Dix, a substantial landowner in the area, bought the town (and Dixmont) which bears his name. Dixfield contains a census-designated place of the same name.

== History ==
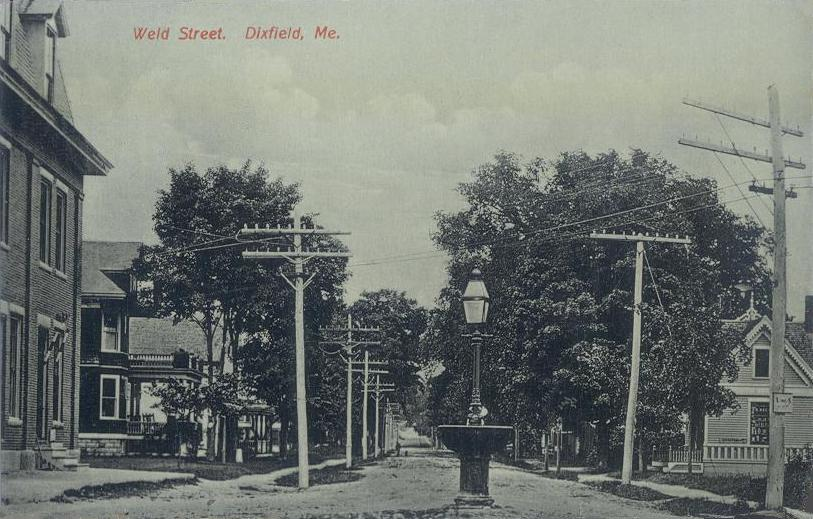
Weld Street in 1911

The Massachusetts General Court granted the township in 1789 to Colonel Jonathan Holman of Sutton, Massachusetts (now Millbury), an American Revolutionary War veteran, together with 25 others. In 1795, the first permanent settlers arrived with their families—John Marble, Gardner Brown, Amos Trask, Levi Newton, David Torrey and John Gould. It was called Holmantown Plantation until part of it was incorporated on June 21, 1803, as Dixfield, the 147th town in Maine (the remainder of the plantation would be incorporated in 1818 as Mexico). Dr. Elijah Dix of Boston, a substantial landowner in the area, promised to donate a library for the town if the citizens changed its name from Holmantown to Dixfield. The citizens complied, after which the town received dusty old boxes of medical books printed in German. Dr. Dix also left his name on Dixmont, where he died while visiting in 1809 and was buried.

With several streams for water power, Dixfield developed into a small mill town. It had sawmills and gristmills. It also produced cheese, carriages, shingles, toothpicks, rakes, wooden boxes, flies and leaders, boots and shoes. Dixfield once had a marble works.

== Geography ==
According to the United States Census Bureau, the town has a total area of 41.69 square miles (107.98 km^{2}), of which 41.27 square miles (106.89 km^{2}) is land and 0.42 square miles (1.09 km^{2}) is water. Dixfield is drained by Newton Brook, the Webb River and the Androscoggin River. U.S. Route 2 passes through the town.

The Webb River forms the line between Dixfield and Mexico. It rises from the brooks in Weld, through the wetlands in Carthage, to meet the Androscoggin at Dixfield Village.

== Demographics ==
Historical population
Census	Pop.	Note	%±
1810	403		—
1820	595		47.6%
1830	889		49.4%
1840	1,169		31.5%
1850	1,180		0.9%
1860	1,181		0.1%
1870	1,049		−11.2%
1880	913		−13.0%
1890	988		8.2%
1900	1,052		6.5%
1910	1,056		0.4%
1920	1,134		7.4%
1930	1,521		34.1%
1940	1,790		17.7%
1950	2,022		13.0%
1960	2,323		14.9%
1970	2,188		−5.8%
1980	2,389		9.2%
1990	2,574		7.7%
2000	2,514		−2.3%
2010	2,550		1.4%
2020	2,253		−11.6%
U.S. Decennial Census

=== 2010 census ===
As of the census of 2010, there were 2,550 people, 1,044 households, and 722 families living in the town. The population density was 61.8 inhabitants per square mile (23.9/km^{2}). There were 1,180 housing units at an average density of 28.6 per square mile (11.0/km^{2}). The racial makeup of the town was 96.9% White, 0.2% African American, 0.2% Native American, 0.7% Asian, 0.2% from other races, and 1.8% from two or more races. Hispanic or Latino of any race were 0.7% of the population.

There were 1,044 households, of which 34.2% had children under the age of 18 living with them, 50.8% were married couples living together, 12.1% had a female householder with no husband present, 6.3% had a male householder with no wife present, and 30.8% were non-families. 23.7% of all households were made up of individuals, and 9.7% had someone living alone who was 65 years of age or older. The average household size was 2.44 and the average family size was 2.84.

The median age in the town was 41.9 years. 24.8% of residents were under the age of 18; 6.5% were between the ages of 18 and 24; 23.2% were from 25 to 44; 29.7% were from 45 to 64; and 15.9% were 65 years of age or older. The gender makeup of the town was 48.1% male and 51.9% female.

=== 2000 census ===
As of the census of 2000, there were 2,514 people, 1,011 households, and 721 families living in the town. The population density was 61.0 inhabitants per square mile (23.6/km^{2}). There were 1,118 housing units at an average density of 27.1 per square mile (10.5/km^{2}). The racial makeup of the town was 98.29% White, 0.20% Native American, 0.52% Asian, 0.24% from other races, and 0.76% from two or more races. Hispanic or Latino of any race were 0.80% of the population.

There were 1,011 households, out of which 32.6% had children under the age of 18 living with them, 56.2% were married couples living together, 10.7% had a female householder with no husband present, and 28.6% were non-families. 23.6% of all households were made up of individuals, and 11.3% had someone living alone who was 65 years of age or older. The average household size was 2.47 and the average family size was 2.88.

In the town, the population was spread out, with 26.7% under the age of 18, 5.1% from 18 to 24, 27.5% from 25 to 44, 25.9% from 45 to 64, and 14.9% who were 65 years of age or older. The median age was 40 years. For every 100 females, there were 92.8 males. For every 100 females age 18 and over, there were 91.7 males.

The median income for a household in the town was $36,563, and the median income for a family was $41,979. Males had a median income of $36,413 versus $21,563 for females. The per capita income for the town was $15,684. About 8.0% of families and 11.7% of the population were below the poverty line, including 14.6% of those under age 18 and 18.6% of those age 65 or over.

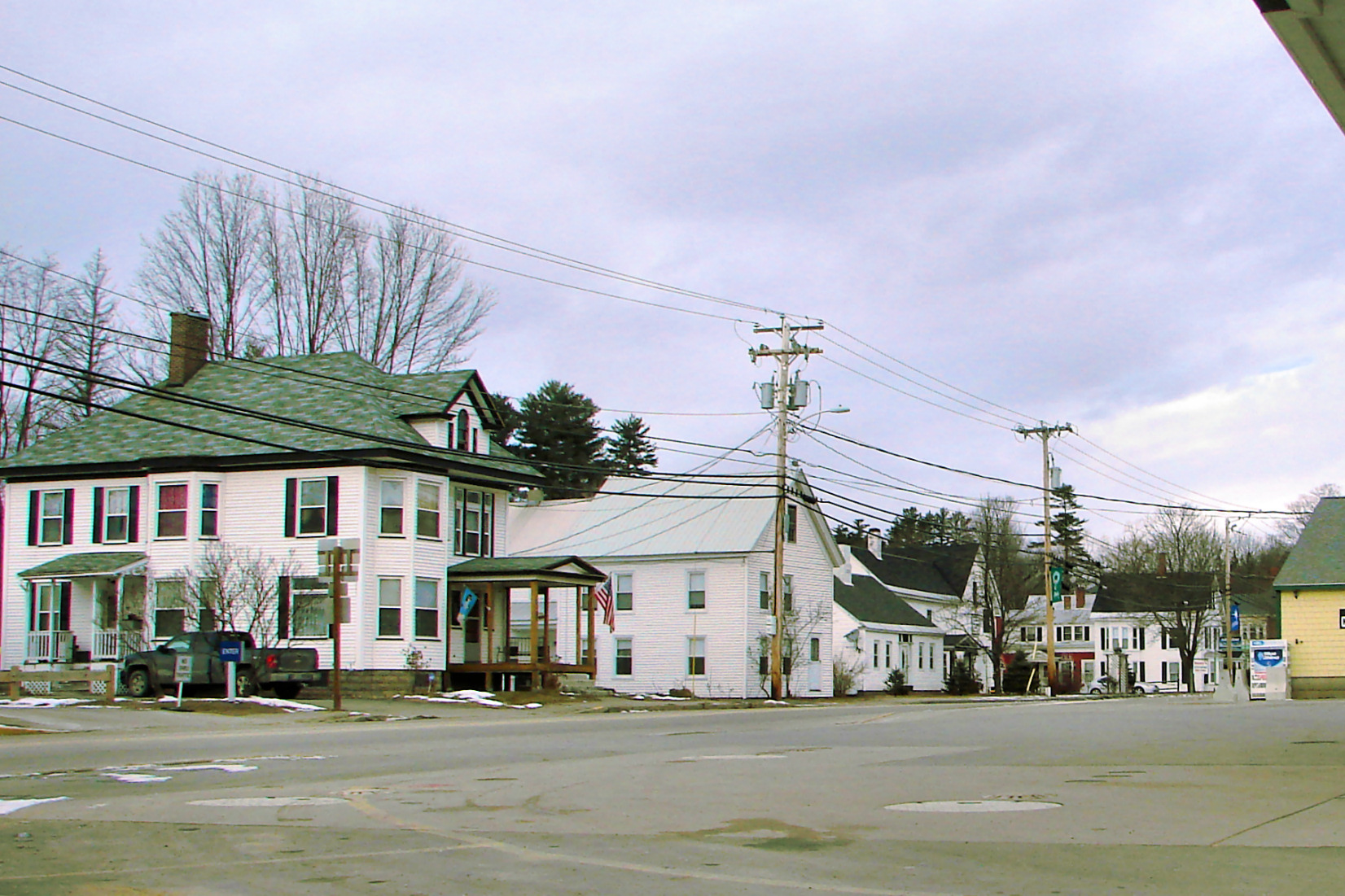
Dixfield town center

== Sites of interest ==
- Dixfield Historical Society & Museum
- Mainely Critters Wildlife Museum
- Dixfield Tuscan Opera House
- Church on the Hill
- Dixfield Moose; Legend of Bullrock

== Education ==
The town has two schools, TW Kelly Middle School and the Dirigo High School. The mascot is the cougar and the school color is blue. The middle school consists of grades 6–8 and the high school consists of grades 9–12. It was a part of RSU10 but is now currently part of RSU56.

== Notable people ==
- Mace Greenleaf, stage and screen actor
- Sebastian Streeter Marble, US congressman
- Gideon Ellis Newman, Wisconsin State Assemblyman
- Leonard Trask, suffered from a broken neck that healed improperly, was diagnosed post mortem with the first known case of ankylosing spondylitis
