= Coplin Plantation, Maine =

- Plantation
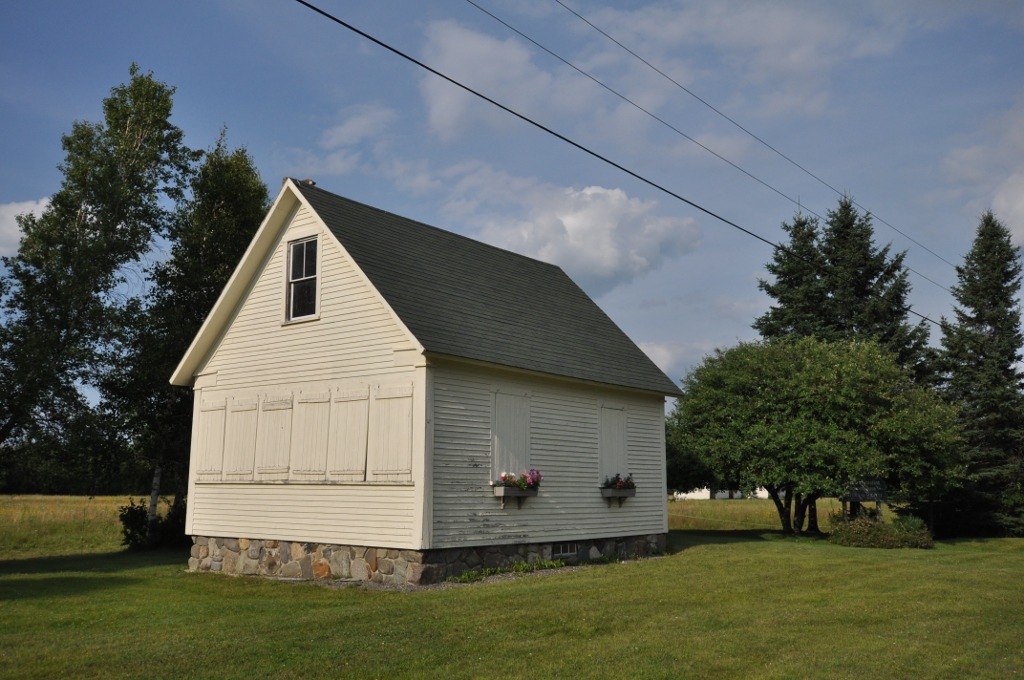
- The former Coplin Plantation Schoolhouse

- Location within Maine Location within the United States
- Coordinates: 45°06′35″N 70°28′52″W
- Country: United States
- State: Maine
- County: Franklin

Area
  - Total: 33 sq mi (86 km^{2})
  - Land: 33 sq mi (86 km^{2})
  - Water: 0 sq mi (0 km^{2})
- Elevation: 1,368 ft (417 m)

Population (2020)
  - Total: 131
  - Density: 3.9/sq mi (1.5/km^{2})
- Time zone: UTC-5 (Eastern (EST))
  - Summer (DST): UTC-4 (EDT)
- ZIP Codes: 04970 (Rangeley); 04982 (Stratton)
- Area code: 207
- FIPS code: 23-14205
- GNIS feature ID: 582418
- Website: www.coplinplantation.maine.gov

Coplin Plantation is a plantation in Franklin County, Maine, United States. The population was 131 at the 2020 census.

== Geography ==
According to the United States Census Bureau, the plantation has a total area of 33.1 square miles (86 km^{2}), all land.

== Demographics ==
Historical population
Census	Pop.	Note	%±
1860	301		—
1870	69		−77.1%
1880	79		14.5%
1890	71		−10.1%
1900	70		−1.4%
1910	81		15.7%
1920	177		118.5%
1930	69		−61.0%
1940	54		−21.7%
1950	64		18.5%
1960	40		−37.5%
1970	50		25.0%
1980	111		122.0%
1990	120		8.1%
2000	135		12.5%
2010	166		23.0%
2020	131		−21.1%
U.S. Decennial Census

As of the census of 2000, there were 135 people, 58 households, and 37 families residing in the plantation. The population density was 4.1 inhabitants per square mile (1.6/km^{2}). There were 160 housing units at an average density of 4.8 per square mile (1.9/km^{2}). The racial makeup of the plantation was 99.26% White, and 0.74% from two or more races.

There were 58 households, out of which 34.5% had children under the age of 18 living with them, 53.4% were married couples living together, 5.2% had a female householder with no husband present, and 36.2% were non-families. 24.1% of all households were made up of individuals, and 6.9% had someone living alone who was 65 years of age or older. The average household size was 2.33 and the average family size was 2.78.

In the plantation the population was spread out, with 23.7% under the age of 18, 2.2% from 18 to 24, 31.1% from 25 to 44, 28.1% from 45 to 64, and 14.8% who were 65 years of age or older. The median age was 41 years. For every 100 females, there were 121.3 males. For every 100 females age 18 and over, there were 123.9 males.

The median income for a household in the plantation was $27,500, and the median income for a family was $29,063. Males had a median income of $36,250 versus $17,321 for females. The per capita income for the plantation was $13,490. There were 15.8% of families and 13.6% of the population living below the poverty line, including 23.9% of under eighteens and 7.4% of those over 64.
