= Union Church (Phillips, Maine) =

Historic church in Maine, United States

- U.S. National Register of Historic Places
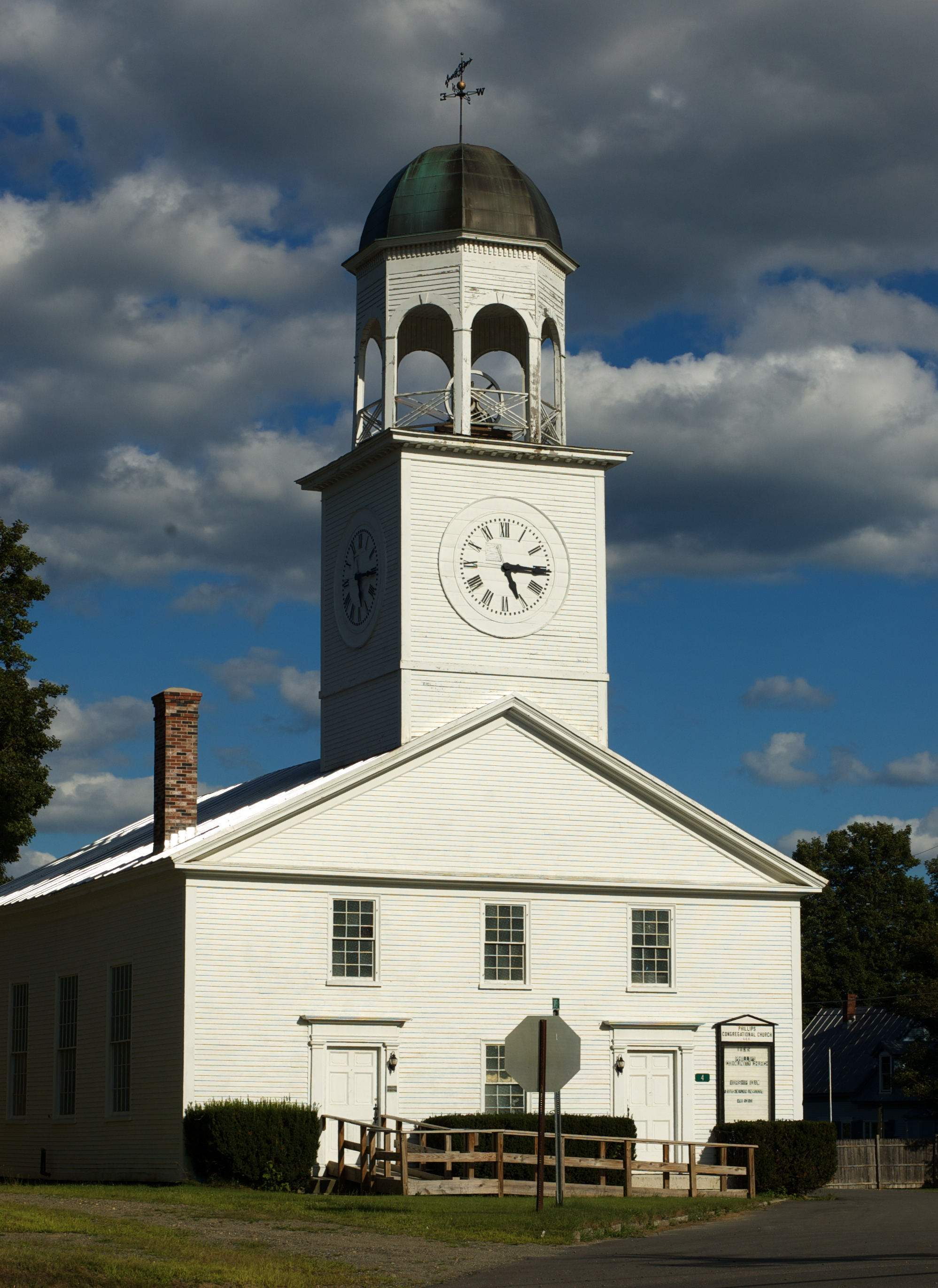

- Location within Maine Location within the United States
- Location: Main and Pleasant Sts., Phillips, Maine
- Coordinates: 44°49′24″N 70°20′23″W
- Area: less than one acre
- Built: 1835
- Architectural style: Greek Revival
- NRHP reference No.: 89000844
- Added to NRHP: July 13, 1989

The Union Church, now Phillips Congregational Church, is a historic church on Main and Pleasant Streets in Phillips, Maine. Built in 1835, this Greek Revival church is the oldest religious building in the small community, and a distinctive local landmark. It was listed on the National Register of Historic Places in 1989.

== Description and history ==
The Phillips Congregational Church is set just east of the junction of Main and Pleasant Streets, occupying a prominent location in the center of the main village of Phillips, Maine. It is a rectangular wood-frame building, with a front-gable roof, clapboard siding, and a granite stone foundation. The building's most prominent feature is its tall two-stage tower, which rises above the front facade. The first stage is square, with clock faces in the sides. A cornice separates this stage from the octagonal open belfry, which has round-arch openings. An octagonal cupola and weather vane cap the tower. The main facade is three bays wide, symmetrically arrange with a pair of entrances in the outer bays and sash windows in the other bays. The entrances are framed by simple pilasters and entablatures with cornices.

The interior begins with a foyer, which opens into a nave with two aisles separating three rows of bench pews. The rear wall of the nave has a semi-circular indentation, where a wood stove once stood to provide heat to the building. The second-level gallery has largely been enclosed.

The church was built in 1835, and is one of two surviving 19th-century churches in town (the other is the 1867 Gothic Revival Methodist church). The church was funded by three local congregations, representing Free Will Baptists, Universalists, and Congregationalists. Ownership was shared between these three groups until 1931, when the Congregationalists acquired full ownership of the building. The only significant alterations to the building were the removal of its belfry in 1939 due to deterioration; it was restored in 1982 with plans drafted from historic photographs of the original.

== See also ==
- National Register of Historic Places listings in Franklin County, Maine
