= Webb River =

Coordinates: 44.53117°N 70.45951°W

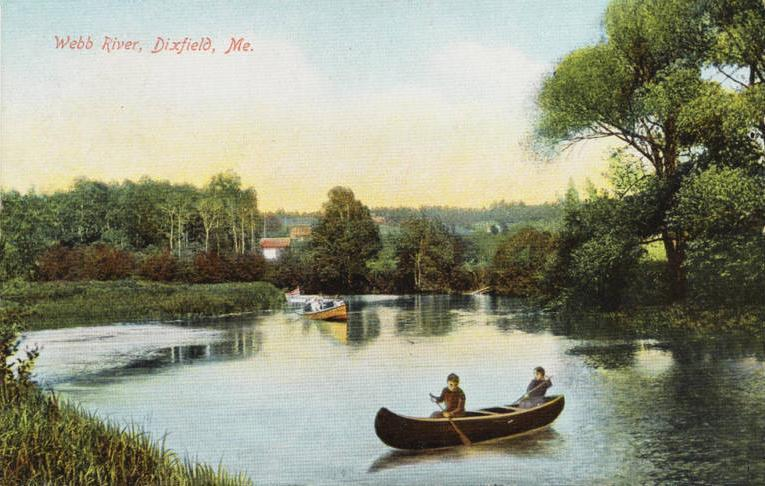
- Scene at Dixfield in 1910

Location
- Country: United States

Physical characteristics
- Source
  - location: Maine

The Webb River is a 16.8-mile-long (27.0 km) river in western Maine. It is a tributary of the Androscoggin River, which flows to the Kennebec River and ultimately the Atlantic Ocean.

The Webb River begins at the outlet of Webb Lake near the southern border of the town of Weld and flows south, quickly entering the town of Carthage, where it turns southwest, then south again. The southernmost 6 miles (10 km) of the river forms the boundary between the towns of Mexico and Dixfield. The river enters the Androscoggin just west of the village of Dixfield. The entire course of the river is paralleled by Maine Route 142.

== See also ==
- List of rivers of Maine
