= East Central Franklin, Maine =

- Unorganized territory
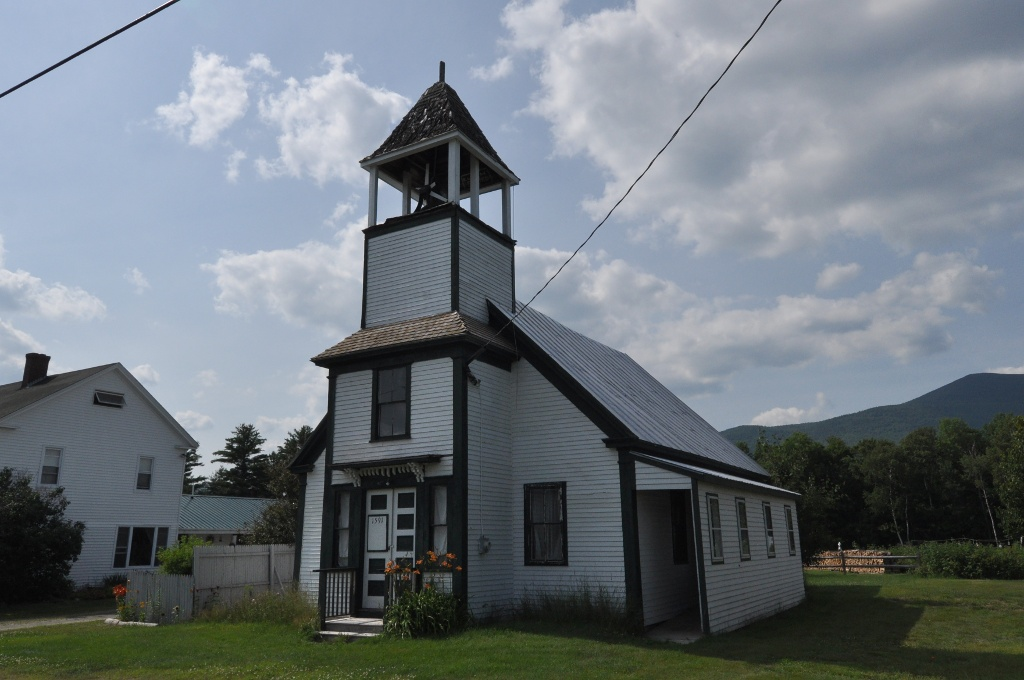
- The former town house of Salem, Maine

- Location within Maine Location within the United States
- Coordinates: 44°58′43″N 70°16′45″W
- Country: United States
- State: Maine
- County: Franklin

Area
  - Total: 128.9 sq mi (333.8 km^{2})
  - Land: 128.8 sq mi (333.5 km^{2})
  - Water: 0.15 sq mi (0.4 km^{2})
- Elevation: 1,906 ft (581 m)

Population (2020)
  - Total: 805
  - Density: 6.25/sq mi (2.41/km^{2})
- Time zone: UTC-5 (Eastern (EST))
  - Summer (DST): UTC-4 (EDT)
- ZIP Codes: 04983 (Strong); 04966 (Phillips)
- Area code: 207
- FIPS code: 23-19865
- GNIS feature ID: 582453

East Central Franklin is an unorganized territory in Franklin County, Maine, United States. The population was 805 at the 2020 census.

== Geography ==
According to the United States Census Bureau, the unorganized territory has a total area of 128.9 square miles (333.8 km^{2}), of which 128.8 square miles (333.5 km^{2}) is land and 0.1 square mile (0.4 km^{2}) (0.11%) is water.

The territory consists of five townships, which are Reddington, Mt. Abram, Salem, Freeman, and Madrid. Salem, Freeman and Madrid are all former towns that were incorporated in the 19th century, and disincorporated in 1945, 1938 and 2000, respectively.

== Demographics ==
Historical population
Census	Pop.	Note	%±
1980	2		—
1990	459		22,850.0%
2000	526		14.6%
2010	808		53.6%
2020	805		−0.4%
U.S. Decennial Census

As of the census of 2000, there were 526 people, 210 households, and 149 families residing in the unorganized territory. The population density was 4.1 inhabitants per square mile (1.6/km^{2}). There were 350 housing units at an average density of 2.7 per square mile (1.0/km^{2}). The racial makeup of the unorganized territory was 95.82% White, 0.19% Black or African American, 1.71% Native American, 0.76% Asian, and 1.52% from two or more races.

There were 210 households, out of which 31.9% had children under the age of 18 living with them, 59.5% were married couples living together, 7.1% had a female householder with no husband present, and 29.0% were non-families. 21.9% of all households were made up of individuals, and 6.2% had someone living alone who was 65 years of age or older. The average household size was 2.50 and the average family size was 2.91.

In the unorganized territory the population was spread out, with 26.4% under the age of 18, 5.3% from 18 to 24, 28.5% from 25 to 44, 27.6% from 45 to 64, and 12.2% who were 65 years of age or older. The median age was 40 years. For every 100 females, there were 99.2 males. For every 100 females age 18 and over, there were 98.5 males.

The median income for a household in the unorganized territory was $33,529, and the median income for a family was $37,500. Males had a median income of $31,250 versus $20,000 for females. The per capita income for the unorganized territory was $15,403. About 12.8% of families and 13.8% of the population were below the poverty line, including 26.1% of those under age 18 and 9.0% of those age 65 or over.

== Education ==
The Maine Department of Education is responsible for school assignments in unorganized territories. It assigns schools in Salem to Maine School Administrative District 58: Kingfield Elementary School, Phillips Elementary School, Strong Elementary School, and Mt. Abram High School.
