= Madrid, Maine =

- Disincorporated town
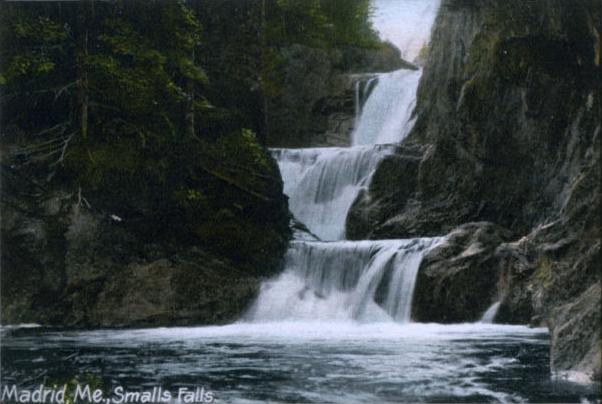
- Small's Falls c. 1907
- Interactive map of Madrid, Maine
- Coordinates: 44°53′4″N 70°26′18″W
- Country: United States
- State: Maine
- County: Franklin
- Incorporated: 1836
- Disincorporated: 2000

Area
  - Total: 41.8 sq mi (108.2 km^{2})
  - Land: 41.7 sq mi (108.1 km^{2})
  - Water: 0.077 sq mi (0.2 km^{2})
- Elevation: 1,165 ft (355 m)

Population (2000)
  - Total: 173
  - Density: 4.1/sq mi (1.6/km^{2})
- Time zone: UTC-5 (Eastern (EST))
  - Summer (DST): UTC-4 (EDT)
- ZIP Code: 04966
- Area code: 207
- FIPS code: 23-42765
- GNIS feature ID: 0582577

Madrid (/ˈmædrɪd/, MAD-rid) is a former town, now a part of the unorganized territory of East Central Franklin, in Franklin County, Maine, United States. The population was 173 at the 2000 census.

== History ==
It was part of an extensive tract of land purchased from Massachusetts about 1790 by Jonathan Phillips of Boston, then acquired by his agent, Jacob Abbott from Wilton, New Hampshire. First settled about 1807 or 1808, it was incorporated as a town in 1836 and named after Madrid, Spain. In 1854, it was the site of Maine's first gold strike.

Although Madrid's northern topography is mountainous, other parts suited cultivation. In 1837, when the population was 351, farms harvested 3,387 bushels of wheat.

Industry developed because the falls in the Sandy River provided water power for mills: these included three sawmills, a gristmill, two clapboard machines, and two shingle machines. The town was noted for producing lumber and carriages. By 1859, the population was 404. In 1880, it had reached 437.

But in the late 20th century, the population declined, as industry changed and the young moved to larger cities. In April 2000, the town of Madrid disincorporated. Citing "apathy", its government was dissolved, and Madrid became part of the unorganized territory of East Central Franklin.

== Geography ==
According to the United States Census Bureau, the town has a total area of 108.2 km^{2} (41.8 sq mi), of which 108.1 km^{2} (41.7 sq mi) is land and 0.2 km^{2} (0.077 sq mi) (0.14%) is water. Madrid is drained by the head branches of the Sandy River, a tributary of the Kennebec River. Much of the topography is uneven, with the northern portion mountainous. The Appalachian Trail crosses the northwest corner of the town.

The former town is crossed by Maine State Route 4. It bordered the towns of Phillips to the south, with the unorganized territory of East Central Franklin to the north and east.

== Demographics ==
As of the census of 2000, there were 173 people, 72 households, and 55 families residing in the town. The population density was 1.6 people/km^{2} (4.1 people/mi^{2}). There were 208 housing units at an average density of 1.9 units/km^{2} (4.9 units/mi^{2}). The racial makeup of the town was 100.00% White.

There were 72 households, out of which 27.8% had children under the age of 18 living with them, 65.3% were married couples living together, 5.6% had a female householder with no husband present, and 23.6% were non-families. 18.1% of all households were made up of individuals, and 5.6% had someone living alone who was 65 years of age or older. The average household size was 2.40 and the average family size was 2.71.

In the town the population was spread out, with 23.7% under the age of 18, 3.5% from 18 to 24, 27.7% from 25 to 44, 34.1% from 45 to 64, and 11.0% who were 65 years of age or older. The median age was 42 years. For every 100 females, there were 96.6 males. For every 100 females age 18 and over, there were 94.1 males.

The median income for a household in the town was $22,292, and the median income for a family was $29,063. Males had a median income of $16,563 versus $16,429 for females. The per capita income for the town was $12,192. None of the families and 5.5% of the population were living below the poverty line, including no under eighteens and 29.4% of those over 64.

== Education ==
The Maine Department of Education takes responsibility for coordinating school assignments in the unorganized territories. The state assigns Madrid to Maine School Administrative District 58, to Kingfield Elementary School, Phillips Elementary School, Strong Elementary School, and/or Mt. Abram High School.

== See also ==
- Madrid Railroad

== Sites of interest ==
- Madrid Historical Society & Museum
- Smalls Falls
- Reeds Mill Church Only church built in Madrid, 1892
