= Abbott (surname) =

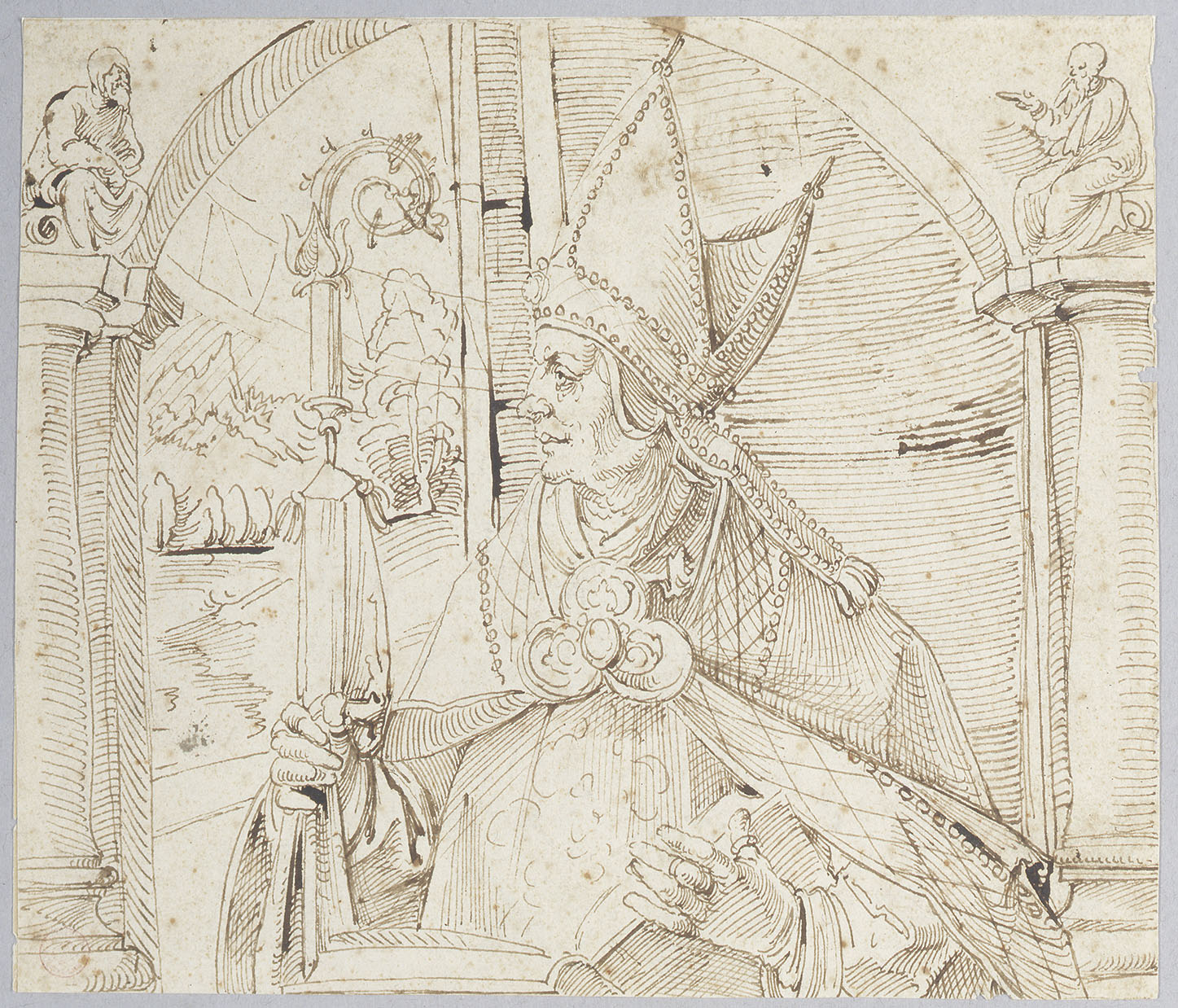
- The Abbot of the Convent of Saint Giles of Nuremberg, drawing by Hans von Kulmbach, 1511
- Language: English

Origin
- Meaning: Relating to abbots

Abbott, also spelled Abbot, is an English surname, derived from the word "abbot", which may refer to:

== A ==
- Abiel Abbot (1770–1828), American pastor
- Alan Abbott (1926–2008), English cricketer
- Alfred N. Abbott (1862–1929), American farmer and politician
- Alice Balch Abbot (1867–1937), American writer
- Amos Abbott (1786–1868), American Congressman
- Anderson Ruffin Abbott (1837–1913), Canadian physician
- Anne Abbott (1808–1908), American designer and writer
- Anthony Abbott (1930–2023), Canadian politician
- Aubrey Abbott (1886–1975), Australian politician
- Augustus Abbott (1804–1867), British army officer
- Austin Abbott (1831–1896), American lawyer and academic

== B ==
- Bec Abbot (born 1971), Canadian singer
- Belle K. Abbott (1842–1893), American author
- Benjamin Abbot (1762–1849), American schoolteacher
- Benjamin Abbott (1732–1796), American evangelist
- Benjamin Vaughan Abbott (1830–1890), American lawyer and author
- Berenice Abbott (1898–1991), American photographer
- Bert Abbott (footballer) (1875–1911), English footballer
- Bob Abbott (1932–2010), justice of the Kansas Supreme Court
- Brad Abbott (born 1994), English footballer
- Brenden Abbott (born 1962), aka the Postcard Bandit, Australian bank robber
- Brian Abbot (1911–1936), Australian actor
- Bruce Abbott (born 1954), American actor
- Bud Abbott (1897–1974), American actor
- Burton Abbott (1928–1957), American convicted of murder

== C ==
- Caleb F. Abbott (1811–1855), Canadian politician
- Cecil Abbott (1924–2014), Australian police commissioner
- Cecilia Abbott (born 1959), First Lady of Texas and wife of Greg Abbott
- Charles Abbot (disambiguation)
- Charles Abbott (disambiguation)
- Chauncey M. Abbott (1822–1863), American politician
- Chris Abbott (born 1947), American television producer, writer and author
- Christopher Abbott (born 1986), American actor
- Clara Abbott (1857–1924), corporate director of Abbott Laboratories from 1900 to 1908 and from 1911 to 1924
- Cory Abbott (born 1995), American baseball player
- Courtney Abbot (born 1989), New Zealand-born actress

== D ==
- Dan Abbott (1862–1930), American baseball player
- Daniel Abbott (1682–1760), Deputy Governor of colony of Rhode Island
- Darrell Lance Abbott (1966–2004), birth name of American guitarist known as Dimebag Darrell
- David Abbott (disambiguation)
- Delila (Richards) Abbott (1908–1998), American politician
- Dennis Abbott (born 1941), American politician
- Derek Abbott (born 1960), English physicist and electronic engineer
- Diahnne Abbott (born 1945), American actress and singer
- Diane Abbott (born 1953), British politician, former Shadow Home Secretary
- Dorian Abbot, American geophysicist
- Dorothy Abbott (1920–1968), American actress
- Douglas Abbott (1899–1987), Canadian politician
- Drew Abbott (born 1947), American musician

== E ==
- Edith Abbott (1876–1957), American social worker, educator and author
- Edville Gerhardt Abbott (1871–1938), American orthopædic surgeon
- Edward Abbott (disambiguation)
- Edwin Hale Abbot (1834–1927), American lawyer and railroad executive
- Edwin Abbott (disambiguation)
- Eleanor Hallowell Abbott (1872–1958), American author
- Elenore Abbott (1875–1935), American book illustrator, scenic designer and artist
- Eli Abbott (1869–1943), American college sports coach
- Emma Abbott (1849–1891), American singer
- Eric Symes Abbott (1906–1983), English clergyman
- Evelyn Abbott (1843–1901), English classical scholar
- Ezra Abbot (1819–1884), American Biblical scholar

== F ==
- Faye Abbott (1895–1965), American football player
- Francis Ellingwood Abbot (1836–1903), American philosopher and theologian
- Frank Abbott (disambiguation)
- Fred Abbott (1874–1935), American baseball player
- Frederick Abbott (disambiguation)
- Fredric Abbott (1928–1996), Australian actor

== G ==
- George Abbot (author) (c. 1603 – 1648), English writer
- George Abbot (bishop) (1562–1633), English clergyman
- George Abbotts or Abbot (1602–1645), MP for Gilford in the Short and Long parliaments, nephew of the Archbishop George Abbot
- George Abbott (disambiguation)
- Glenn Abbott (born 1951), American baseball player
- Gordon Abbott (1914–1986), Australian rules footballer
- Gorham Dummer Abbott (1807–1874), American clergyman, educator and author
- Grace Abbott (1878–1939), American social worker
- Greg Abbott (born 1957), American lawyer and politician, Attorney General of Texas, Governor of Texas
- Greg Abbott (footballer) (born 1963), English footballer
- Gregory Abbott (born 1954), American soul musician, singer, composer and producer
- Gypsy Abbott (1887–1952), American actress

== H ==
- H. H. Abbott, Harold Henry Abbott (1891–1976), poet and headmaster
- Harold Abbott (artist) (1906–1986), Australian portrait painter, official war artist and art teacher
- Harold Abbott (rugby union) (1882–1971), New Zealand rugby union footballer
- Helen Abbott Michael (1857–1904), née Abbott, American chemist
- Henry Abbot (martyr) (died 1597), English Catholic martyr
- Henry Larcom Abbot (1831–1927), American military engineer
- Henry Abbott (disambiguation)
- Herbert Edward Stacy Abbott (1814–1883), British general
- Horace Abbott (1806–1887), American manufacturer

== I ==
- Ira Abbott (1906–1988), American aerospace engineer

== J ==
- Jack Abbott
- Jacob Abbott (1803–1879), American writer
- Jacqui Abbott (born 1973), English singer
- James Abbott (disambiguation)
- Jeff Abbott (born 1963), American novelist
- Jeff Abbott (baseball) (born 1972), American baseball player
- Jennifer Abbott (born 1965), Canadian director, cinematographer and editor
- Jeremy Abbott (born 1985), American figure skater
- Jere Abbott (1897–1982), American art historian
- Jerry Abbott (1942–2024), American songwriter and record producer
- Jim Abbott (disambiguation)
- Jo Abbott (1840–1908), American politician
- Joan Stevenson Abbott (1899–1975), Australian army matron
- Job Abbott (1845–1896), Canadian civil engineer
- Joe Abbott (Australian politician) (1891–1965), Australian politician
- Joe Abbott (speedway rider) (1902–1950), English motorcycle racer
- Joel Abbot (naval officer) (1793–1855), American naval officer
- Joel Abbot (politician) (1776–1826), American politician
- John Abbot (entomologist) (1751–1840/1), American entomologist
- John Abbott (disambiguation)
- Josiah Gardner Abbott (1814–1891), American politician
- Joseph Abbott (disambiguation)
- Jude Abbott (born 1962), British musician

== K ==
- Karen Abbott (born 1973), American author of historical non-fiction
- Kurt Abbott (born 1969), American baseball player
- Kyle Abbott (baseball) (born 1968), former professional baseball player
- Kyle Abbott (cricketer) (born 1987), South African cricketer

== L ==
- Laura Abbot (born 1930s), American writer
- Lawrence Fraser Abbott (1859–1933), American editor and writer
- L. B. Abbott (1908–1985), American cinematographer, cameraman and special effects expert
- Lee K. Abbott (1947–2019), American writer
- Lemuel Abbott (1730–1776), English clergyman and poet
- Lemuel Francis Abbott (c. 1760 – 1802), English portrait painter
- Leonard Dalton Abbott (1878–1953), American publicist and radical thinker
- Lillian Elvira Moore Abbot (1870–1944), American painter
- Lyman Abbott (1835–1922), American religious leader and author

== M ==
- Mac Abbott (1877–1960), Australian politician
- Margaret Ives Abbott (1878–1955), American golfer
- Marguerite Elizabeth Abbott (1870–1953), American painter and teacher
- Mary Abbott (disambiguation)
- Maude Abbott (1869–1930), Canadian doctor
- Maurice Abbot (1565–1642), English merchant and politician
- Megan Abbott (born 1971), American writer
- Mishael Abbott (born 1981), American race car driver
- Monica Abbott (born 1985), American softball player

== N ==
- Nabia Abbott (1897–1981), American scholar of Islam
- Nathan Abbott (1854–1941), American lawyer and law teacher
- Nehemiah Abbott (1804–1877), American politician
- Nelson Abbott (born 1966), American politician
- Nick Abbot (born 1960), British radio presenter
- Norman Abbott (1922–2016), American television director

== O ==
- Ody Abbott (1888–1933), American baseball player
- Othman A. Abbott (1842–1935), Canadian-born American politician, first Lieutenant Governor of Nebraska

== P ==
- Pat Abbott (1912–1984), American golfer
- Patricia Kathleen Abbott (1913–1998), Australian veterinary pathologist
- Paul Abbott (disambiguation)
- Paweł Abbott (born 1982), English footballer
- Percy Abbott (Canadian politician) (1882–1942)
- Percy Abbott (Australian politician) (1869–1940), Australian politician, soldier and solicitor
- Percy Abbott (magician) (1886–1960), Australian magician and magic dealer
- Peter Abbott (1942–2015), British navy officer
- Philip Abbott (1923–1998), American character actor
- P. J. Abbott (born 1964), American race car driver

== R ==
- Rachel Abbott (born 1952), British author
- Reg Abbott (born 1930), Canadian ice hockey player
- Rhoda Abbott (1873–1946), English survivor of the Titanic sinking
- Richard Abbot (1818–1904), English poet
- Richard Abbott (architect) (1883–1954), New Zealand architect
- Richard Abbott (Australian politician) (1859–1940), Australian politician
- Robert Abbot (bishop) (1560–1617), Bishop of Salisbury
- Robert Abbot (theologian) (c. 1588 – c. 1662), Puritan theologian
- Robert Abbott (disambiguation)
- Roger Abbott (1946–2011), Canadian actor
- R. Tucker Abbott (1919–1995), American conchologist and malacologist
- Russ Abbot (born 1947), English musician, comedian and actor

== S ==
- Samuel Abbot (1786–1839), American inventor
- Samuel Warren Abbott (1837–1904), American physician
- Saunders Alexius Abbott (1811–1894), British general
- Scott Abbott (born 20th century), Canadian co-creator of board game Trivial Pursuit
- Sean Abbott (born 1992), Australian cricketer
- Senda Berenson Abbott (1868–1964), Lithuanian basketballer
- Shirley Abbott (ambassador) (1924–2013), American diplomat
- Shirley Abbott (author) (1934–2019), American writer and magazine editor
- Shirley Abbott (footballer) (1889–1947), English footballer
- Spencer Abbott (ice hockey) (born 1988), Canadian ice hockey player
- Steve Abbott (disambiguation)
- Stuart Abbot (born 1986), Scottish footballer
- Stuart Abbott (born 1978), South African rugby union player

== T ==
- Tank Abbott, American mixed martial artist David Abbott (born 1965)
- Tarnel Abbott (born 1953), American free-speech advocate, activist and librarian
- Theophilus C. Abbot (1826–1892), American college president
- Thomas Eastoe Abbott (1786–1854), English poet
- Thomas Kingsmill Abbott (1829–1913), Irish scholar and educator
- Thomas Abbott (priest), Irish priest, archdeacon of Cloyne (1919–1936)
- Tom Abbott (born 1981), British broadcaster and sports commentator
- Tom Abbott (socialist) (1872–1949), British socialist activist
- Tommy Abbott (1934–1987), American actor, dancer and choreographer
- Tony Abbott (disambiguation)
- Ty Abbott (born 1988), American basketball player

== V ==
- Vince Abbott (born 1958), American football player
- Vincent Paul Abbott (1964–2018), birth name of American heavy-metal drummer and producer Vinnie Paul

== W ==
- Wallace Abbott (1857–1921), founder of Abbott Laboratories
- Walter Abbott (disambiguation)
- Wes Abbott (born 1971), American artist
- Wilbur Cortez Abbott (1869–1947), American historian and educator
- Wilhelmina Hay Abbott (1884–1957), Scottish suffragist and feminist
- William Abbot (actor) (1790–1843), English actor
- William Wright Abbot (1922–2009), American historian, educator, and writer
- William Abbott (disambiguation)
- Willis J. Abbot (1863–1934), American journalist and writer
- Wilson Ruffin Abbott (1801–1876), American-born Canadian businessman

== Fictional characters ==
- George Abbott (Coronation Street), on the soap opera Coronation Street
- Hannah Abbott, in the Harry Potter series of books
- Harold Abbott (Saw), in the film Saw VI
- Jack Abbott (The Young and the Restless), on the soap opera The Young and the Restless
- John Abbott (The Young and the Restless), on the soap opera The Young and the Restless
- Kyle Abbott (The Young and the Restless), on the soap opera The Young and the Restless
- Mickey Abbott, on the sitcom Seinfeld
- Richard Abbott (One Life to Live), on the soap opera One Life to Live

== See also ==
- Abbott (disambiguation)
- General Abbott (disambiguation)
- Justice Abbott (disambiguation)
- Senator Abbott (disambiguation)
- Abbot (surname)
