= Edwin Abbott =

Edwin Abbott or Abbot may refer to:

- Edwin Abbott (educator) (1808–1882), English educator
- Edwin Abbott Abbott (1838–1926), his son, English schoolmaster and theologian, author of Flatland
- Edwin Hale Abbot (1834–1927), American lawyer and railroad executive
- Edwin Milton Abbott (1877–1940), American lawyer and poet who served in the Pennsylvania House of Representatives
- Edwin Abbott (public servant) (1878–1947), Australian public servant
- Edwin Abbott (rugby league) (1909–1976), New Zealand international

== See also ==
- Edwin Hale Abbot (1834–1927), American lawyer and railroad executive
  - Edwin Abbot House, a historical house in Massachusetts
