= John Abbott (disambiguation) =

John Abbott (1821–1893) was prime minister of Canada, 1891–1892.

John Abbott or Abbot may also refer to:

== Arts and entertainment ==
- John Abbot (poet) (1587/8–c. 1650), English poet
- John White Abbott (1763–1851), English painter
- J. H. M. Abbott (John Henry Macartney Abbott, 1874–1953), Australian novelist and poet
- John Abbott (actor) (John Kefford, 1905–1996), British character actor
- John Abbott, a pen-name of author Evan Hunter (1926–2005)
- John Abbott (1937–2011), art dealer of Abbott and Holder

== Law and politics ==
- John Abbot (14th-century MP) (fl. 1379–1414), English politician, member of parliament for Melcombe Regis
- John Abbot (15th-century MP) (fl. 1423), his son, English politician, member of parliament for Weymouth
- John Farr Abbott (1756–1794), British barrister
- John T. Abbott (1850–1914), United States ambassador to Colombia
- John Beach Abbott (1854–1935), American judge and politician
- John Abbott (Newfoundland politician, born 1874) (1874–1947), Newfoundland politician
- John Abbott (Newfoundland and Labrador politician) (born 1956), Canadian politician

== Others ==
- John Abbot (entomologist) (1751–1840/1), American entomologist and ornithologist
- John Lovejoy Abbot (1783–1814), American cleric and librarian
- John Stevens Cabot Abbott (1805–1877), American author
- Tom Abbott (socialist) (John Thomas Abbott, 1872–1949), English socialist activist
- John Abbott (rugby league) (born 1953), Australian rugby league footballer

== Other uses ==
- John Abbott College, Sainte-Anne-de-Bellevue, Quebec, Canada
- John Abbott House, historic place in Abbottstown, Pennsylvania
- John Abbott (The Young and the Restless), fictional Soap opera character

== See also ==
- Jack Abbott (disambiguation)
