= William Abbott =

William, Bill or Billy Abbot/Abbott may refer to:

== Businessmen ==
- William Hawkins Abbott (1819–1901), American oil producer and trader
- William J. Abbott (born 1962), American businessman and CEO of Great American Media

== Performers ==
- William Abbot (actor) (1790–1843), English actor and theatrical impresario
- Bud Abbott (William Alexander Abbott, 1897–1974), American vaudeville and film actor, of Abbott and Costello

== Physicians ==
- William Louis Abbott (1860–1936), American physician and philanthropist
- William Osler Abbott (1902–1943), American physician noted as co-developer of Miller-Abbott tube

== Politicians ==
- William Abbot (politician) (fl. 1437), English politician
- William C. Abbott (c. 1817–1863), member of the Texas Senate
- William Abbott (Australian politician) (1844–1924), Australian political figure; represented electoral district of Upper Hunter 1889 to 1891
- William Abbott (Newfoundland politician) (1888–1974), Newfoundland merchant and politician

== Sportsmen ==
- William Abbott (cricketer) (1856–1935), English cricketer
- William Abbott (footballer) (fl. 1876–1893), English outside-left
- Bill Abbott Jr. (born 1954), Canadian Olympic sailor and boatbuilder

== Others ==
- William L. Abbott (1861–1951), American mechanical engineer
- Billy Abbott, a character on the American daytime soap opera The Young and the Restless
- William Wright Abbot (1922–2009), American archivist and historian

== See also ==
- William Abbotts (1736–1805), English landowner, co-founder of "Original Baths"
- Abbott (surname)
