= Richard Abbott =

Richard Abbott may refer to:

- Richard Abbott (architect) (1883–1954), New Zealand architect
- Richard Abbott (politician) (1859–1940), Australian politician
- Richard Abbott (One Life to Live), a character from the American soap opera One Life to Live

== See also ==
- Richard Abbot (1818–1904), English poet
