= General Abbott =

General Abbott may refer to:

- Frederick Abbott (Indian Army officer) (1805–1892), British Indian Army major general
- Frederick Vaughan Abbott (1858–1928), U.S. Army brigadier general
- Henry Larcom Abbot (1831–1927), Union Army brevet brigadier general
- Henry Livermore Abbott (1842–1864), Union Army posthumous brevet brigadier general
- Herbert Edward Stacy Abbott (1814–1883), British Indian Army major general
- James Abbott (Indian Army officer) (1807–1896), British Indian Army general
- Oscar Bergstrom Abbott (1890–1969), U.S. Army brigadier general
- Saunders Alexius Abbott (1811–1894), British Indian Army major general
- Woodrow A. Abbott (1919−1994), U.S. Air Force brigadier general

== See also ==
- Attorney General Abbott (disambiguation)
