= George Abbot =

George Abbot may refer to:

- George Abbot (bishop) (1562–1633), English clergyman who became Archbishop of Canterbury
- George Abbot (author) (c. 1603–1649), English writer and MP for Tamworth in the Short and Long parliaments
- George Abbotts (1602–1645), or Abbot, MP for Gilford in the Short and Long parliaments (nephew of the Archbishop George Abbot)

== See also ==
- George Abbot School, Burpham, Guildford, Surrey, England
- George Abbott (disambiguation)
- Abbot (surname)
