= Walter Abbott =

Walter Abbott may refer to:

- Walter Abbott (American football) (born c. 1936), American football player, coach, college athletics administrator, and university professor
- Walter Abbott (footballer, born 1877) (1877–1941), English footballer for Small Heath, Everton, Burnley and England
- Walter Abbott (footballer, born 1899) (1899 – after 1921), his son, English footballer for Grimsby Town
- Walter Sidney Abbott (1879–1942), American entomologist
- Walter P. Abbott (1887–1967), American newspaper owner and politician
