= Senator Bowman =

Senator Bowman may refer to:

- Bill Bowman (American politician) (born 1946), North Dakota State Senate
- Edwin Bowman (born 1946), West Virginia State Senate
- John Bowman (New York politician) (1782–1853), New York State Senate
- Jonathan Bowman (1828–1895), Wisconsin State Senate
- Peter Bowman (born 1937), Maine State Senate
- Selwyn Z. Bowman (1840–1928), Massachusetts State Senate
- Tod Bowman (born 1965), Iowa State Senate
- William C. Bowman (1882–1974), Mississippi State Senate
