= Harry Abbott =

Harry Abbott may refer to:

- Fred Abbott (Harry Frederick Abbott, 1874–1935), American baseball catcher
- Harry Abbott (footballer, born 1883) (1883–?), English footballer
- Harry Abbott (footballer, born 1895) (1895–1968), English goalkeeper

== See also ==
- Henry Abbott (disambiguation)
- Harold Abbott (disambiguation)
