= Frederick Abbott =

Frederick Abbott may refer to:

- Frederick Abbott (Indian Army officer) (1805–1892), English army officer
- Frederic Vaughan Abbot (1858–1928), American army officer and engineer
- Frederick M. Abbott (born 1952), American legal academic
- Frederick Abbott (cricketer) (1901–1952), New Zealand-born English cricketer
- Fred Abbott (1874–1935), American Major League Baseball catcher
- Fredric Abbott (1928–1996), Australian actor
