= Charles Abbot =

Charles Abbot may refer to:

- Charles Abbot, 1st Baron Colchester (1757–1829), British statesman
- Charles Abbot, 2nd Baron Colchester (1798–1867), British politician
- Charles Greeley Abbot (1872–1973), American astrophysicist and astronomer
- Charles Abbot (botanist) (1761–1817), British botanist and entomologist
- Charles S. Abbot (born 1945), American admiral
- Charles Wheaton Abbot Jr. (1860–1923), American military officer

== See also ==
- Charles Abbott (disambiguation)
- Abbot (surname)
