= Abbot Pass (Clackamas County, Oregon) =

Mountain pass in Oregon, United States

- Interactive map of Abbot Pass
- Elevation: 3,533 ft (1,077 m)

Third Approach
- Location: Clackamas County, Oregon, United States
- Range: Cascade Mountains
- Coordinates: 45°7′52″N 121°42′20″W

Abbot Pass is a 3,533 feet (1,077 m) high pass over the south side of Mount Hood, in Clackamas County, Oregon. U.S. Route 26 passes, over Abbot Pass.

Abbot Pass is named for Henry Larcom Abbot.

== In the area of Abbot Pass ==
The following cities are nearby:

- Government Camp 12.2 miles (19.6 km)
- Pine Grove 16.8 miles (27.0 km)

Timothy Lake and Warm Springs Highway are also nearby.
