= Attorney General Abbott =

Attorney General Abbott may refer to:

- Charles Abbott (Australian politician) (1889–1960), Attorney-General of South Australia
- Arthur Abbott (1892–1975), Attorney-General of Western Australia
- Greg Abbott (born 1957), Attorney General of Texas

== See also ==
- General Abbott (disambiguation)
