= Robert Abbott =

Robert Abbott or Abbot may refer to:

Ordered chronologically

- Robert Abbot (politician), 15th-century English politician
- Robert Abbot (bishop) (1560–1617), Bishop of Salisbury
- Robert Abbot (theologian) (c. 1588–c. 1662), English Puritan theologian
- Robert Abbott (Michigan politician) (1770–1852), American politician
- Robert Abbott (New South Wales politician) (1830–1901), Irish-born politician in New South Wales
- Robert Abbott, Baronet Hadfield (1858–1940), English metallurgist
- Robert Abbott (bishop) (1869–1927), Bishop of Sherborne
- Robert Sengstacke Abbott (1870–1940), African-American lawyer and publisher
- Robert Abbott (fl. 1930s–1960s), a founder of Abbott and Holder
- R. Tucker Abbott (1919–1995), American conchologist and malacologist
- Robert Abbott (game designer) (1933–2018), American game designer
- Robert Abbott (director) (born 1964), American film director and TV producer

== See also ==
- Robert S. Abbott House, former home of Robert Sengstacke Abbot
