= Building at 10 Follen Street =

Historic house in Massachusetts, United States

- U.S. National Register of Historic Places
- U.S. Historic district – Contributing property
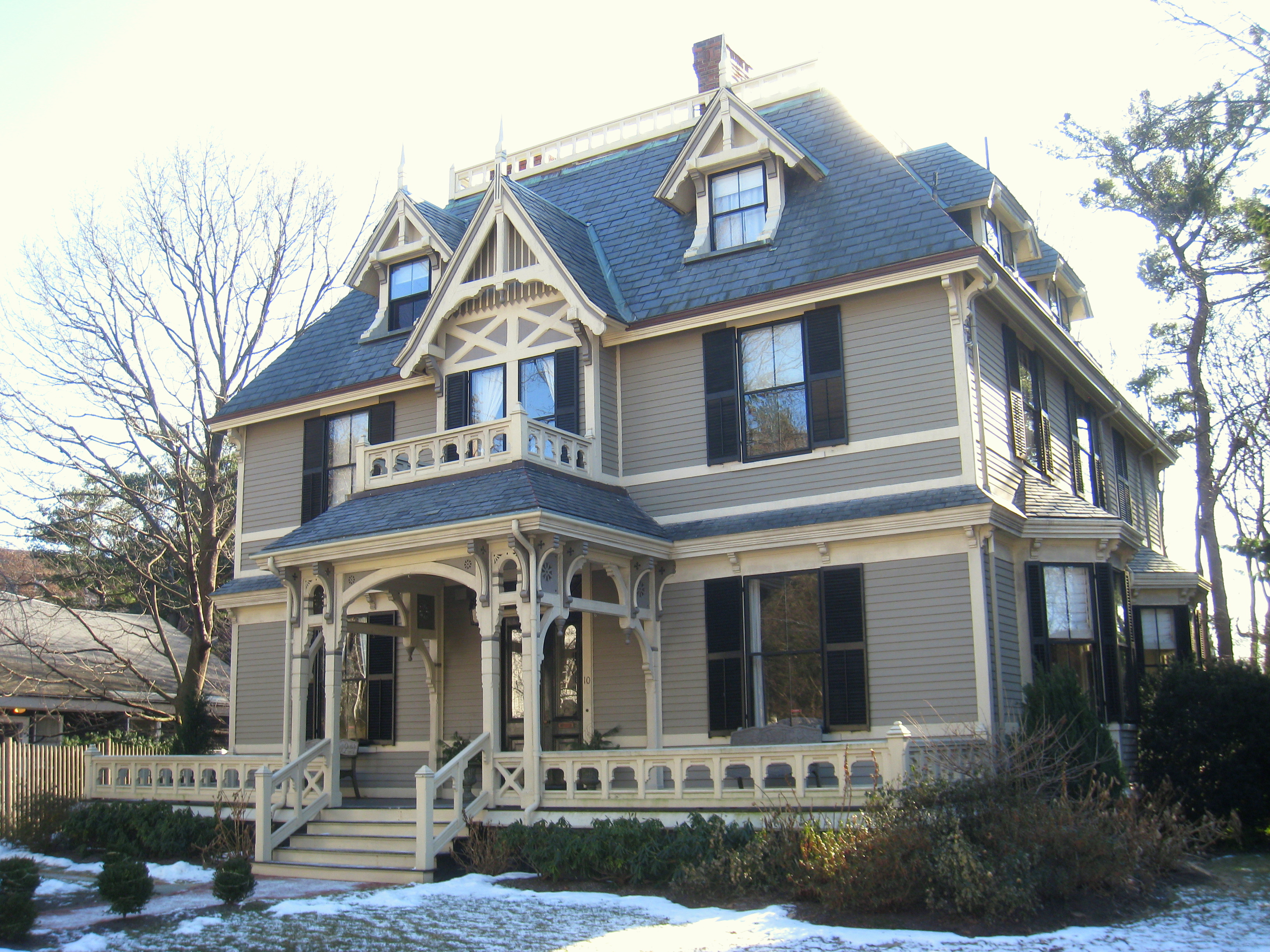

- Location within Massachusetts Location within the United States
- Location: Cambridge, Massachusetts
- Coordinates: 42°22′42.3″N 71°07′19.0″W
- Built: 1875
- Architect: Peabody & Stearns
- Architectural style: Stick/Eastlake
- Part of: Follen Street Historic District (ID86001681)
- MPS: Cambridge MRA
- NRHP reference No.: 82001926

Significant dates
- Added to NRHP: April 13, 1982
- Designated CP: May 19, 1986

The Building at 10 Follen Street is a historic house at 10 Follen Street in Cambridge, Massachusetts. The three-story wood-frame house was designed by Peabody & Stearns and built in 1875. It is a rare well-preserved example of the transition between Second Empire and Stick styles, with a truncated hip roof, a highly decorated porch, and most of its original interior woodwork.

The house was listed on the National Register of Historic Places in 1982, and was included in the Follen Street Historic District in 1986.

== See also ==
- National Register of Historic Places listings in Cambridge, Massachusetts
