= Judge Abbott =

Judge Abbott may refer to:

- Sir Charles Abbott (Australian politician) (1889–1960), judge of the Supreme Court of South Australia
- Henry Abbott (Irish judge) (born 1947), judge of the High Court of Ireland
- Howard Abbott (1867–1939), Minnesota state court judge
- Jo Abbott (1840–1908), judge if the twenty-eighth judicial district of Texas
- John Beach Abbott (1854–1935), country court judge of Livingston County, New York

== See also ==
- Justice Abbott (disambiguation)
