= Follen Street Historic District =

Historic district in Massachusetts, United States

- U.S. National Register of Historic Places
- U.S. Historic district
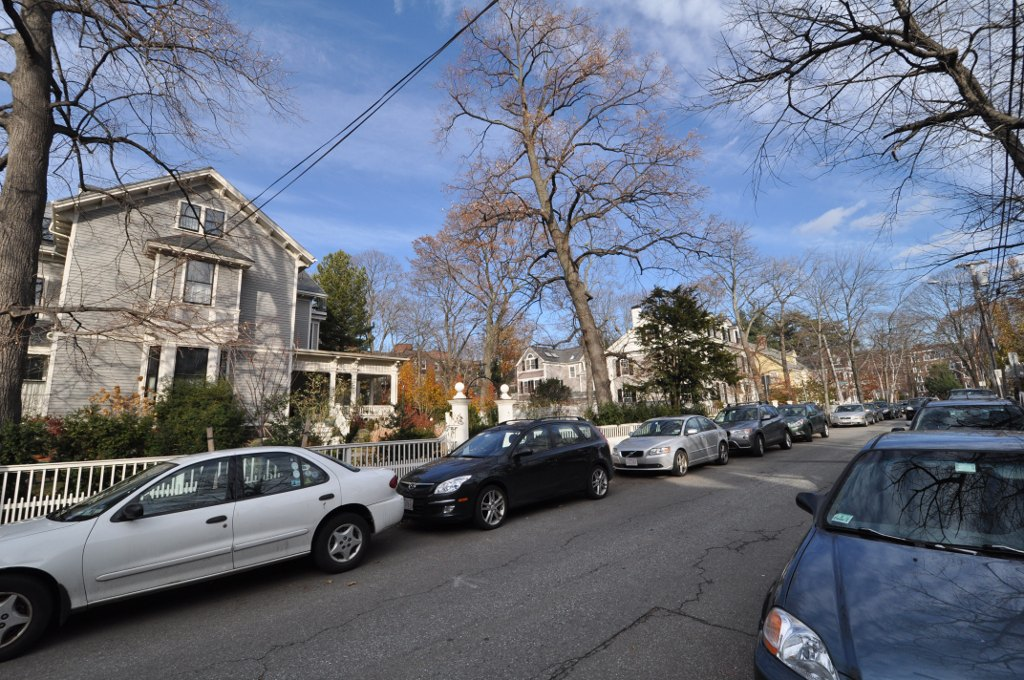
- North side of Follen Street

- Location within Massachusetts Location within the United States
- Location: Cambridge, Massachusetts
- Coordinates: 42°22′43″N 71°7′24″W
- Architect: Longfellow, Alden & Harlow; Et al.
- Architectural style: Late 19th And 20th Century Revivals, Greek Revival, Late Victorian
- MPS: Cambridge MRA
- NRHP reference No.: 86001681
- Added to NRHP: May 19, 1986

The Follen Street Historic District is a historic district in Cambridge, Massachusetts, just northwest of the Cambridge Common. Follen Street is a quiet residential street, isolated from through streets by large masonry buildings that front on Waterhouse Street and Garden Street. All but three of the houses on the street were built no later than 1900, and show a remarkable quality of workmanship, despite being diverse in their styles. A number of the houses are specifically associated with educators, including a number of Harvard University professors.

The Edwin Abbot House at 1 Follen Street is now the main building of the Longy School of Music of Bard College, and is separately listed on the National Register. Other houses listed separately include the Theodore W. Richards House at 15 Follen, the Second Waterhouse House at 9 Follen, and 10 Follen Street. The district was listed on the National Register of Historic Places in 1986.

== See also ==
- National Register of Historic Places listings in Cambridge, Massachusetts
