= Henry Abbott =

Henry Abbott or Abbot may refer to:

- Henry Abbot (martyr) (died 1597), English layman
- Henry Abbott (Irish judge) (born 1947), former judge of the Irish High Court, 2002–2017; former Irish Fianna Fáil politician and barrister
- Henry Larcom Abbot (1831–1927), American military engineer and civil war general
- Henry Livermore Abbott (1842–1864), American civil war soldier
- Henry William Charles Abbott (1807 or 1812–1859), for whom the Abbott Papyrus is named.
- Henry Abbott (merchant) (1834–1876), British merchant acting as consul for Germany in Tessaloniki, killed in the Salonika Incident

== See also ==
- Henry Abbott Technical High School, Danbury, Connecticut
- Harry Abbott (disambiguation)
