= Joseph Abbott =

Joseph Abbott may refer to:

- Joseph Abbott (Canadian priest) (1790–1862), Canadian, father of John Joseph Caldwell Abbott (3rd Prime Minister of Canada)
- Joseph Abbott (Irish priest) (died 1939), Dean of Leighlin
- Joseph Abbott (New South Wales politician, born 1843) (1843–1903), member for Newtown and Newtown-Camperdown
- Jo Abbott (1840–1908), Confederate army officer and U.S. politician from Texas
- Joseph Carter Abbott (1825–1881), U.S. Army general and U.S. Senator from North Carolina
- Joseph Florence Abbott (1888–1961), American lawyer
- Joseph Palmer Abbott (1842–1901), Australian politician and solicitor, member for Gunnedah and Wentworth
- Joe Abbott (Australian politician) (1891–1965), son of Joseph Palmer Abbott, member for New England and Minister for Home Security
- Joe Abbott (speedway rider) (1902–1950), British motorcyclist
- Joseph Henry Abbott (1830–1904), politician from Victoria, Australia, member of the Victorian Legislative Council
