= Harold Abbott =

Harold Abbott may refer to:

- Harold Abbott (rugby union) (1882–1971), New Zealand rugby union player
- Harold Abbott (artist) (1906–1986), Australian portrait painter, official war artist and art teacher
- H. H. Abbott, British poet Harold Henry Abbott (1891–1976)
- Harold Abbott (Saw), a fictional character

== See also ==
- Harry Abbott (disambiguation)
