= Second Waterhouse House =

Historic house in Massachusetts, United States

- U.S. National Register of Historic Places
- U.S. Historic district – Contributing property
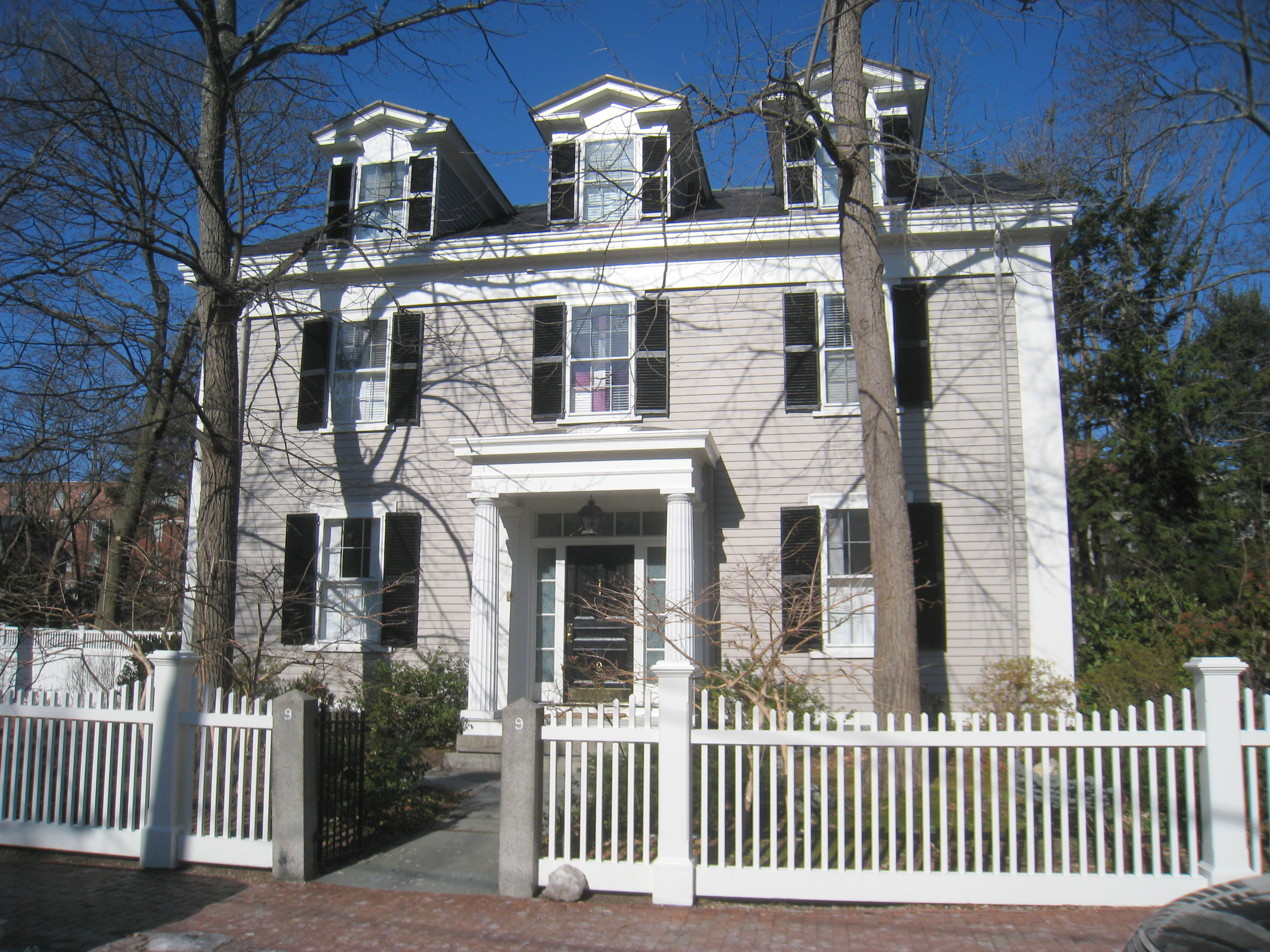

- Location within Massachusetts Location within the United States
- Location: Cambridge, Massachusetts
- Coordinates: 42°22′43.25″N 71°07′20.85″W
- Built: 1844
- Architectural style: Greek Revival
- Part of: Follen Street Historic District (ID86001681)
- MPS: Cambridge MRA
- NRHP reference No.: 83000827

Significant dates
- Added to NRHP: June 30, 1983
- Designated CP: May 19, 1986

The Second Waterhouse House is an historic house at 9 Follen Street in Cambridge, Massachusetts. The 2 1/2-story wood-frame house was built on 1844, and is the most quintessentially Greek Revival house in the Follen Street Historic District. It was built by Benjamin Waterhouse, and is one of the earliest houses built on the street. Of particular historical interest is the assortment of heating systems that have been installed in the house since 1853, remnants of some of which are still found in the house's basement.

The house was listed on the National Register of Historic Places in 1983.

== See also ==
- National Register of Historic Places listings in Cambridge, Massachusetts
