= Senator Abbott =

Senator Abbott may refer to:

- Ambrose Abbott (1813–1882), Maine State Senate
- Amos Abbott (1786–1868), Massachusetts State Senate
- Burroughs Abbott (1830–1905), South Dakota State Senate
- Chauncey M. Abbott (1822–1863), New York State Senate
- F. M. Abbott (1843–1908), Mississippi State Senate
- Frank Abbott (politician) (1828–1893), New York State Senate
- George E. Abbott (1858–1942), Wyoming State Senate
- Joseph Carter Abbott (1825–1881), United States Senator from North Carolina
- Josiah Gardner Abbott (1814–1891), Massachusetts State Senate
- Mac Abbott (1877–1960), Australian Senate
- Othman A. Abbott (1842–1935), Nebraska State Senate
- Richard Abbott (politician) (1859–1940), Australian Senate
- Walter P. Abbott (1887–1967), Mississippi State Senate

== See also ==
- Jack Abbott (The Young and the Restless), fictional member of the Wisconsin State Senate
- Leon Abbett (1837–1894), New Jersey State Senate
