= David Abbott =

David Abbott may refer to:

- Tank Abbott (born 1965), real name David Abbott, American heavyweight mixed martial artist
- David Abbott (priest) (1844–1917), Irish Anglican priest
- David Abbott (magician) (1863–1934), American magician and author of Behind the Scenes with the Mediums
- David Abbott (runner) (1902–1987), American Olympic athlete
- David Abbott (cricket umpire) (1934–2016), British-born New Zealand cricket umpire
- David Abbott (advertising) (1938–2014), British advertising executive and founder of Abbott Mead Vickers BBDO
- David Abbott (Indiana politician), member of the Indiana House of Representatives
