= Theodore W. Richards House =

Historic house in Massachusetts, United States

- U.S. National Register of Historic Places
- U.S. National Historic Landmark
- U.S. Historic district – Contributing property
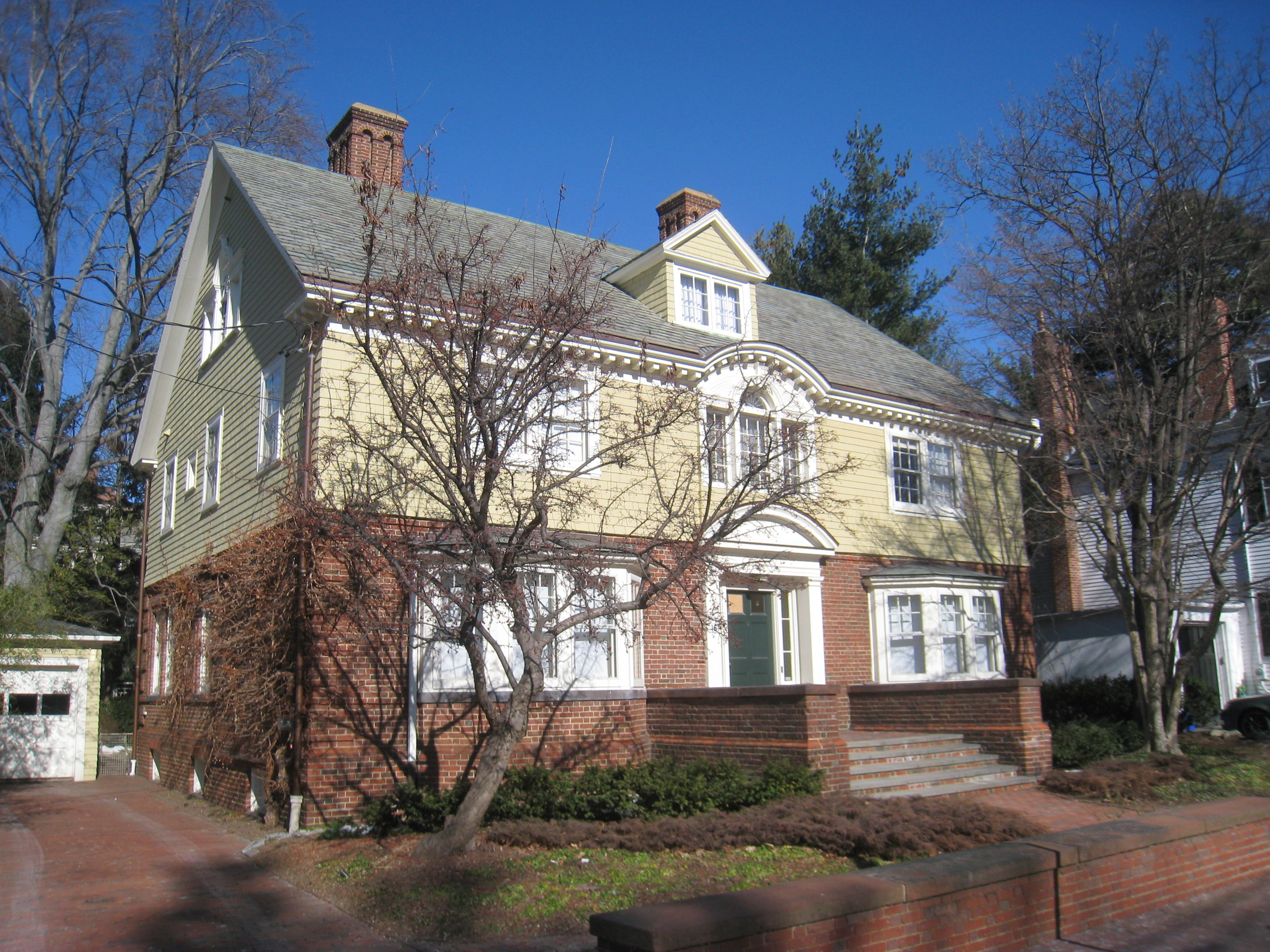

- Location within Massachusetts Location within the United States
- Location: Cambridge, Massachusetts
- Coordinates: 42°22′43.6″N 71°07′19.6″W
- Built: 1900
- Architect: Warren, Smith, & Biscoe
- Part of: Follen Street Historic District (ID86001681)
- NRHP reference No.: 76001999

Significant dates
- Added to NRHP: January 7, 1976
- Designated NHL: January 7, 1976
- Designated CP: May 19, 1986

The Theodore W. Richards House is a National Historic Landmark at 15 Follen Street in Cambridge, Massachusetts. Built in 1900, it was the home until his death of Theodore William Richards (1868–1928), the first American to be awarded the Nobel Prize in Chemistry. Richards was a leading experimental chemist of his day, measuring (as precisely as instruments of the day permitted) the atomic weights of a large number of elements. He was also responsible for the growth of Harvard University's graduate chemistry program to one of the finest in the nation. The house was designated a National Historic Landmark in 1976.

== Description and history ==
The Richards House was nominally designed by Warren, Smith & Biscoe of Boston, but Richards made specific demands in the design. It is a two-story structure, using steel beams as its principal supports, one of Richards' requests. The ground floor exterior walls consist of five courses of brick, with seaweed sandwiched between the courses in a bid to provide improved insulation to the structure. The second floor of the house is clad in shingles. The main facade is three bays wide, with a symmetrical appearance. The main entry is accessed by a walk lined with brick walls the join to the house walls. The entry, recessed into the brick wall, is flanked by sidelight windows. The outside of the recess is framed by pilasters and topped by an entablature and a segmented-arch pediment. Above the entrance is a Palladian window, which rises into an eyebrow gable on the modillioned roofline. The first-floor bays flanking the entry are both projecting polygonal bays with four sash windows, and there are paired sash windows above them on the second floor. Two decoratively corbelled chimneys pierce the roof. The house interior follows a typical central-hall plan.

Theodore Richards was born in Germantown, Pennsylvania in 1868, educated at home, and then at Haverford College and Harvard University, where he received his PhD in chemistry in 1888. From an early time he was interested in the question of atomic weights, a subject that he would study for most of his professional career. After his graduation he became an instructor at Harvard, eventually gaining promotion to full professor in 1901. He successfully recalculated the atomic weights of a number of chemical elements, developing methodology and apparatus along the way. Richards became the first American to receive the Nobel Prize in Chemistry in 1914, in recognition for this work. Richards' teaching was equally important, as he trained new generations of chemists in the practices and methods he used. Harvard established an honorary chemistry professorship in his name in 1925.

Richards' house, occupied by him until his death in 1928, and his widow until hers in 1941, was designated a National Historic Landmark and listed on the National Register of Historic Places in 1976. It is a contributing element to the Follen Street Historic District, listed in 1986.

== See also ==
- List of National Historic Landmarks in Massachusetts
- National Register of Historic Places listings in Cambridge, Massachusetts
