= Frank Abbott =

Frank Abbott may refer to:

- Frank Abbott (dentist) (1836–1897), American dentist
- Frank Abbott (politician) (1828–1893), New York politician
- Frank Abbott (footballer) (1885–1947), Australian rules footballer
- Frank Frost Abbott (1860–1924), American classical scholar

== See also ==
- Francis Abbott (1799–1883), Australian astronomer
- Francis Ellingwood Abbot (1836–1903), American philosopher and theologian
