= Anne Abbott =

Anna Wales Abott
- Born: April 10, 1808
- Died: June 1, 1908 (aged 100); Cambridge, Massachusetts
- Other names: Abbot
- Occupations: Game Designer, Magazine Editor

Anne Wales Abbott or, Abbot (April 10, 1808 – June 1, 1908) was a game designer, magazine editor, literary reviewer, and author.

== Life ==
Abbott was born on 10 April 1808, the daughter of Reverend Abiel Abbott, a Beverly, Massachusetts, clergyman, and Eunice Abbott.

Abbott designed the hugely popular card game Dr. Busby, which was published by W. & S. B. Ives of Salem, Massachusetts, on March 7, 1843. It sold 15,000 copies in its first eighteen months.

Abbott authored her second game The Game of the Races which was sold in Salem, Mass. through J. P. Jewett on January 13, 1844. The Game of the Races was not published by W. & S. B. Ives as it was not advertised with other published W. & S. B. Ives games in her book, DOCTOR BUSBY AND HIS NEIGHBORS which was typeset by November 24, 1844 but not released for sale until December 28, 1844.

She released her third game Master Rodbury, on September 14, 1844. This time she again used W. & S. B. Ives as the publisher.

Abbott published her first book, WILLIE ROGERS sometime before November 24, 1844, quickly followed by her second book, DOCTOR BUSBY AND HIS NEIGHBORS on December 28, 1844.

Before 1991 Anne Wales Abbott was credited for authoring The Mansion of Happiness board game which was released by W. & S. B. Ives on November 24, 1843 or 1832. The Mansion of Happiness was originally released in England in 1800, and authored by George W. M. Fox. She may have collaborated with S. B. (Stephen Bradshaw) Ives, but neither Anne nor Stephen, authored the W. & S. B. Ives published version which was an almost exact copy of the English game.

Before 1992 Abbott was credited for authoring the long-lasting card game, Authors which was published in 1861 by A. Augustus Smith of G. M. Whipple and A. A. Smith. Charles Trow in his book Prose and Verse, claims in his chapter on "Parlour Games", the game of Authors was invented by "a coterie of bright young ladies" of Salem and presented by A. Augustus Smith for publication.

Abbott died in Cambridge, Massachusetts, on 1 June 1908.
