= William C. Bowman =

American politician (1882–1974)

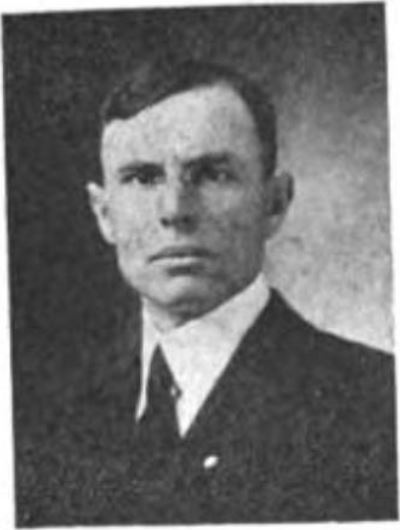
- c. 1917

Member of the Mississippi Senate from the 9th district
- In office January 1916 – January 1920
- Preceded by: W. C. Martin
- Succeeded by: Walter P. Abbott

Personal details
- Born: September 14, 1882 Ouachita Parish, LA
- Died: November 23, 1974 (aged 92) Montgomery, Alabama
- Party: Democrat

William Chapman Bowman (September 14, 1882 - November 23, 1974) was a Democratic Mississippi state senator, representing the state's 9th senatorial district, from 1916 to 1920.

== Biography ==
William Chapman Bowman was born on September 14, 1882, near Monroe, Ouachita Parish, Louisiana. He was the son of Francis Edwin Bowman and Pauline (Chapman) Bowman. Bowman attended the public schools of Runnels County, Texas, and Belton, Texas. His family moved to Natchez, Mississippi, in 1898, where Bowman attended the public schools there for 2 years. He attended Millsaps College from 1900 to 1904, and graduated in 1904 with a B. A. degree. He then attended the University of Mississippi to study law, graduating in 1905. He then started practicing law in Natchez. From 1916 to 1920, he represented Mississippi's 9th senatorial district as a Democrat in the Mississippi Senate. He died at 1:30 AM on November 23, 1974, in Montgomery, Alabama, where he had been living for 52 years.
