= Charles Abbott =

Charles Abbott may refer to:

- Charles Abbott, 1st Baron Tenterden (1762–1832), English jurist
- Charles Abbott, 3rd Baron Tenterden (1834–1882), British diplomat
- Charles Conrad Abbott (1843–1919), American archaeologist and naturalist
- Charles Lydiard Aubrey Abbott (1886–1975), Administrator of the Northern Territory of Australia
- Charles Abbott (footballer) (1939–2025), Australian rules footballer
- Charles Abbott (cricketer) (1815–1889), English lawyer and cricketer
- Sir Charles Abbott (Australian politician) (1889–1960), member of the South Australian House of Assembly, judge
- Charles Abbott (bowls) (1867–?), South African lawn bowls international

== See also ==
- Charles Abbot (disambiguation)
