= Paul Abbott (disambiguation) =

Paul Abbott (born 1960) is an English television scriptwriter.

Paul Abbott may also refer to:

- Paul Abbott (baseball) (born 1967), American professional baseball player
- Paul Abbott (footballer) (born 1964), Australian rules footballer
- Paul Abbott (basketball), American basketball coach

== See also ==
- Pawel Abbott (born 1982), footballer
