= John Abbot (poet) =

John Abbot (1587 or 1588 – c. 1650) was an English Roman Catholic clergyman and poet.

== Life ==
Abbot's birthplace is uncertain, but may have been London or Leicester. He is believed to be the nephew both of George Abbot, the Archbishop of Canterbury and Robert Abbot, the bishop of Salisbury. He was thus from a strongly Protestant family. After being educated at Balliol College, Oxford, he travelled to the continent where he converted to Roman Catholicism. On returning to England he was in Jesuit orders for a while, before working as a secular priest. In 1635 he was imprisoned in the Gatehouse at the Palace of Westminster. He was released within a year, but in 1637 he was again arrested, and seems to have spent the rest of his life in prison. He was, along with other Catholic priests, condemned to death in 1641, but the conviction was never executed, and he appears to have died in prison in 1650.

== Selected works ==
- Jesus Praefigured (1623)
- The Sad Condition of a Distracted Kingdome (1645)
- Devout Rhapsodies (2 vols., 1647)

Abbot's best known work is his poem Devout Rhapsodies (2 vols., 1647), about the war in heaven and the temptation and fall of man. The work can be seen as a precursor of Milton's Paradise Lost.
