= Tarnel Abbott =

American activist

Tarnel Abbott (born 1953) is a free speech advocate, activist, and librarian from Richmond, California. She is the great-granddaughter of Jack London. Abbott is also a prominent fixture in local politics and council meetings especially on conservation.

== Activism ==
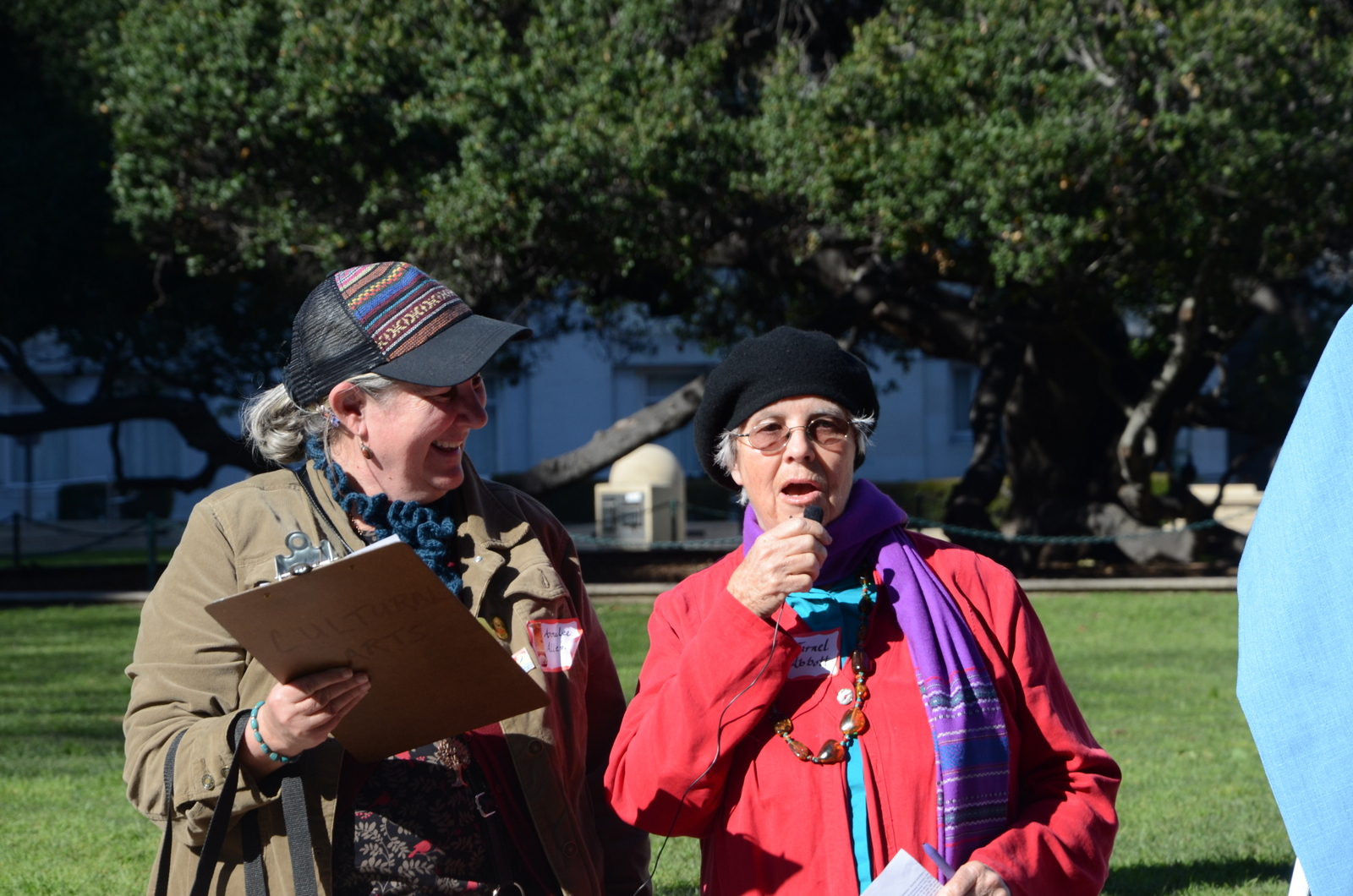
Abbott (right) at the Jack London Oak Tree (background) Dedication in January 2017 at Frank H. Ogawa Plaza

Tarnel Abbott is a social activist and the retired former reference librarian of the Richmond, California Library and has used her position to advocate for free speech. In 2006 the California Library Association awarded her the Zoia Horn Intellectual Freedom Award for her community activism, a collaborative film series with the ACLU, banned books displays. She was also applauded for lobbying for a counter PATRIOT Act resolution from the city council to prevent government snooping into library records. Abbott has also participated in delegations to Richmond's sister city of Regla, Cuba and received a display of over 100 paintings which display the history of that largely Afro-Cuban and similarly industrial and refinery-laden city. Abbott frequently protests with community groups at Chevron USA's corporate headquarters in nearby San Ramon. She is an opponent of casino developments and supports transforming the city into a green economy.

She serves as a councilmember of the Zeneca / Former Stauffer Chemical Company Community Advisory Group.

Tarnel Abbott is an accomplished artist, making various displays, paintings, and dioramas depicting everyday life in Richmond—particularly industrial pollution and the Tent Cities Movement, which have earned her praise.

Abbott has expressed opposition to the development of the former Point Molate Naval Fuel Depot.

== Family ==
Abbott's husband is palm tree farmer Robert Fowler. She is a fan and historian of her great-grandfather, although she does not embellish. She attended the University of California, Berkeley, as did her ancestor Jack London.
