= Abiel Abbot =

American clergyman (1770–1828)

- Born: August 17, 1770; Andover, Massachusetts
- Died: June 7, 1828 (aged 57) at sea
- Spouse: Eunice Wales (m. 1796; died 1828)
- Church: First Church Beverly Massachusetts
- Congregations served: First Church Beverly Massachusetts
- Offices held: Assistant teacher Phillips Academy, Exeter

Abiel Abbot (August 17, 1770 – June 7, 1828) was a prominent clergyman. He was born to John and Abigail Abbot in Andover, Massachusetts. In 1788 he went on to study at Harvard University. In 1792 he received the Bachelor of Arts degree with honors.

He was an assistant teacher at Phillips Academy, Exeter, New Hampshire, until August 1793. He started working as a preacher in Haverhill, Massachusetts, in 1794 and remained there through 1803, having been selected as pastor in 1795. He married Eunice Wales in 1796. He moved to Beverly, Massachusetts, in 1803, and became a pastor there of the First Church. He remained in that position through the end of his life.

In 1821, he received the degree of Doctor of Divinity from Harvard University.

To recover his health he passed the winter of 1827–1828 in and near Charleston, South Carolina, and embarked for Cuba in the spring of 1828. In Cuba he visited the cities, villages and plantations at Matanzas and Havana. He died of yellow fever on his way back from Charleston to New York. His remains were deposited in the cemetery on Staten Island, and the funeral service was performed by the Rev. Mr Miller.

He had one book published posthumously, Letters Written in the Interior of Cuba, in 1829.
