= Tony Abbott (disambiguation) =

Tony Abbott (born 1957) is the former prime minister of Australia.

Tony Abbott or Anthony Abbott may also refer to:

- Tony Abbott (Alberta politician) (born 1966), member of the legislature of Alberta, Canada
- Tony Abbott (author) (born 1952), American author of children's books
- Tony Abbott (diplomat) (born 1941), British diplomat and former Governor of Montserrat
- Tony Abbott (Ontario politician) (1930–2023), former federal Canadian cabinet minister
- Anthony S. Abbott (1935–2020), professor at Davidson College and writer

== See also ==
- Anthony Abbot (1893–1952), pseudonym of Fulton Oursler, American fiction author.
- Anthony the Great also known as Saint Anthony Abbot.
