= Edward Abbott =

Edward Abbott may refer to:

- Edward Abbott (governor) (fl. 1775–1778), rebuilt Fort Vincennes, Indiana
- Edward Abbott (jurist) (1766–1832), Australian soldier, politician and judge
- Edward Gilbert Abbott (1825–1855), American patient upon whom ether was demonstrated
- Edward Abbott (priest) (1841–1908), American Christian minister
- Edward Lyman Abbott (1891–1918), Canadian athlete after whom the Abbott Cup is named
- Edward Abbott (Master of Magdalene College) (died 1746)
