= Justice Abbott =

Justice Abbott may refer to:

- Bob Abbott (1932–2010), justice of the Kansas Supreme Court
- Charles Abbott, 1st Baron Tenterden (1762–1832), Lord Chief Justice of the King's Bench of England
- Greg Abbott (born 1957), justice of the Texas Supreme Court

== See also ==
- Judge Abbott (disambiguation)
