= Dennis Abbott =

American politician (born 1941)

Member of the New Hampshire House of Representatives from the Rockingham 19th district
- In office 1994–2000

Member of the New Hampshire House of Representatives from the Rockingham 12th district
- In office 2004–2010

Personal details
- Born: April 12, 1941 (age 85) Exeter, New Hampshire, U.S.
- Party: Democratic
- Spouse: Evelyn
- Profession: Technical writer

Dennis F. Abbott (born 1941) is a former Democratic member of the New Hampshire House of Representatives. He represented the Rockingham 12th District since a special election in 2004. He had previously served from 1994 through 2000.
