= Mary Abbott =

Mary Abbott may refer to:

- Mary Abbott (artist) (1921–2019), American painter
- Mary Abbott (golfer) (1857–1904), American golfer and novelist
- Mary Bethune Abbott (1823–1898), wife of Sir John Abbott, the third Prime Minister of Canada
- Mary Ogden Abbott (1894–1981), American artist, traveler and equestrian
