= Walter Sidney Abbott =

American entomologist

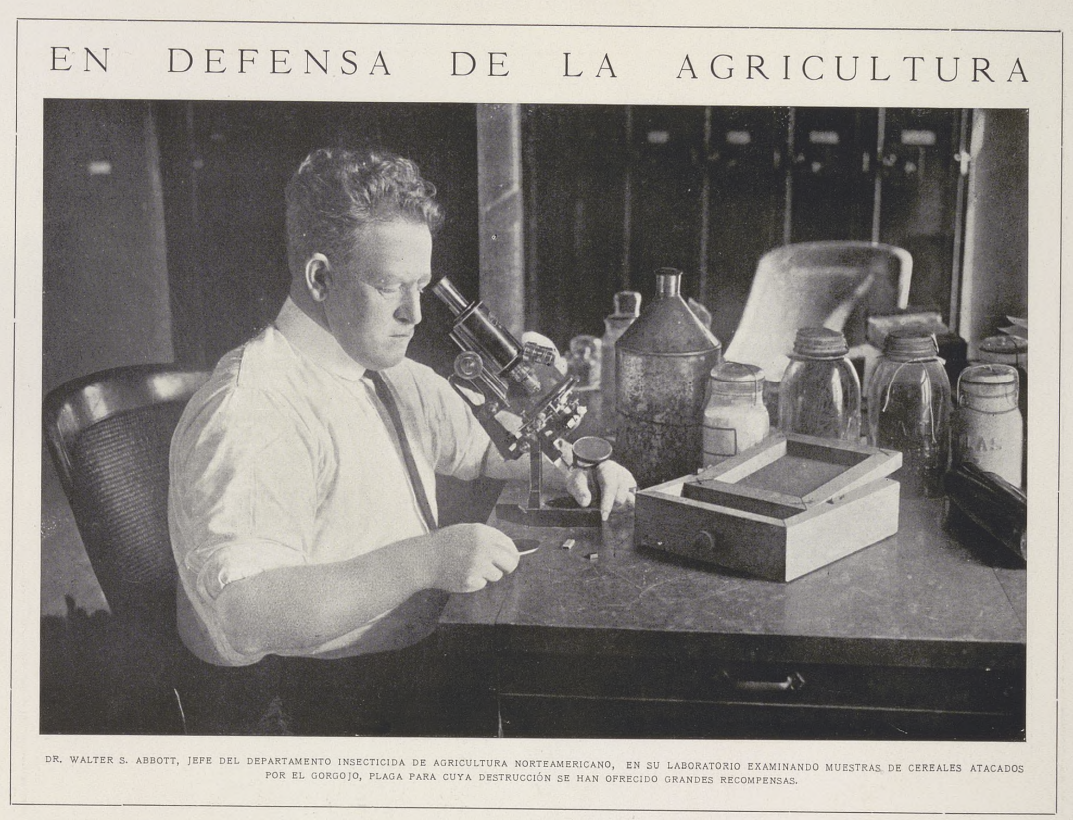
Walter S. Abbott in the Argentine magazine Plus Ultra, September 1923.

Walter Sidney Abbott (May 21, 1879 – October 27, 1942) was an American entomologist who worked at the Bureau of Entomology in Virginia and is best known for Abbott's Formula to calculate insecticide efficiency with a correction involving natural deaths.

Abbott was born in Manchester, New Hampshire, and graduated from the University of New Hampshire in 1910, following which he worked at the New Jersey Agricultural Experiment Station. He joined the Bureau of Entomology in 1912 with the job of enforcing the Insecticide Act of 1910. He worked until his retirement in 1938. He was involved in founding the Insecticide Society of Washington in 1934 and the Manchester Institute of Arts and Sciences. His most significant contribution was the so-called Abbott's Formula that he published in 1925 to calculate the efficiency of insecticides, which subtracts the natural deaths of insects using results from a control plot.

Abbott's correction in its basic form is:

$$\text{mortality}\%=\left(1 - \frac {P_t} {P_c}\right)*100$$

where P_{c} is the proportion (or numbers) of individuals alive in the control; P_{t} is the proportion (or numbers) of individuals alive in the treatment (both of which start initially with the same numbers or densities of test organisms).

He married Lilla Robinson in 1911, and they had a daughter and a son who survived him.
