= Ira Abbott =

American aerospace engineer (1906–1988)

Ira H. Abbott
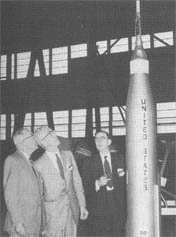
- Ira H. Abbott, at the right
- Born: Ira Herbert Abbott; July 18, 1906; United States of America
- Died: November 3, 1988 (aged 82)
- Education: Massachusetts Institute of Technology
- Scientific career
- Fields: aerospace engineering
- Institutions: NACA, NASA

Ira H. Abbott (July 18, 1906 – November 3, 1988) was an American aerospace engineer. After graduating from MIT, Abbott started working for Langley Aeronautical Laboratory in 1929. He contributed significantly to the establishment of high-speed research programs and published numerous technical reports on aerodynamics. He eventually attained the post of assistant chief of research at Langley in 1945.

In 1948, he moved to National Advisory Committee for Aeronautics (NACA) Headquarters to work as the assistant director of research (aerodynamics), and in 1959 and 1961 he was elevated to the positions of director of advanced research programs in NASA and director of advanced research and technology. He was the Director of Aeronautical and Space Research at NASA between 1959 and 1962. As Assistant Director of NACA, Abbott was decisive in keeping Ames Research Center focused on research instead of moving into operations during the development of the proposed Orbiting Astronomical Observatory in 1960.

Abbott supervised the X-15, supersonic transport, nuclear rocket and advanced reentry programs. He retired in 1962.

In recognition for his "outstanding contributions" to airfoil research and his leadership, he was inducted into the first round of the NACA/NASA Hall of Fame on August 13, 2015.

== Bibliography ==
- Abbott co-authored the reference book Theory of Wing Sections, including a summary of airfoil data, with Albert E. von Doenhoff in 1949.
