= John Abbott (rugby league) =

Australian rugby league footballer

Personal information
- Born: 15 February 1953 (age 73) Innisfail, Queensland, Australia

Playing information
- Position: Second-row
Club
Years	Team	Pld	T	G	FG	P
1973–7?	Fortitude Valley
1979	Canterbury-Bankstown	10	0	0	0	0
1980	Eastern Suburbs	15	4	0	0	12
	Total	25	4	0	0	12

Coaching information
Club
Years	Team	Gms	W	D	L	W%
1980	Eastern Suburbs	21	6	0	15	29

John Abbott (born 15 February 1953 in Innisfail, Queensland) is an Australian former professional rugby league footballer who played in the 1970s. He played in the New South Wales Rugby Football League premiership for the Canterbury-Bankstown club and in the Brisbane Rugby League premiership for the Eastern Suburbs club, winning grand finals with them in 1977 and 1978. He played predominantly as a second row forward.
