= Jack Abbott =

Jack Abbott may refer to:

- Jack Henry Abbott (1944–2002), American criminal and author
- Jack Abbott (coach) (1873–1918), American college football and baseball coach
- Jack Abbott (footballer) (1943–2002), English footballer
- Jack Abbott (politician) (born 1990), English politician
- Jack Abbott (The Young and the Restless), a character in a CBS soap opera
- Dr. Jack Abbot, a character in the HBO medical drama The Pitt

== See also ==
- John Abbott (disambiguation)
