= David Abbott (priest) =

Irish Anglican priest

David Charles Abbott (14 August 1844 – 22 April 1917) was an Irish Anglican priest in the late nineteenth and early twentieth centuries: He was Archdeacon of Clogher from 1906 to 1917.

Abbott was born in Anaghadoe, County Monaghan, to John and Mary Abbott. He was educated at Trinity College, Dublin, and ordained in 1869. He served curacies at Carlingford, Mullaghdun, and Sandymount. He was the incumbent at Fivemiletown from 1874 until 1886; and Tydavnet from 1886 to his death in April 1917. After five decades as a priest, Abbott died at Tydavnet Rectory, aged 87.

In 1870, he married Louisa Mills, daughter of John Wills, mayor of Tiverton, Devon. She died in 1875 after giving birth to their fourth child. In 1879, he married again to Charlotte Elizabeth Church, with whom he had six children.

His son by his second wife, Vivian Hartley Church Abbott, a surveyor in British Columbia who served with the Canadian Corps, was killed on the Western Front a few months after Rev. Abbott's death. Vivian was injured at the Battle of Hill 70 and evacuated, only to be shelled the next day while en route to the field hospital. Another son, Herbert Henry Bloxham Abbott, also served with the Canadian army and was awarded the Military Cross in 1917.
