= Edwin Milton Abbott =

American politician

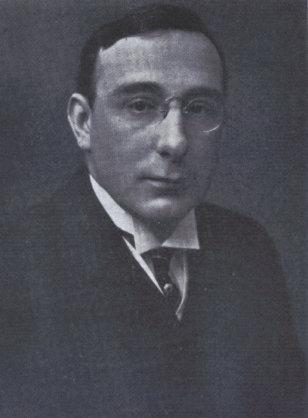
Abbott in 1919

Edwin Milton Abbott (June 4, 1877 – November 8, 1940) was an American lawyer and poet, born in Philadelphia and educated at Central High School and received a LLB at the University of Pennsylvania. He was admitted to the bar in 1896 and subsequently distinguished himself in criminal cases. He was chief counsel in the fight of the Philadelphia commuters against the railroads, a member of the Pennsylvania House of Representatives, 1911–12, chairman of the Commission on the Revision of Criminal Laws in the State of Pennsylvania, 1912–15 and 1917–23, and in 1913 minority nominee for judge of the Court of Common Pleas. He was appointed as secretary of the American Institute of Criminal Law and Criminology in 1913.

Abbott was the author of Thoughts in Verse (1922) and The Law and Religion (1938).
