= Patricia Kathleen Abbott =

Australian veterinarian and veterinary pathologist (1913–1998)

- in March 1937, after the announcement of her engagement
- Born: Patricia Kathleen Littlejohn; 23 June 1913; Sydney, New South Wales, Australia
- Died: 13 September 1998 (aged 85); Sydney, New South Wales, Australia
- Education: University of Sydney
- Known for: 1st woman to graduate in veterinary science, University of Sydney
- Scientific career
- Fields: Veterinary pathology
- Workplaces: University of Sydney

Patricia Kathleen Abbott (née Littlejohn) (23 June 1913 – 13 September 1998) was an Australian veterinarian and veterinary pathologist. She was the first woman to graduate from the University of Sydney with a degree in veterinary science.

== Early life and education ==
Patricia Kathleen Littlejohn was born in Sydney on 23 June 1913. She was the second daughter of Linda (née Teece) and Albert Littlejohn. She grew up at The Knoll in St Mark's Road, Edgecliff, next door to Ascham School, where she completed her secondary education. Her mother had also attended Ascham and was a member of the Feminist Club. Her father sold The Knoll to Ascham in 1929 for use as a boarding house from 1931.

She was one of the first two women to enrol in veterinary science at the University of Sydney. Her fellow student, Ann Flashman, however, repeated a year so Abbott was the first woman graduate when she completed her degree in 1934. During her studies she lived on campus at the Women's College. In 1933, Abbott was elected president of the Women's Undergraduates Association.

== Career ==
On graduation, Abbott was employed by the University of Sydney where she worked as a demonstrator (1935–1937). Her veterinary career was paused in December 1937 when she married fellow student Terence Kingsmill Abbott, younger son of Senator and Mrs Macartney Abbott.

Based in Papua New Guinea with her husband, Abbott worked as a veterinary officer (1956–1959) and then veterinary pathologist (1961–1965) in the Department of Agriculture, Stock and Fisheries. From 1966 to 1973 in England, she was a pathologist with Glaxo Laboratories.

Abbott died in Sydney on 13 September 1998.
