= Alan Abbott =

English cricketer (1926–2008)

Personal information
- Born: 15 November 1926; Sutton-in-the-Elms, England
- Died: 28 November 2008 (aged 82)
- Batting: Right-handed
- Bowling: Right-arm off break

Career statistics
Competition	First-class
Matches	1
Runs scored	5
Batting average	2.50
100s/50s	0/0
Top score	5
Balls bowled	18
Wickets	0
Bowling average	–
5 wickets in innings	–
10 wickets in match	–
Best bowling	–
Catches/stumpings	0/–
- Source: CricketArchive, 6 December 2022

Alan Wesley Abbott (15 November 1926 – 28 November 2008) was an English first-class cricketer. He was born in Sutton-in-the-Elms, Leicestershire. He came to limited attention with some useful performances for the County XI during the makeshift fixture list of 1945, scoring 83 against the RAF Regiment. He played one first-class match for Leicestershire in 1946, failing to distinguish himself with either bat or ball in an eight wicket defeat against Kent at the Nevill Ground, Tunbridge Wells.
