= Dorian Abbot =

American geophysicist

- Born: Dorian Schuyler Abbot
- Education: Harvard University (BA, MS, PhD)
- Scientific career
- Fields: Geophysics
- Institutions: University of Chicago
- Thesis: A high-latitude convective cloud feedback (2008)
- Doctoral advisor: Eli Tziperman

Dorian Schuyler Abbot is an American geophysicist. He is a professor at the University of Chicago.

== Education ==
Abbot was educated at Harvard University, where he earned a Bachelor of Arts in 2004 in physics, then received a Master of Science (2004) and Ph.D. (2008) in applied mathematics from the Harvard John A. Paulson School of Engineering and Applied Sciences. His dissertation was titled A high-latitude convective cloud feedback. Abbot's doctoral advisor was Eli Tziperman. From 2008 to 2009, he was a postdoctoral researcher in the Department of Earth and Planetary Sciences at Harvard University. Abbot conducted post doctoral research in geophysical sciences from 2009 to 2011 at the University of Chicago.

== Career ==
Abbot became an assistant professor of geophysical sciences at University of Chicago in 2011. He became an associate professor in 2015 and a full professor in 2024. Abbot uses low-order mathematical models and numerical models to research climates, paleoclimates, planetary habitability, and exoplanets.

=== MIT lecture cancellation ===
In 2020, the Massachusetts Institute of Technology invited Abbot to discuss his work on extraterrestrial life in the public Carlson Lecture. The COVID-19 pandemic postponed the lecture to the following year. In September 2021, the host department cancelled Abbot's public lecture and offered Abbot a future private lecture to its faculty and students. According to the department, the cancellation responded to objections from faculty and students to a Newsweek editorial co-written by Abbot in the prior month.

In the editorial, Abbot and Stanford professor Ivan Marinovic argued for renewed focus on individual talent in university admissions and hiring. They called for abolishing "group membership" preferences, including race and legacy preference in university admissions, and criticized aspects of university diversity policy. They recalled how the racial ideology of Nazi Germany "drove many of the best scholars out" of the universities, and called this "a warning of the consequences of viewing group membership as more important than merit."

Defending the lecture cancellation, senior MIT officials stated that controversy over Abbott's views on diversity would "overshadow" the scientific content of his public lecture. Abbot ultimately delivered his lecture on planetary science to a larger audience hosted by the James Madison Program in American Ideals and Institutions at Princeton University on the same day as the cancelled event. Abbot was a guest on Tucker Carlson Tonight and CNN to discuss the cancellation. He also received a Hero of Intellectual Freedom Award from the American Council of Trustees and Alumni.

Following public outrage and rebukes from MIT faculty about free expression, the university held forums at which attending faculty were polled on free speech questions. 60% of attendees felt that their voices were "constrained" at MIT; a new MIT Free Speech Alliance cited these findings as a call to action. In December 2022, responding to the Abbot controversy, MIT's faculty voted by a roughly 2-to-1 margin to adopt a formal university statement on freedom of expression. Abbot said of the faculty statement: "The challenge is always enforcement, but it looks promising."

== Publications ==
Abbot's most cited publications are:

- Hoffman PF, Abbot DS, Ashkenazy Y, Benn DI, Brocks JJ, Cohen PA, Cox GM, Creveling JR, Donnadieu Y, Erwin DH, Fairchild IJ. Snowball Earth climate dynamics and Cryogenian geology-geobiology. Science Advances. 2017 Nov 1;3(11):e1600983. open access. According to Google Scholar, cited 248 times
- Palmer PI, Abbot DS, Fu TM, Jacob DJ, Chance K, Kurosu TP, Guenther A, Wiedinmyer C, Stanton JC, Pilling MJ, Pressley SN. Quantifying the seasonal and interannual variability of North American isoprene emissions using satellite observations of the formaldehyde column. Journal of Geophysical Research: Atmospheres. 2006 Jun 27;111(D12). open access. According to Google Scholar, cited 245 times
- Yang J, Cowan NB, Abbot DS. Stabilizing cloud feedback dramatically expands the habitable zone of tidally locked planets. The Astrophysical Journal Letters. 2013 Jun 27;771(2):L45. According to Google Scholar, cited 225 times
- Abbot DS, Voigt A, Koll D. The Jormungand global climate state and implications for Neoproterozoic glaciations. Journal of Geophysical Research: Atmospheres. 2011 Sep 27;116(D18). open access. According to Google Scholar, cited 245 times
- Yang J, Boué G, Fabrycky DC, Abbot DS. Strong dependence of the inner edge of the habitable zone on planetary rotation rate. The Astrophysical Journal Letters. 2014 Apr 25;787(1):L2. According to Google Scholar, cited 136 times
- Abbot DS, Cowan NB, Ciesla FJ. Indication of insensitivity of planetary weathering behavior and habitable zone to surface land fraction. The Astrophysical Journal. 2012 Aug 24;756(2):178.
