= Joseph Florence Abbott =

American lawyer

- Born: March 3, 1888; Clarksville, Tennessee
- Died: November 17, 1961 (aged 73)
- Occupation(s): soldier, lawyer, businessperson
- Known for: President of the American Sugar Refining Company from 1929 to 1953

Joseph Florence Abbott (March 3, 1888 – November 17, 1961) was a lawyer, who served as President of the American Sugar Refining Company, then the largest sugar producer in the United States. During World War I, he served as a lieutenant in the United States Army.

== Early life and education ==
Abbott was born on March 3, 1888, in Clarksville, Tennessee, to Florence and Elizabeth Abbott. He graduated from St. Mary's College and then studied law at Georgetown University from 1907 to 1911.

== Career ==
Abbott was admitted to the bar in the District of Columbia in 1912.

During World War I, he served as a lieutenant in the field artillery in the United States Army.

After serving in the military during World War I, he returned to practice law. He served as the General Counsel for the American Sugar Refining Company from 1926 to 1929. He became its President in 1929 and served as such until 1953.

== Personal life ==
Abbott married Laura C. Griswold on June 5, 1920. Together, they had 2 children: Charles Griswold Abbott and Joseph Alan Abbott.

== Death and legacy ==
Abbott died on November 17, 1961, and was buried in Putnam Cemetery, Greenwich, Connecticut.
