= George Abbott (disambiguation) =

George Abbott (1887–1995) was an American playwright and director.

George Abbott may also refer to:

== People ==
Listed chronologically by birth year

- George Abbott (1857–1893), birth name of Frank Almy; American convicted murderer executed by the state of New Hampshire
- George E. Abbott (1858–1942), American politician in the Wyoming Senate
- George Henry Abbott (1867–1942), Australian physician
- George Frederick Abbott (1874–1947), English war correspondent and author
- George P. Abbott (1880–1923), British Royal Navy officer and member of the ill-fated Terra Nova Expedition, 1910–13
- George Abbott (GC) (1897–1977), British sailor and George Cross recipient
- George Abbott (ice hockey) (1911–1996), Canadian ice hockey goaltender
- George Abbott (politician) (born 1952), Canadian politician
- George Abbott (footballer, born August 2005), English footballer for Tottenham Hotspur

== Fictional character ==
- George Abbott (Coronation Street), Coronation Street soap opera character

== See also ==
- George Abbott Theater, currently the Adelphi Theatre, New York
- George Abbot (disambiguation)
