= Samuel Warren Abbott =

American surgeon

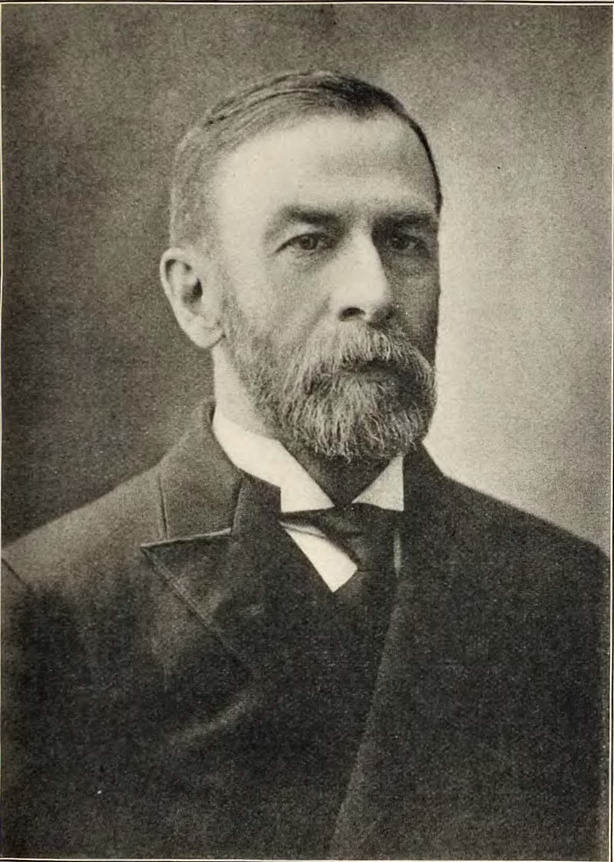
- Born: 12 June 1837; Woburn
- Died: 22 October 1904; Newton
- Education: Harvard Medical School, Brown University
- Occupations: Medical examiner, coroner (1872–1877), surgeon (1861–1865), medical examiner (1877–1884)

Samuel Warren Abbott (June 12, 1837 – October 22, 1904) was an American surgeon with an interest in hygiene, born in Woburn, Massachusetts. In 1877, he helped inaugurate the first medical examiner system in Massachusetts. He was the first secretary of Massachusetts' first state board of health, serving from 1886 to 1904.

He was born to army captain Samuel Abbott and Ruth Winn. He attended Phillips Andover Academy, and graduated with a bachelor of arts in 1858, and a Master of Arts degree from Brown University in 1861. He attended Harvard Medical School, graduating in 1862.

Abbott died at his home in Newton, Massachusetts in 1904.
