= William Abbott (footballer) =

English footballer

Personal information
- Full name: William Abbott
- Place of birth: Yorkshire, England
- Position: Outside left

Senior career*
Years	Team	Apps	(Gls)
- Riddings
1893	Derby County	4	(1)
- Poolsbrook United
- Riddings
- Chesterfield Town
- Riddings
- Clowne Rovers
- Walgrave
- Market Harborough
- * Club domestic league appearances and goals

William Abbott was a footballer who played in the Football League for Derby County.
