= Steve Abbott =

Steve Abbott may refer to:

- Steve Abbott (comedian) (born 1956), Australian comedian and author
- Steve Abbott (film producer) (born 1954), British film producer
- Steve Abbott (musician) (born 1960), British artist manager, promoter, and consultant
- Steve Abbott (politician) (born 1962), American politician
