= James Abbott =

James or Jim Abbott may refer to:

- James Abbott (Indian Army officer) (1807–1896), British colonial administrator
- James H. Abbott (1851–1914), British philatelist
- Jim Abbott (outfielder) (1884–1926), American baseball player
- James Abbott (footballer) (1892–?), English footballer
- Jim Abbott (Canadian politician) (1942–2020), Canadian politician
- James W. Abbott (born 1948), American university administrator and politician
- Jim Abbott (born 1967), American baseball player
- James T. Abbott, American attorney and government official
