= Clara Abbott =

American business executive

- Born: Clara Augusta Ingraham; December 14, 1857; Pomfret, Vermont, U.S.
- Died: January 2, 1924 (aged 66); Chicago, Illinois, U.S.
- Other names: Clara Augusta Ingraham
- Occupation: Corporate Director
- Known for: First woman in the U.S. to be a corporate director
- Notable work: Clara Abbott Foundation

Clara Abbott (1857–1924) was an American business executive. She was the first woman who served as a corporate director in America. She served on the board of Abbott Laboratories from 1900 to 1908 and from 1911 to 1924 before the company was publicly listed. She was married to the company's founder, Wallace Abbott.

She died on January 2, 1924, in Chicago. In her will, she left 12,000 shares of Abbott Laboratories stock to be used "in furtherance of my beloved husband’s profession and work". Her will included a provision to establish a charity for Abbott employees.
