= Tommy Abbott =

American actor, dancer, and choreographer

- Born: Tom Shaw Abbott; November 4, 1934; Waco, Texas, U.S.
- Died: April 8, 1987 (aged 52); New York
- Occupations: Actor, dancer, choreographer
- Years active: 1957–1981
- Partner: Jerome Robbins

Tommy Abbott (born Tom Shaw Abbott; November 4, 1934 – April 8, 1987) was an American actor, dancer, and choreographer who portrayed Gee-Tar in the original production of West Side Story. Abbott was for many years the assistant choreographer to Jerome Robbins. He was the chief choreographer for the film version of Fiddler on the Roof.

== Early life and career ==
Born in Waco, Texas to R.T. Abbott and Genevieve Shaw, Abbott first studied dance with a local teacher, Elmer Wheatley. After graduating from high school, he moved to New York, where he attended the School of American Ballet.

== Death ==
Abbott died in New York City on April 8, 1987, at the age of 52.

== Credits ==
=== Choreography ===
- Fiddler on the Roof (1981)
- West Side Story (1980)
- Fiddler on the Roof (1976)
- Fiddler on the Roof (1964) Assistant to Choreographer
- West Side Story (1964)

=== Stage management ===
- Tovarich (1963) Assistant to Stage Manager

=== Performer ===
- Fiddler on the Roof (1964) "Vladimir"
- A Family Affair (1962) Dancer
- West Side Story (1957) "Gee-Tar"
