= Edwin Abbot House =

Historic house in Massachusetts, United States

- U.S. National Register of Historic Places
- U.S. Historic district – Contributing property
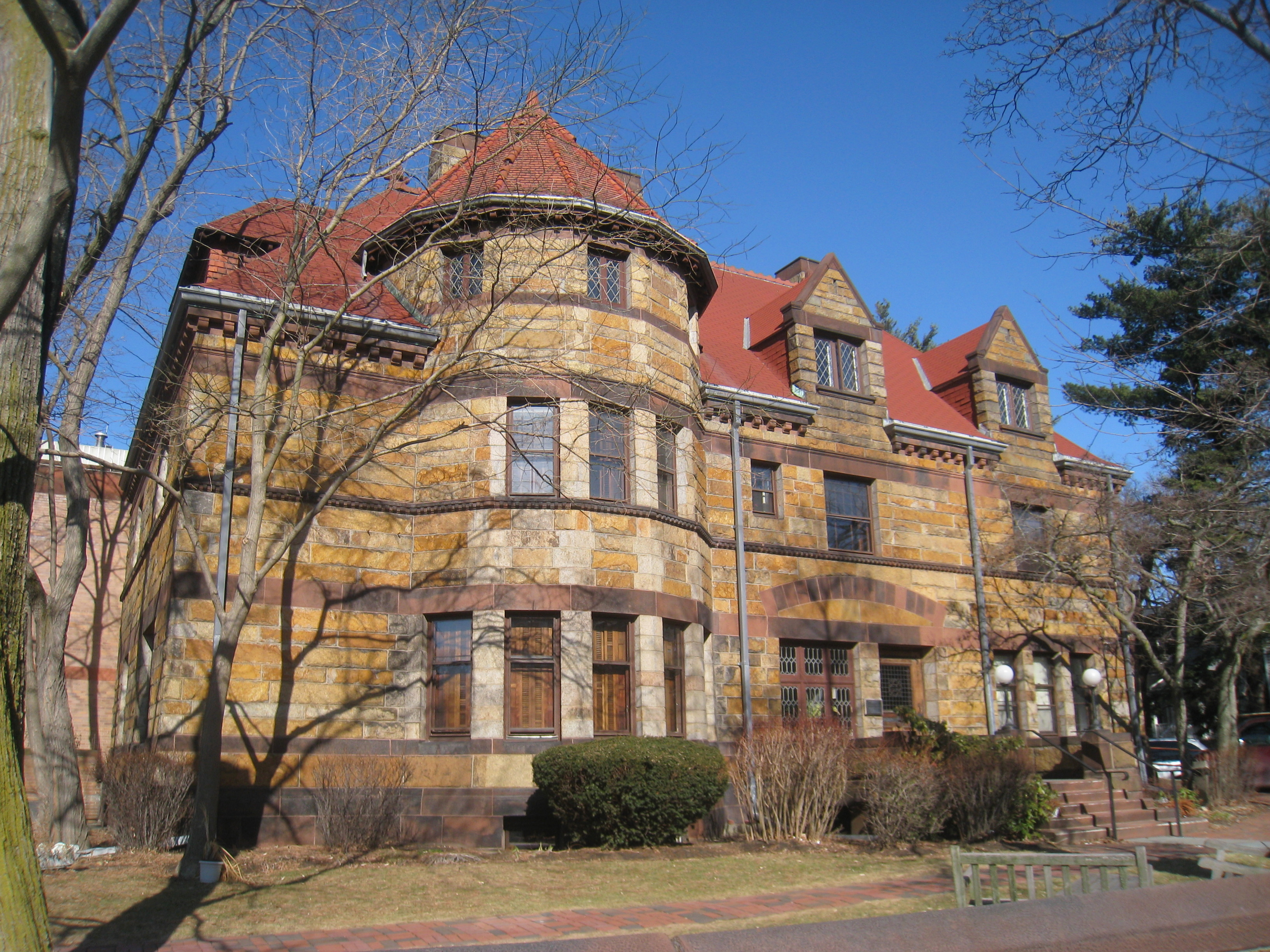

- Location within Massachusetts Location within the United States
- Location: 27 Garden Street, Cambridge, Massachusetts
- Coordinates: 42°22′43.0″N 71°07′24.5″W
- Area: less than one acre
- Built: 1889
- Architect: Longfellow, Alden & Harlow
- Architectural style: Romanesque
- Part of: Follen Street Historic District (ID86001681)
- NRHP reference No.: 79000354

Significant dates
- Added to NRHP: May 10, 1979
- Designated CP: May 19, 1986

The Edwin Abbot House, also known as the Zabriskie House, is an historic house at 27 Garden Street (originally 1 Follen Street) in Cambridge, Massachusetts. Built in 1889 to a design by Longfellow, Alden & Harlow, it is a prominent local example of residential Richardsonian Romanesque architecture. It has served as the principal building of the Longy School (now the Longy School of Music of Bard College) since 1937. It was listed on the National Register of Historic Places in 1979, and included in the Follen Street Historic District in 1986.

== Description and history ==
The Edwin Abbot House stands west of Harvard Square in western Cambridge, at the formerly five-way junction of Concord Avenue, Garden Street, and Follen Street. Follen Street and the eastern portion of Concord Avenue, both quiet residential streets, are isolated from the rest of the intersection by a pedestrian plaza just south of the house. The traditional front facade of the house faces south toward Follen Street, with its major entrance now in the modern addition facing the Garden Street/Concord Avenue intersection. The main block of the house is 2 1/2 stories in height, and is built out of a combination of gray and rust-colored rectangular granite blocks, with red sandstone trim. It is covered by a red slate hip roof. The front facade is divided into three basic sections, the most prominent a projecting polygonal bay topped by a pyramidal roof. The entrance is set in the center section, under a segmented stone arch. Trim beltcourses extend around the building, acting as both sills and lintels for windows. The interior includes a grand entrance hall with high quality woodwork and a grand staircase.

The house was built in 1889 to a design by Longfellow, Alden & Harlow for lawyer and railroad executive Edwin Hale Abbot (1834–1927). It remained in the Abbot family until 1937, and has since then been home to the institution now called the Longy School of Music of Bard College. In the 1960s a modern addition was made to the north, designed by Huygens and Tappe; it houses the Pickman Concert Hall. The rooms of the mansion are used by the school for a variety of academic purposes, including offices and practice spaces.

== See also ==
- National Register of Historic Places listings in Cambridge, Massachusetts
