= Benjamin Abbott =

Benjamin Abbott (1732 – August 14, 1796) was a Methodist Episcopal evangelist.

He was born in the Province of Pennsylvania in 1732 to Mr. Benjamin Abbott and his wife, a daughter of John Burroughs, sheriff of Hunterdon County, New Jersey. His parents died when he was a lad. He started out as a hatter's apprentice in Philadelphia, later leaving that position to work on his brother's farm in New Jersey. He is said to have been addicted to card-playing, cockfighting, drinking, and brawling.

In 1772, he converted to Christianity because of the Methodist preacher Abraham Whitworth, and became a local preacher himself. In 1790, he was ordained a deacon, and later, in 1793, he became an elder of the church and a circuit preacher. In his History of American Methodism (1867), Abel Stevens writes about Abbott, "He had a temperament deeply mystic and subject to marvelous experiences which baffle all scientific explanation". Stevens also noted, "His whole soul seemed pervaded by a certain magnetic power that thrilled his discourses and radiated from his person, drawing, melting and frequently prostrating the stoutest opposers in his congregation. It is probable that no Methodist laborer of his day reclaimed more men from abject vice. He seldom preached without visible results, and his prayers were overwhelming." He died in Salem, New Jersey, in 1796.

== Bibliography ==
- Who Was Who in America, Historical Volume 1607-1896. Chicago: Marquis Who's Who, 1967.
- History of American Methodism; Abel Stevens, New York, NY; Carlton & Porter,1867
- Experience and gospel labors of the Rev. Benjamin Abbott: to which is annexed, A narrative of his life and death; John Firth, New York, NY; T. Mason & G. Lane, 1839
