= John Farr Abbott =

British barrister

- Born: 1756; Abingdon, England
- Died: 22 September 1794 (aged 37–38)
- Occupation: Barrister

John Farr Abbott, sometimes Abbot (1756 – 22 September 1794) was a British barrister. He was a member of Lincoln's Inn, and became a Fellow of the Society of Antiquaries of London and a Fellow of the Royal Society. He also served as Clerk of Rules in the Court of King's Bench. He died in York and is buried in York Minster.

Abbott was born in Abingdon and baptised there in 1756.

== See also ==
- Florence Baron
