= Robert Abbot (theologian) =

English theologian

Robert Abbot (c. 1588 – c. 1662) was an English theologian who promoted puritan doctrines. With a living at Cranbrook, Kent, he wrote anti-Catholic works and cultivated a local circle among the Kent gentry.

== Biography ==
Robert Abbot received his education at Cambridge University, and later at Oxford University. The details of Abbot's ecclesiastical career are somewhat unclear, and can only be pieced together from fragmentary evidence, but based on something he wrote in his work Bee Thankfull London and her Sisters, it is probable that he began his church service with a posting as "assistant to a reverend divine". A note in the margin indicates that the priest in question was "Master Haiward of Wool Church", in Dorset. In 1616 he was appointed by George Abbot to the vicarage of Cranbrook in Kent. His ministry at Cranbrook was regarded as successful, but he was noted for his lack of tolerance towards nonconformists. In 1643, Abbot left Cranbrook, becoming vicar of Southwick, Hampshire. Later, he became pastor at the "extruded" Udall of St Austin's, in London, where he apparently still served in 1657. Between 1657 and 1658, and in 1662, Abbot appears to vanish from record, and his activities are unknown.

== Written works ==
Robert Abbot's books are conspicuous amongst the works of his time by their terseness and variety. In addition to those mentioned above he wrote Triall of our Church-Forsakers (1639), Milk for Babes, or a Mother's Catechism for her Children (1646), and A Christian Family builded by God, or Directions for Governors of Families (1653).

== Identification of father ==
Abbot is sometimes mistakenly described as the son of the Archbishop of Canterbury of the same surname, George Abbot. The misunderstanding may stem from a passage in Robert Abbot's work A Hand of Fellowship to Helpe Keepe out Sinne and Antichrist, in which he thanks the Archbishop for "worldly maintenance," "best earthly countenance" and "fatherly incouragements."
