= Frederic Vaughan Abbot =

US Army brigadier general (1858–1928)

Frederic Vaughan Abbott
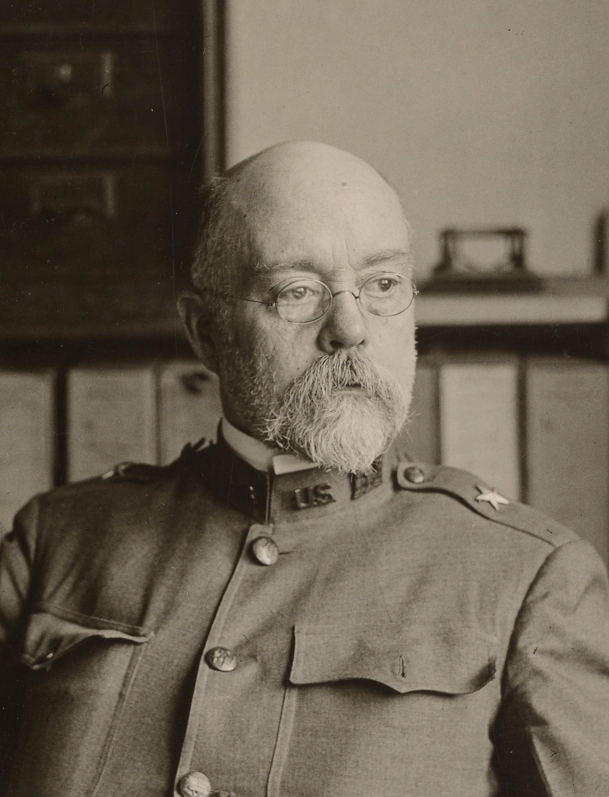
- Abbot as a brigadier general in April 1918
- Born: March 4, 1858; Cambridge, Massachusetts, U.S.
- Died: September 26, 1928 (aged 70); Nonquitt, Massachusetts, U.S.
- Burial place: Mount Auburn Cemetery, Cambridge, Massachusetts
- Education: United States Military Academy
- Spouse: Sara Julie Dehon (m. 1886–1928, his death)
- Children: 3
- Relatives: Henry Larcom Abbot (father); Edwin Hale Abbot (uncle)
- Military career
- Allegiance: United States
- Branch: United States Army
- Service years: 1875 – 1920
- Rank: Brigadier General
- Service number: 0-13436
- Unit: U.S. Army Corps of Engineers
- Commands: Sioux City Engineer District; Northeast Engineer Division; Washington Barracks; School for Engineer Officers; Chief of Engineers (acting)
- Conflicts: Spanish–American War; Philippine–American War; World War I
- Awards: Army Distinguished Service Medal

Frederic Vaughan Abbot (March 4, 1858 – September 26, 1928) was an American military officer who attained the rank of brigadier general in the United States Army. He was most notable for his World War I work as assistant to the Army's Chief of Engineers, a post in which he organized, trained, and deployed Engineer soldiers for service in France.

A native of Cambridge, Massachusetts and the son of Brigadier General Henry Larcom Abbot, Abbot was educated in the schools of Cambridge and at Flushing Institute in Flushing, Queens, New York. He graduated from high school in Cambridge in 1875, then attended the United States Military Academy at West Point. Abbot graduated first in the Class of 1879, and was commissioned as a second lieutenant in the Corps of Engineers.

Abbot specialized in rivers and harbors improvement and coast artillery defenses. During the late 1800s and early 1900s, he worked on projects including construction at Charleston Harbor in Charleston, South Carolina, and improvements to the coastal defenses of South Carolina. He later took charge of river improvements in the midwestern United States, including Wisconsin and Minnesota, as well as command of the Corps of Engineers' Sioux City District. Subsequent assignments included improving the coastal defenses of Boston Harbor and New York City.

During World War I, Abbot received promotion to brigadier general. He was in charge of enlisting and organizing divisional Engineer regiments for service in France, as well as enlisting, organizing, and training replacement troops for soldiers who became casualties in combat. He served as acting Chief of Engineers on several occasions, and received the Army Distinguished Service Medal in recognition of his wartime service.

Abbot retired in 1920, and was a resident of Washington, D.C., and Nonquitt, Massachusetts. He died in Nonquitt on September 26, 1928. Abbot was buried at Mount Auburn Cemetery in Cambridge.

== Early life ==
Abbot was born in Cambridge, Massachusetts on March 4, 1858, the son of Brigadier General Henry Larcom Abbot and Mary Susan Everett Abbot. (Note: In Generals in Khaki, Davis incorrectly spells the name as "Frederick Vaughan Abbott.") Among his relatives was uncle Edwin Hale Abbot. He attended the schools of Cambridge and Flushing Institute in Flushing, Queens, New York, and graduated from high school in Cambridge in 1875.

In March 1875, Abbot received an at-large presidential appointment to the United States Military Academy (USMA) which was scheduled to begin in the summer of 1876. By May 1875, he had been re-nominated to fill a vacancy in the class that was scheduled to commence that July. He attended from July 1875 to June 1879 and graduated ranked first in his class of 67. As with most top graduates of his era, Abbot received his choice of branch assignment, and selected the Corps of Engineers. He received his commission as a second lieutenant and assignment to the USMA faculty.

== Start of career ==
In November 1879, Abbott was posted to an engineer battalion at Willets Point, New York. He assumed command of a company at Willets Point in May 1881, and received promotion to first lieutenant in June. He resumed duty with his battalion in August, and remained at this post until June 1882.

From June 1882 to August 1884, Abbot was assigned to an engineer team led by Oswald Herbert Ernst which carried out river and harbor improvements on the Osage and Mississippi Rivers. From October 1883 to March 1884, he took part in a survey that located the precise boundary between Maryland and Virginia. From 1884 to 1888, Abbot was an assistant to Colonel Quincy A. Gillmore while Gillmore oversaw improvements to the Charleston Harbor in Charleston, South Carolina and served as president of the Mississippi River Commission. He performed special duty in September 1886 when he was assigned to inspect and report on the serviceability of buildings in Charleston which had been damaged by an earthquake.

Abbot served as an assistant to his father from 1886 to 1888 as his father superintended several river and harbor improvements in South Carolina and the removal of wrecks caused during the American Civil War. In addition, Abbot took part in surveys of and improvements to coastal defenses in South Carolina, including Forts Moultrie, Sumter, and Johnson and Castle Pinckney. As part of improving defenses along South Carolina's coast, Abbot also oversaw design and construction of mortar batteries and disappearing gun carriages on Sullivan's Island, Charleston Harbor. He was promoted to captain in July 1888.

== Continued career ==
From 1888 to 1897, Abbot supervised acquisition of torpedo material and employment of torpedoes for use in the defense of Charleston Harbor. (Note: Torpedoes were underwater mines used for harbor defense.) He served on a combined civil and military board that planned improvements to the harbor of Brunswick, Georgia from November 1894 to June 1896. From December 1895 to October 1897 he was engineer of the 6th Lighthouse District, responsible for inspection, maintenance, and repair of facilities in a command that extended extending from the mouth of the Cape Fear River in North Carolina to Jupiter Inlet, Florida. From September 1897 to October 1898, Abbot was in charge of river improvements in Wisconsin and Minnesota, including command of the Corps of Engineers' Sioux City District. During the Spanish–American War, he served on many boards which conducted surveys of harbors and coastal defenses in the eastern United States and made recommendations to improve them. He was promoted to major in July 1898.

Abbot served as assistant to the Army's Chief of Engineers from August 1900 to August 1903. In December 1901, he served on a board which considered options and provided recommendations for defenses at Apra Harbor, Guam, where some Filipino insurgent leaders had been deported as part of the Philippine–American War. From December 1901 to March 1903, Abbott served on a panel of engineer officers that reported on the feasibility of establishing the United States Army War College at Washington Barracks and reconstructing the site so it could host the headquarters of the Chief of Engineers and the Engineer School. From August 1903 to February 1907 he was in charge of manufacturing and distributing Taylor-Raymond 8, 10 and 12‑inch chain ammunition hoists so they could be installed at various coast artillery posts. (Note: Taylor-Raymond hoists for coast artillery were named for the inventors, Major General Harry Taylor and Colonel Robert Rossiter Raymond Sr.) In September 1906, Abbot was promoted to lieutenant colonel. From September 1907 to January 1908, he served in the Philippines, where he oversaw the construction of coast artillery defenses.

From January 1908 to May 1910, Abbot served again as assistant to the Chief of Engineers. In June 1909, he received promotion to colonel. From May 1910 to June 1913, Abbot was stationed in Boston, where he was in charge of improving the coastal defenses of Boston Harbor. During this posting, Abbot also oversaw improvements to Lake Champlain and rivers and harbors in Vermont and New Hampshire.

Abbot was in charge of river, harbor, and fortifications projects in Rhode Island and Massachusetts from March 1911 to August 1912. From June 1911 to August 1912, he was a member of the board that considered fire control and searchlight positions for Narragansett Bay. From June 1913 to October 1917, Abbot was posted to New York City as commander of the Corps of Engineers' Northeast Division, where he oversaw river and harbor improvements on the coasts of New York and New Jersey. Abbot was in charge of the coastal defenses of New York City from July 1915 to October 1917. In August 1917, Abbot was promoted to temporary brigadier general.

== World War I ==
From October 1917 to October 1919, Abbot served as principal assistant to the Chief of Engineers. In this assignment, Abbot took charge of enlisting and organizing divisional Engineer regiments for service in France. In addition, he oversaw enlisting, organizing, and training Engineer soldiers with technical specialties as well as replacement troops for soldiers who became casualties in combat. He commanded the Washington Barracks post, which included sub‑posts at Camp Leach and Camp A. A. Humphreys. Abbot was also commandant of the School for Engineer Officers at Washington Barracks from October 1917 to October 1918. From February to April 1918, he served as acting Chief of Engineers while the Chief of Engineers performed temporary wartime duty in France.

== Post-World War I ==
From November 1918 to February 1920, Abbot was a member of the board that designed the facilities for the Engineer School at Camp A. A. Humphreys. In May 1919 he reverted to his permanent rank of colonel. Abbot served again as acting Chief of Engineers from October 1919 to February 1920. He was retired for disability in May 1920.

== Retirement and death ==
In retirement, Abbot was a resident of Washington, D.C., and Nonquitt, Massachusetts (part of the town of Dartmouth). He died in Nonquitt on September 26, 1928. He was buried at Mount Auburn Cemetery in Cambridge, Massachusetts. Abbot received the Army Distinguished Service Medal for his World War I service. In 1930, the U.S. Congress passed legislation permitting the general officers of World War I to retire at the highest rank they had held. As a result, Abbot was posthumously promoted to brigadier general on the retired list.

== Personal life ==
In 1886, Abbot married Sara Julie Dehon of Charleston, South Carolina, the granddaughter of Theodore Dehon. They were the parents of three children—twin daughters Marion and Elinor, and son Henry.
