= Walter P. Abbott =

American politician

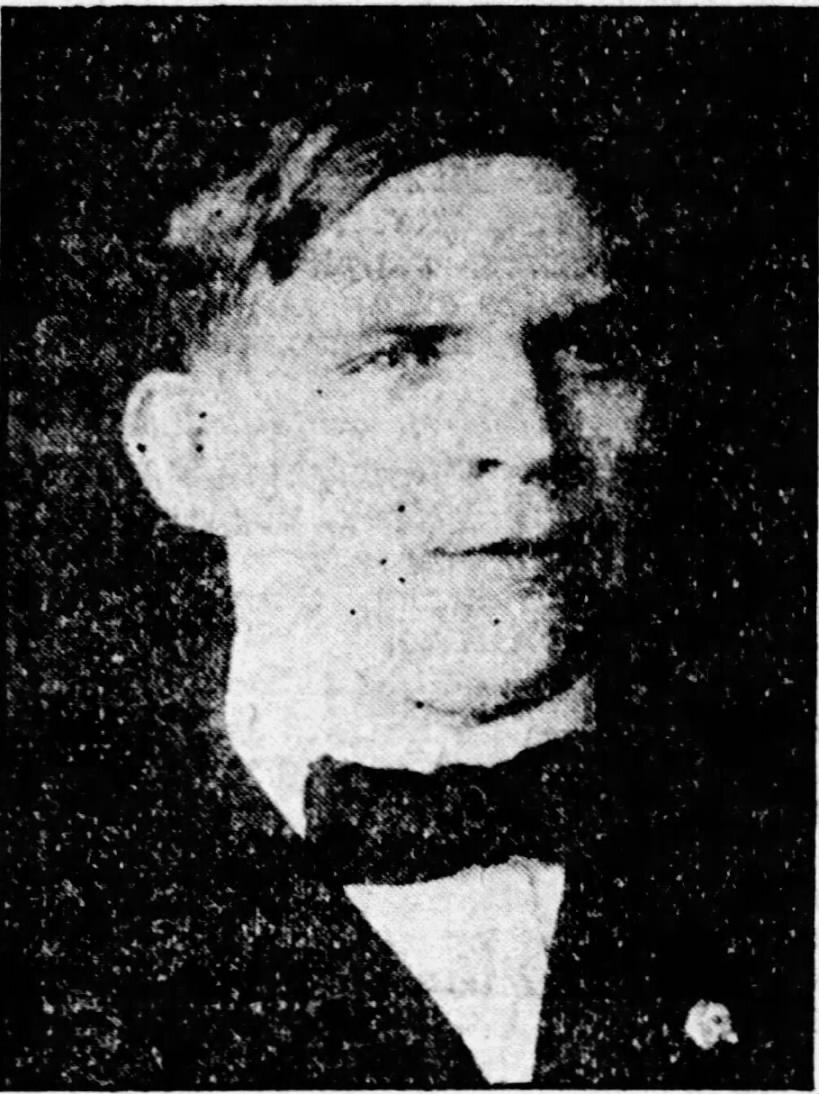
- 1919

Member of the Mississippi State Senate from the 9th district
- In office January 1920 – January 1924
- Preceded by: William C. Bowman
- Succeeded by: Louis A. Benoist

Personal details
- Born: July 6, 1887 Nashville, Tennessee, U.S.
- Died: August 26, 1967 (aged 80) Natchez, Mississippi, U.S.
- Party: Democratic

Walter Phillips Abbott (July 6, 1887 - April 26, 1967) was an American newspaper owner and Democratic politician. He represented the 9th District of the Mississippi State Senate from 1920 to 1924, and was the Mayor of Natchez, Mississippi, from 1952 to 1956.

== Biography ==
Walter Phillips Abbott was born on July 6, 1887, in Nashville, Tennessee. He later moved to Natchez, Mississippi. He first became involved with the Democratic Party in 1911. In 1919, Abbott was elected to represent the 9th District (Adams County) in the Mississippi State Senate, and served one term from 1920 to 1924. During his term, Abbott served as the Chairman of the Senate's Printing Committee, and he also served on the County Affairs; Fees and Salaries; and Unfinished Business committees. From 1928 to 1932, Abbott served as the County Sheriff of Adams County. He then served as a chancery clerk from 1932 to 1952. In 1949, Abbott organized the Natchez Times newspaper which he ran for nine years.

On December 20, 1951, Abbott was elected Mayor of Natchez in a special election to succeed Audley B. Connor who had been appointed county sheriff and tax collector. Abbott's term lasted six months. In 1952, Abbott ran unopposed in an election for a short 18-month term. In May 1954, Abbott ran for re-election and won the Democratic primary, defeating local union president Clyde Mullins. In May 1956, Abbott ran for re-election in the Democratic primary against John Nosser and Troy Watkins. He lost the second primary to Watkins, who succeeded Abbott as mayor on July 2, 1956. After losing the election, Abbott announced his retirement from politics. Abbott died on the morning of August 26, 1967, in a Natchez hospital.

== Personal life ==
Abbott was a Presbyterian. Abbott married Mary Clothilde Abbott (who was not related to him) of Natchez, Mississippi, in that city on October 31, 1914. They had a son, Walter Phillips Abbott Jr. (August 30, 1919 - March 29, 1975), and three grandchildren at the time of Walter's death.
