= Richard Abbot =

English poet

Richard Abbot (1818 – 15 July 1904) was an English poet. He was born in Burton-in-Kendal, Westmorland (now Cumbria). His father worked as a subcontractor on the Lancaster and Kendal Canal, which was then being extended to Tewitfield. His mother died when he was three years old. Abbot's initial education, from the age of four, was undertaken at Dame schools in Shap Fell and Galgate, Lancashire, before he studied at a National school in Ingleton, North Yorkshire. When the family was in Ingleton, Abbot's father began farming on the fells of Ingleborough, and from the age of 11, Abbot assisted him as a shepherd. Around 5 years later, his father suffered a serious accident that affected his sight and brain function, forcing him to end his farming business. Abbot gained new employment as a labourer on the construction of railways in Scotland, and parts of northern England. At the age of 50, he became the manager of a limestone quarry in the parish of Forcett, North Yorkshire. He continued in this position for 32 years. After retiring, he passed the quarry to his son. He also had two daughters. He died at his home in Forcett in 1904, at the age of 86. He is buried in the graveyard of St Cuthbert's Church in Forcett.

Four collections of his poetry were published between 1868 and 1901. In 1884, he became a Fellow of the Royal Historical Society. His 1879 collection The pen, the press, and the sword features a lithograph portrait by Ralph Hedley, and another portrait is included in his 1901 collection The Wanderer. His poetry was also printed in magazines in England and colonial territories. They often appeared in the Teesdale Mercury. Three of his poems appeared in North Country Poets: "The Song of Ingleton Bells", "O, Turn Aside Thy Loving Eyes" and "Fading Beauty".

== Published works ==
- War!: a descriptive poem on passing events (Bishop Auckland: G. E. Briggs, 1868)
- War, Canto III: Raby, Keverstone, Staindrop, etc.; The railway jubilee; Ode to Ingleborough, and other select poems and songs (London: Simpkin, Marshall & Co., 1876)
- The pen, the press, and the sword, with other poems and balsams for wounded hearts (Darlington: William Dresser, 1879)
- The Wanderer, in special trains of grave thoughts, with other poems and songs (Darlington: William Dresser, 1901)
