= Edwin Hale Abbot =

American lawyer

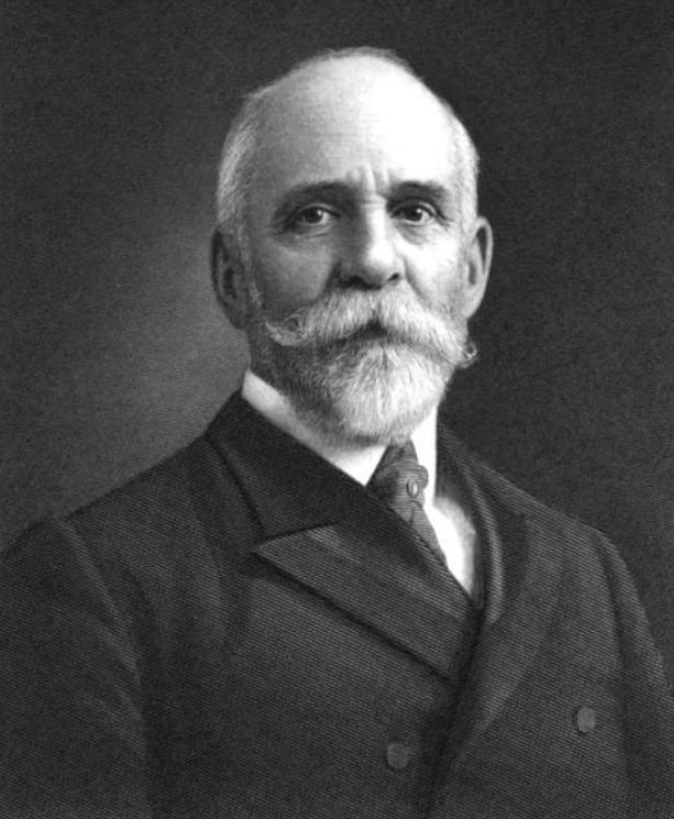
- Born: January 26, 1834; Beverly, Massachusetts, U.S.
- Died: May 30, 1927 (aged 93); Cambridge, Massachusetts, U.S.

Edwin Hale Abbot (1834–1927) was a lawyer and railroad executive, active in Boston and Milwaukee.

== Biography ==
Abbot was born in Beverly, Massachusetts on January 26, 1834. His relatives included brother Henry Larcom Abbot and nephew Frederic Vaughan Abbot. He was educated at Harvard University (BA 1855, AM 1858, and LL.D. 1861), and practiced law in Boston from 1862–76. During this time, he served as an attorney for the Alabama Claims, a series of claims for damages by the United States government against the government of Great Britain for the assistance given to the Confederate cause during the American Civil War. In 1873, Abbot was named general solicitor and a director of the Wisconsin Central Railway. He moved to Milwaukee in 1876 and subsequently became the railway's president, in which role he served until 1890. He was also a director of the Northern Pacific Railway. He was elected Associate Fellow of the American Academy of Arts and Sciences in 1924.

He died at his home in Cambridge, Massachusetts on May 30, 1927.

His mansion in Cambridge, built in 1889, the Edwin Abbot House, is now part of the Longy School of Music.

== See also ==
- List of railroad executives
