= Henry Larcom Abbot =

American military engineer and Army officer (1831-1927)

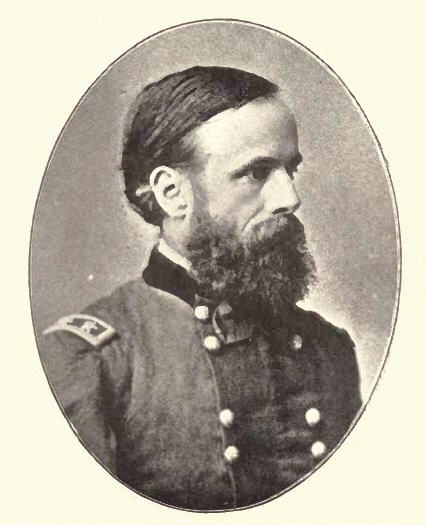
- Henry Larcom Abbot
- Born: August 13, 1831; Beverly, Massachusetts, U.S.
- Died: October 1, 1927 (aged 96); Cambridge, Massachusetts, U.S.
- Burial place: Mount Auburn Cemetery, Cambridge, Massachusetts
- Spouse: Mary Susan Everett Abbot
- Relatives: Frederic Vaughan Abbot (son) (Note: in Generals in Khaki, Davis incorrectly spells the name as "Frederick Vaughan Abbott."); Edwin Hale Abbot (brother); Joseph Hale Abbot (father); Fanny Ellingwood Larcom (mother)
- Military career
- Allegiance: United States
- Branch: United States Army; Union Army
- Service years: 1854–1895
- Rank: Brigadier General
- Commands: 1st Connecticut Heavy Artillery
- Conflicts: American Civil War; First Battle of Bull Run; Peninsula Campaign; Siege of Yorktown; Siege of Petersburg; Second Battle of Fort Fisher

Henry Larcom Abbot (August 13, 1831 – October 1, 1927) was a military engineer and career officer in the United States Army. He served in the Union Army during the American Civil War and was appointed brevet brigadier general of volunteers for his contributions in engineering and artillery. In 1866 he received additional brevet appointments as major general of volunteers and brigadier general in the Regular Army. He conducted several scientific studies of the Mississippi River with captain, later Major General Andrew A. Humphreys. After his retirement, Abbot served as a consultant for the locks on the Panama Canal. He was elected a Fellow of the American Academy of Arts and Sciences in 1863.

== Military life ==
Abbot attended West Point and graduated second in his class, which included Jeb Stuart and G. W. Custis Lee with a degree in military engineering in 1854. He initially wanted to join the Artillery, but shortly after graduation, a classmate convinced him to choose the Engineers. He was commissioned as a brevet second lieutenant in the U.S. Army on July 1, 1854, second lieutenant on October 2, 1855, and first lieutenant on July 1, 1857. In 1855, Abbot was assigned to work with Lieutenant Robert Williamson's Pacific Railroad Survey in California and Oregon.

While serving in the Army, Abbot and Captain Andrew Humphreys conducted several scientific studies of the Mississippi River. They most notably studied the Mississippi river's flow starting at the Ohio River and going southward down to its base level at the Gulf of Mexico. They attempted to use several European formulas for stream discharge they had learned at West Point, but came to discover that they were all flawed. They then developed their own formula which ultimately also proved to be faulty as they forgot to account for the roughness of slopes in river canals. Regardless, it influenced the evolution of hydrology and was instrumental in the establishment of a United States Army Engineer School at Fort Totten in New York City.

=== Civil War ===
At the outbreak of the Civil War, Abbot was assigned to Brigadier General Irvin McDowell's forces and was wounded at the First Battle of Bull Run. He later became a topographical engineer in the Army of the Potomac during the Peninsula Campaign and aide-de-camp to Brig. Gen. Andrew Humphreys. During this campaign he was brevetted major for his service at the siege of Yorktown. On July 18, 1862, Abbot was promoted to captain in the Regular Army and was assigned to the staff of Brig. Gen. John G. Barnard until November 11, 1862. He was then briefly assigned as a Topographical Engineer in the Department of the Gulf. On January 19, 1863, he was appointed colonel of the 1st Connecticut Heavy Artillery but on March 3, 1863, was transferred to the Washington Defenses, where he commanded a brigade.

In May 1864, he was transferred to command the Artillery during the siege of Petersburg. On December 12, 1864, President Abraham Lincoln nominated Abbot for appointment to the grade of brevet brigadier general of volunteers to rank from August 1, 1864, and the U.S. Senate confirmed the appointment on February 20, 1865. In December 1864 he was placed in command of all siege artillery in the Army of the Potomac and Army of the James, which were besieging Petersburg. In January 1865, General Alfred H. Terry requested General Abbot accompany his expeditionary force to Fort Fisher. Abbot commanded a provisional brigade of siege artillery during the successful Second Battle of Fort Fisher.

Abbot was mustered out of the volunteer service on September 25, 1865. On January 13, 1866, President Andrew Johnson nominated Abbot for appointment to the grade of brevet major general of volunteers to rank from March 13, 1865, and the U.S. Senate confirmed the appointment on March 12, 1865. On July 17, 1866, President Johnson nominated Abbot for appointment to the grade of brevet brigadier general in the Regular Army to rank from March 13, 1865, and the U.S. Senate confirmed the appointment on July 23, 1865.

=== Post-Civil War ===
In the post-war years, Abbot continued to serve in the U.S. Army Engineers. He was promoted to major on November 11, 1865. He was assigned to the command of the engineer battalion at Willet's Point, New York. He created the army's Engineer School of Application there, and served on numerous boards, including the Board on the Use of Iron in Permanent Defenses, the Board of Engineers for Fortifications, the Gun Foundry Board, the Board on Fortifications and Other Defenses, and the Board of Ordnance and Fortifications. Abbot's influence can be seen in many facets of the coast defense systems of the United States of that period, particularly in the submarine mine system, and in the use of seacoast mortars. Abbot advocated the massing of 16 mortars in 4 sets of 4, which would fire simultaneously at the enemy warships. The plan became known as the "Abbot Quad".

After his retirement from the Army, Abbot continued to work as a civil engineer and was employed as a consultant to Comité Technique and Comité Statutaire for the locks on the Panama Canal between 1897 and 1900. He was appointed to the Board of Consulting Engineers by Theodore Roosevelt and served between 1905 and 1906 after the Americans took control of building the canal. He was given the task to prepare plans for canal construction and was able to convince Roosevelt and Secretary of War William Howard Taft to approve a lock canal rather than a sea-level canal. In 1915, he was part of the Panama Canal Slide Committee.

== Retirement ==
Abbot retired as a colonel on August 13, 1895. On April 23, 1904, he was appointed Brigadier General, U.S.A., retired. He died on October 1, 1927, at Cambridge, Massachusetts and is buried in Mount Auburn Cemetery, Cambridge.

== Honors ==
Abbot was a member of the National Academy of Sciences and American Philosophical Society, received an honorary law degree from Harvard University, and became a Fellow of the American Academy of Arts and Sciences in 1863. The Oregon military training center Camp Abbot, Abbot Pass in Clackamas County, Oregon, and Mount Abbot are all his namesake. He is also one of the 158 names of people important to Oregon's history that are painted in the House and Senate chambers of the Oregon State Capitol. His name is in the Senate chamber.

== Publications ==
- Abbot, H. L. (1883). "Mississippi (River)" . In Baynes, T. S.; Smith, W. R. (eds.). Encyclopædia Britannica. Vol. 16 (9th ed.). New York: Charles Scribner's Sons.
- Abbot, Henry L. "The Present Status of the Panama Canal." Engineering News 40 (October 6, 1898): 210–213. An optimistic view of the progress made by the new French canal company and its plans for future construction. Emphasizes the disadvantages of the proposed Nicaragua route. Published separately by the New York Evening Post Printing House, 1898.
- Abbot, Henry L. "The New Panama Canal." Forum 26 (November 1898): 343–53. Argues in favor of a Panama canal even though it would be in French hands, and urges Americans to abandon further consideration of a Nicaragua canal. Also printed separately by the Forum Publishing Company, 1898. Reprinted as Senate Document No. 41, 55th Congress, 3d Session, December 21, 1898, and as "General Abbot on the Panama Canal," Engineering Record 39 (January 14, 1899): 137–40.
- Abbot, Henry L. (?) "The New Panama Canal." Scientific American 80 (February 4, 1899): 73–75. Possibly by Abbot. "The present article is written for the purpose of putting the public in possession of the facts regarding the present status and future prospects of this undertaking." (p. 73) Discusses the French canal company's international Comité Technique, of which Abbot was a member; the Culebra Cut; control of the Chagres River; health concerns; and relationship of the new canal company to the old company.
- Abbot, Henry L. "Climatology of the Isthmus of Panama, Including the Temperature, Winds, Barometric Pressure, and Precipitation." Monthly Weather Review 27 (May 1899): 198–203. Temperature, barometric pressure, and precipitation tables compiled by the old and new French canal companies. "In tropical regions it is not the excessively high temperatures which increase the difficulties of out-door labor and construction, but those which remain permanently high and are accompanied by great humidity of the air and heavy rainfall . . . . " (p. 201) Rainfall comparable to areas of the United States near the Gulf of Mexico. The Weather Bureau issued, as a separate designated W. B. No. 201, a "slightly modified" (p. 3) version of this article.
- Abbot, Henry L. "Climatology of the Isthmus of Panama." Monthly Weather Review 27 (July 1899): 302–03. Supplemental to May 1899 article. Updates rainfall figures to 1899.
- Abbot, Henry L. "Meteorology of Panama." Monthly Weather Review 27 (October 1899): 463. More rainfall and temperature data for 1899.
- Abbot, Henry L. "Contributions to the Meteorology of Panama." Monthly Weather Review 28 January 1900: 7. Hourly temperatures and barometric pressure at Alhajuela and La Boca, observed by personnel of the New Panama Canal Company, autumn of 1899.
- Abbot, Henry L. "Rainfall and Drainage in the Upper Chagres River." Monthly Weather Review 28 (June 1900): 243–44. Figures showing that "no fear of a lack of water in the dry season need be entertained with the reserves contemplated by the new French [Panama Canal] company." (p. 244)
- Abbot, Henry L. "The Best Isthmian Canal." Atlantic Monthly 86 (December 1900): 844–48. "[T]his claim of gain of time by Nicaragua must be relegated to the class of visionary arguments so often advanced to offset the solid merits of the Panama route." (p. 848).
- Abbot, Henry L. (Communication on "The Present Condition and Prospects of the Panama Canal Works," by James Thomas Ford, pp. 150–70.) Minutes of the Proceedings of the Institution of Civil Engineers (London) 144 (February 1901): 199–202. Regulation of the Chagres River is essential for a canal with locks and dams. Data on the discharge of the river at various locations; estimates of time needed for lockages.
- Abbot, Henry L. "Present Condition of the Panama Canal." Engineering Magazine 22 (January 1902): 487–92. (Editor's introduction to Abbot's article "International Aspects of the Isthmian Canal," pp. 485–87.) Abbot: there are "only three formidable difficulties": "the cut at the continental divide, regulation of the Chagres River, and the tropical climate." Despite these problems, "Nature has placed on the Isthmus of Panama far fewer obstructions to the construction of a ship canal than on any other possible route between the oceans." (p. 488). Abbot favors use of black laborers and suggests that American capital, not the government, should buy out the French company.
- Abbot, Henry L. "Why The Panama Canal Should Be Selected." Collier's Weekly 28 (February 8, 1902): 5. Panama route is preferable to one in Nicaragua because it would be shorter; no active volcanoes within ca.200 miles of Panama; lower annual rainfall; Colón a better port than Greytown; cheaper to operate and maintain a canal in Panama; rates for insurance and shipping from United States ports would be lower. "Whatever 'sentimental feeling' may exist in favor of the Nicaragua route, it would appear that if those interested in commercial expansion appreciated these facts there would be little doubt which canal would be demanded."
- Abbot, Henry L. "Mean Barometric Pressure at Sea Level on the American Isthmus." Monthly Weather Review 31 (March 1902): 124–25. "These figures certainly indicate a remarkable uniformity of barometric pressure in this tropical region throughout the year." (p. 125).
- Abbot, Henry L. "The Panama Canal Question." Medical News (April 12, 1902):707. Communicates translation of health information, 1898-1901, submitted by Dr. (Elie?) Lacroisade, medical director of the New Panama Canal Company. Abbot: "The marked improvement in health since the early days of the enterprise is forcibly presented by these official hospital records."
- Abbot, Henry L. "Earthquakes and the Isthmian Canal." Collier's Weekly 29 (July 12, 1902):7. "[The commercial interests] of the world will protect us against placing a canal in the region of greatest danger from earthquakes to be found anywhere on the continent [i.e., Nicaragua], where we can have a safer, shorter and cheaper and in every respect better route elsewhere [i.e., Panama]."
- Abbot, Henry L. "The Panama Canal and the Regulation of the Chagres River." Engineering Magazine 24 (December 1902): 329–68. Abbot had carefully studied the river and the data amassed by the two French canal companies and concluded that "Far from being a menace, the Chagres is a most useful friend." (p. 366) Topics include: "Topography of the Basin above Bohio"; "Regimen of the Chagres"; "Discharge of the Chagres"; "Great Floods of the Chagres"; "Regulation of the Floods"; "Ratio between Downfall and Drainage"; "Water Supply in the Dry Season."
- Abbot, Henry L. "Climatology of the Isthmus of Panama." Monthly Weather Review 31 (March 1903): 117–24. Because it appeared likely that the United States would build the Panama Canal "it has seemed to me desirable to prepare a summary bringing these records [compiled by the New Panama Canal Company] up to date, with an analysis designed to develop the information they convey." (p. 117) Data on temperatures, rainfall, barometric pressure, winds, and health on the isthmus. Cites medical director Dr. Lacroisade as authority for asserting that health conditions had improved and that mortality and disease rates had declined in the last years of French activity.
- Abbot, Henry L. "Note on the Barometric Pressure at Colon." Monthly Weather Review 31 (April 1903):1 88. Update of his March 1903 article.
- Abbot, Henry L. "The Panama Canal: The Dual versus the Single-Lake Project." Engineering Magazine 25 (June 1903): 321–26. Followed by a reply by George S. Morison, "The Advantages of Lake Bohio at the Higher Level," pp. 326–28. Abbot favors a dual lake system. Early planning called for a lake at Bohio.
- Abbot, Henry L. "The Solution of the Isthmian-Canal Problem." Engineering Magazine 26 (January 1904): 481–87. A Nicaragua canal would be "ill-suited to the transit of ocean shipping." (p. 483). Answers objections to the Panama route. "[N]ow that the problem has been thoroughly studied, and that the facts are known, and that fortune has enabled us to secure the better route, we have good reason to rejoice that hasty action was delayed, and that no mistake has been made in the selection." (p. 487)
- Abbot, Henry L. "Disposition of Rainfall in the Basin of the Chagres." Monthly Weather Review 32 (February 1904): 5–-65. "In connection with their other technical investigations the New Panama Canal Company found it obligatory to study some of these questions [relating to rainfall, evaporation, absorption by plants, and ground water] with considerable attention, and this paper is written in the hope that the resulting facts and figures may prove useful in throwing light upon the more general problem of the ultimate disposition of rainfall." (p. 57) Article covers the basin of the Chagres above Bohio. See Abbot's 1907 article "Rainfall and Outflow Above Bohio."
- Abbot, Henry L. "Hourly Climatic Records of the Isthmus of Panama." Monthly Weather Review 32 (June 1904): 267–72. Mostly tables of temperature, rainfall, and barometric pressure data collected by engineers of the New Panama Canal Company at Alhajuela and Bohio. Abbot notes that the company's rights and property had been transferred to the United States in April.
- Abbot, Henry L. "The Regimen of the Chagres." Harvard Engineering Journal 3 (June 1904): 153–62. Knowledge of the regimen of the river "has been secured by the elaborate and long continued investigations of the New French Company." (p. 153) "The old popular belief that the regulation of the floods of the Chagres presents unprecedented difficulties . . . is erroneous." (p. 154)
- Abbot, Henry L. "Natural Conditions Affecting the Construction of the Panama Canal." Engineering Magazine 27 (August 1904):721-30. "While no one will claim that the climate of the Isthmus is salubrious, it is certain that much wild exaggeration has been circulated . . . ." (p. 727) No danger of earthquakes. The Chagres River "is marvelously adapted to the needs of the canal." (p. 729)
- Abbot, Henry L. Problems of the Panama Canal, Including Climatology of the Isthmus, Physics and Hydraulics of the River Chagres, Cut at the Continental Divide and Discussions of Plans for the Waterway. New York: Macmillan, 1905. "[A]n unbiased and truthful statement of how the work appears to a retired officer of the Corps of Engineers . . . who has spent his life in the prosecution of public works confided to that Corps . . . ." (p. vi) Written before the United States took over the project from the French. The author believes that Americans could have a voice in the operation of the canal by purchasing stocks and bonds of the French company, and that the United States could control transits across the canal by its domination of the surrounding seas. The appendix presents a strong case for a canal through Panama rather than Nicaragua. Some of the content is based on Abbot's periodical articles, but much of it is new. See also the second (1907) edition.
- Abbot, Henry L. "The Revival of De Lesseps' Sea-Level Plan for the Panama Canal." Engineering Magazine 28 (February 1905): 721–26. "Why . . . waste an extra ten or a dozen years and untold millions of dollars to execute a scheme which the investigations of thirty-five years have demonstrated to possess only a sentimental merit due to the imagination of M. de Lesseps?" (p. 726) Cites advances in lock canal technology in recent years.
- Abbot, Henry L. "The Panama Canal Under Control of the United States." Harvard Engineering Journal 5 (April 1906): 1–13. Discusses the government of the Canal Zone; duties of the Isthmian Canal Commission; administration of the Panama Railroad; the work of Chief Engineer John F. Stevens, especially on the Culebra Cut; appointment of the Board of Consulting Engineers; the majority and minority reports of the board. Abbot responds to criticism that little had been accomplished in the building of the canal, pointing out that needed preliminary work was being done.
- Abbot, Henry L. "The Panama Canal. Projects of the Board of Consulting Engineers." Engineering Magazine 31 (July 1906): 481–91. The board, of which Abbot was a member, was unable to agree whether to recommend a sea-level or lock canal. Abbot, who had studied both types throughout the world, likens the Panama Canal to the Sault Ste. Marie Canal.
- Abbot, Henry L. "Hydrology of the Chagres River." George Washington University Bulletin 5 (December 1906): 48–54. The Panama Canal would follow the valley of the Chagres for much of the way and the river would provide water for the operation of the locks. "[I]t may be said that the dominating element in deciding what type of canal should be adopted at the Isthmus of Panama is neither more nor less than this eccentric little river; and that the long years that have been devoted to its study have been well expended. They have made certainly known that all which is required is a judicious system of regulation by well understood engineering methods." (p. 54) Abbot was then professor of hydraulic engineering at George Washington University.
- Abbot, Henry L. Problems of the Panama Canal, Including Climatology of the Isthmus, Physics and Hydraulics of the River Chagres, Cut at the Continental Divide, and Discussion of Plants for the Waterway, with History from 1890 to Date. 2d ed. New York: Macmillan, 1907. "It has seemed desirable to extend this new edition [of the 1905 work] to cover the progress of events since the transfer of the work to the United States . . . . This has been accomplished by adding a new chapter to the historical portion of the book; by explaining and discussing . . . the new projects resulting from the studies of the Board of Consulting Engineers . . . and by introducing recent and valuable climatological and hydraulic data . . . ." (p. vii)
- Abbot, Henry L. "Rainfall and Outflow Above Bohio, in the Valley of the Chagres." Monthly Weather Review 35 (February 1907): 74–75. Update of Abbot's articles of June 1900 and February 1904.
- Abbot, Henry L. "The Preparatory Period, Panama Canal." Harvard Engineering Journal 6 (June 1907):1-10. Much preliminary work needed before "making the dirt fly," as demanded by the impatient American public. Discusses the Isthmian Canal Commission, Panama Railroad, Board of Consulting Engineers, congressional legislation, reorganization of the canal's administrative system, accomplishments of Dr. William C. Gorgas, flooding, rainfall, and work at Gatun and the Culebra Cut.
- Abbot, Henry L. "Present Status of the Panama Project." Annals of the American Academy of Political and Social Science 31 (January 1908):12-35. Discusses lack of danger from earthquakes, the need to study the Chagres River, climate, Gorgas' success in improving health conditions, lock construction, water supply, and the government of the Canal Zone. "In fine, an era of rapid progress has been inaugurated under an efficient organization, with every promise of success, and the expenditures have been kept within reasonable limits." (p. 35).
- Abbot, Henry L. Hydraulics of the Chagres River." Engineering Magazine 39 (June 1910): 377–84. "In projecting a canal across the Isthmus of Panama, the dominating element is not the volume of excavation at the Continental Divide, but rather the hydraulics of the Chagres River whose valley must be traversed throughout the greater part of the route." (p. 377)
- Abbot, Henry L. "Hydrology of the Isthmus of Panama." In Professional Memoirs, Corps of Engineers, United States Army, and Engineer Department at Large 7 (November–December 1915): 657–62. "The Panama Canal being now opened to traffic, there remains for study only one important hydraulic problem—the sufficiency of the available water supply to meet the needs for lockage, for mechanical power to operate the canal and railroad, and for the electric lighting of the Canal Zone." (p. 657). See also Caleb Mills Saville, "Hydrology of the Panama Canal." Transactions of the Society of Civil Engineers 76 (1913): 985–987, "With Discussions by Henry L. Abbot and W. E. Fuller."
