= Fred Abbott =

American baseball player (1874-1935)

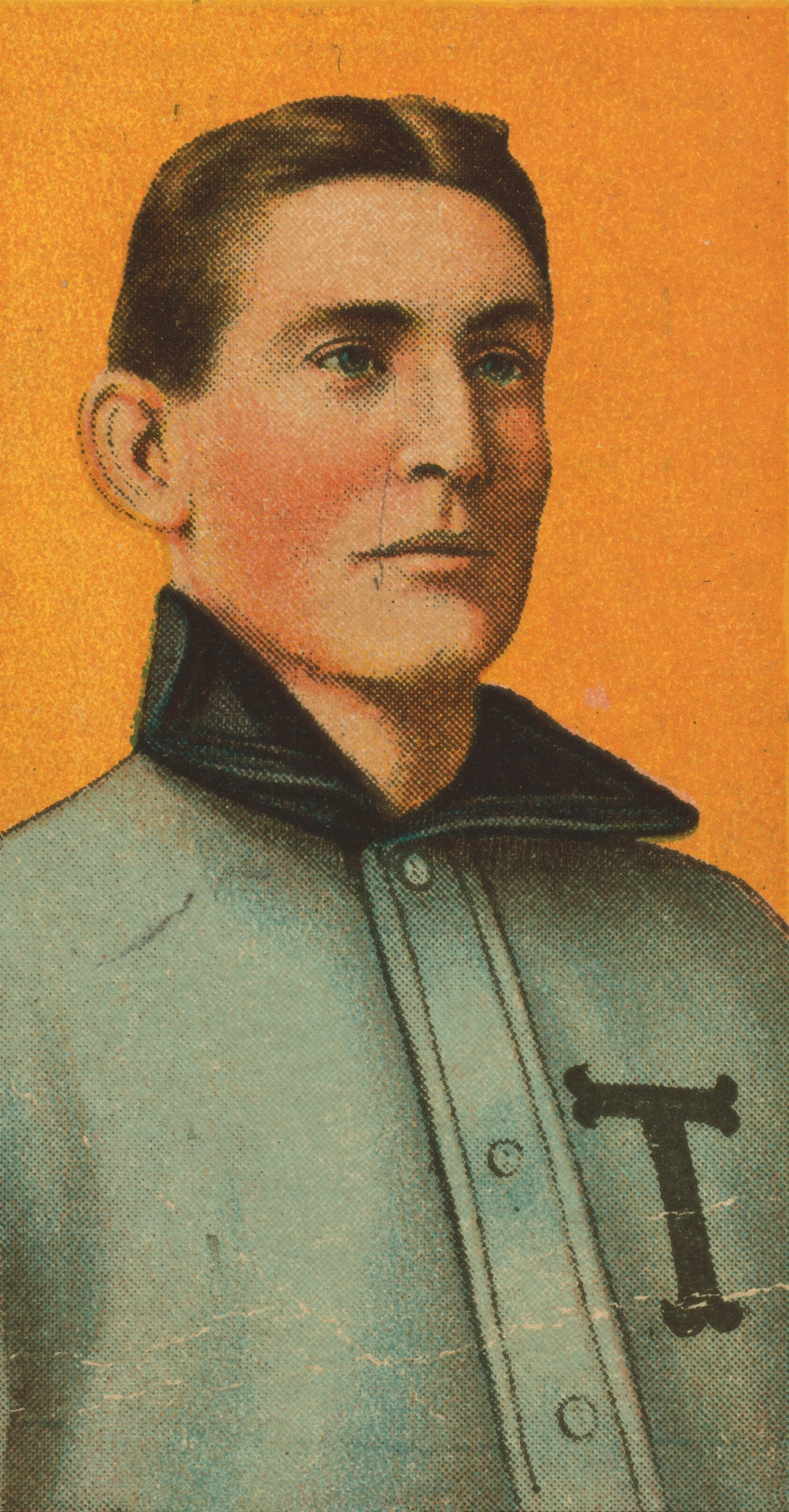
- Catcher
- Born: October 22, 1874; Versailles, Ohio, U.S.
- Died: June 11, 1935 (aged 60); Los Angeles, California, U.S.
- Batted: Right Threw: Right

MLB debut
- April 29, 1903, for the Cleveland Naps

Last MLB appearance
- September 20, 1905, for the Philadelphia Phillies

MLB statistics
- Batting average: .209
- Home runs: 1
- Runs batted in: 49
- Stats at Baseball Reference

Teams
- Cleveland Naps (1903–1904); Philadelphia Phillies (1905)

Harry Frederick Abbott (born Harry Frederick Winbigler; October 22, 1874 – June 11, 1935) was an American Major League Baseball catcher. He played three seasons of Major League baseball for the Cleveland Naps and the Philadelphia Phillies.

He began his career as a teenager with Marion (Interstate League) in 1891. Abbot played with independent Ohio teams Springfield and Dayton in 1892 and 1893 respectively before joining the San Antonio Missionaries of the Texas-Southern League in 1895. In 1897 he was playing with the Cairo Egyptians in the Central League. By 1898, he was with the Southern League's New Orleans Pelicans, where he batted .265 in 15 games, while playing mostly in the outfield. Abbott joined Danville of the Indiana–Illinois League the following season, and remained with them when they joined the Central League the next year. Abbott batted a very respectable .318 with three home runs and stole 14 bases over 83 games. He rejoined the New Orleans Pelicans, batting .296 for them in 1901, and .289 in 1902, where he played catcher, shortstop, second, and first base, playing over 100 each season. Abbott made his major league baseball debut with the Cleveland Naps a week into the 1903 season, on April 29 against the St. Louis Browns. He would go on to play a total of 77 games as a backup catcher behind Harry Bemis, batting .235 with a single home run to go with 25 RBI and eight stolen bases.

1904 found Abbott's playing time diminished, along with his batting average. Splitting his time in the backup role this time, with Fritz Buelow and rookie Harry Ostdiek Abbott batted a meager .169 with no homers and only a dozen RBI before being sent down to the Columbus Senators of the American Association where he finished the season going .222 over 34 games. In January 1905 he was traded to the Philadelphia Phillies for infielder Rudy Hulswitt.

In his final season in the major leagues Abbott was used primarily as backup for Phillies starter Red Dooin Abbott nearly duplicated his previous season with the Naps, hitting .195 to go with his dozen RBI in 42 games. Following the season his contract was purchased by the Toledo Mud Hens, a team who was popular and liked enough to have some of their players, including Abbot be featured on tobacco baseball cards. Abbott would spend the next five years with Toledo primarily as a starter. His most notable season was 1908, in which he batted .331. In his final season as a player Abbott was starting for the Los Angeles Angels of the Pacific Coast League where he played in 110 games hitting .215 with a home run.

His interment was located at Valhalla Memorial Park Cemetery.
