= Hinckley House =

Hinckley House may refer to:

- Ward Hinckley House, Blue Hill, Maine
- Hinckley Homestead, Barnstable, Massachusetts
- Capt. Joseph Hinckley House, Barnstable, Massachusetts
- Nymphus Hinckley House, Barnstable, Massachusetts
- S. Alexander Hinckley House, Barnstable, Massachusetts
- Col. J. Hinckley House, Fenton, Michigan, listed on the National Register of Historic Places (NRHP)
