= Martha Nussbaum bibliography =

The following page is a list of works by the American philosopher Martha Nussbaum.

== Books ==
- Nussbaum, Martha; Aristotle (1985). Aristotle's De Motu Animalium: Text with Translation, Commentary, and Interpretive Essays. Princeton, NJ: Princeton University Press. ISBN 9780691020358.
- Nussbaum, Martha (2000). The Fragility of Goodness: Luck and Ethics in Greek Tragedy and Philosophy. Cambridge: Cambridge University Press. ISBN 9780521277020.
- Nussbaum, Martha (1990). Love's Knowledge: Essays on Philosophy and Literature. Oxford: Oxford University Press. ISBN 9780195074857.
- Nussbaum, Martha (1994). The Therapy of Desire: Theory and Practice in Hellenistic Ethics. Princeton University Press. ISBN 9780691033426.
- Nussbaum, Martha (1991). Poetic Justice: The Literary Imagination and Public Life. Boston: Beacon Press. ISBN 9780807041093.
- Nussbaum, Martha (1996). For Love of Country: Debating the Limits of Patriotism. Boston: Beacon Press. ISBN 9780807043134.
- Nussbaum, Martha (1997). Cultivating Humanity: A Classical Defense of Reform in Liberal Education. Cambridge, MA: Harvard University Press. ISBN 9780674179493.
- Nussbaum, Martha (1998). Plato's Republic: The Good Society and the Deformation of Desire. Washington D.C.: Library of Congress. ISBN 9780844409511.
- Nussbaum, Martha (2000). Sex & Social Justice. Oxford: Oxford University Press. ISBN 9780195112108.
- Nussbaum, Martha (2000). Women and Human Development: The Capabilities Approach. Cambridge: Cambridge University Press. ISBN 9780521003858.
- Nussbaum, Martha (2001). The Fragility of Goodness: Luck and Ethics in Greek Tragedy and Philosophy, Updated Edition (second ed.). Cambridge: Cambridge University Press. ISBN 9780511817915.
- Nussbaum, Martha (2001). Upheavals of Thought: The Intelligence of Emotions. Cambridge: Cambridge University Press. ISBN 9780521531825.
- Nussbaum, Martha (2004). Hiding from Humanity: Disgust, Shame, and the Law. Princeton: Princeton University Press. ISBN 9780691126258.
- Nussbaum, Martha (2006). Frontiers of Justice: Disability, Nationality, Species Membership. Cambridge, MA: Belknap Press. ISBN 9780674024106.
- Nussbaum, Martha (2007). The Clash Within: Democracy, Religious Violence, and India's Future. Cambridge, MA: Belknap Press. ISBN 9780674030596.
- Nussbaum, Martha (2008). Liberty of Conscience: In Defense of America's Tradition of Religious Equality. New York: Basic Books. ISBN 9780465018536.
- Nussbaum, Martha (2009). The Therapy of Desire: Theory and Practice in Hellenistic Ethics, with a new introduction by the author (second ed.). Woodstock Princeton, NJ: Princeton University Press. ISBN 9780691141312.
- Nussbaum, Martha (2010). From Disgust to Humanity: Sexual Orientation and Constitutional Law. Oxford: Oxford University Press. ISBN 9780195305319.
- Nussbaum, Martha (2010). Not for Profit: Why Democracy Needs the Humanities. Princeton, NJ: Princeton University Press. ISBN 9780691140643.
- Nussbaum, Martha (2011). Creating Capabilities: The Human Development Approach. Cambridge, MA: Belknap Press. ISBN 9780674050549.
- Nussbaum, Martha (2012). Philosophical Interventions: Book Reviews, 1986-2011. Oxford: Oxford University Press. ISBN 9780199777853.
- Nussbaum, Martha (2012). The New Religious Intolerance: Overcoming the Politics of Gear in an Anxious Age. Cambridge, MA: Belknap Press. ISBN 9780674725911.
- Nussbaum, Martha (2013). Political Emotions: Why Love Matters for Justice. Cambridge, MA: Belknap Press. ISBN 9780674724655.
- Nussbaum, Martha (2016). Anger and Forgiveness: Resentment, Generosity, Justice. Oxford: Oxford University Press. ISBN 9780199335879.
- Nussbaum, Martha; Levmore, Saul (2017). Aging Thoughtfully. Oxford: Oxford University Press. ISBN 978-0-19-060023-5. OCLC 980431879.
- Nussbaum, Martha (2018). The Monarchy of Fear: A Philosopher Looks at Our Political Crisis. Oxford: Oxford University Press. ISBN 978-0-19-883021-4..
- Nussbaum, Martha (2021). The Cosmopolitan Tradition. Cambridge, MA: Belknap Press. ISBN 978-0-674-26039-9.
- Nussbaum, Martha (2021). Citadels of Pride: Sexual Abuse, Accountability, and Reconciliation. New York: Norton. ISBN 978-1-324-02210-7.
- Nussbaum, Martha (2023). Justice for Animals: Our Collective Responsibility. New York: Simon & Schuster. ISBN 978-1-9821-0251-7.
- Nussbaum, Martha (2024). The Tenderness of Silent Minds: Benjamin Britten and his War Requiem. Oxford: Oxford University Press. ISBN 978-0-19-756853-8.
- Nussbaum, Martha (2026). The Republic of Love: Opera and Political Freedom. Oxford: Oxford University Press. ISBN 978-0-19-781255-6.

== Books edited ==
- Nussbaum, Martha; Schofield, Malcolm, eds. (1982). Language and Logos: Studies in Greek Philosophy in Honour of G. E. L. Owen. Cambridge University Press.
- Nussbaum, Martha, ed. (1986). Logic, Science, and Dialectic: Collected Papers in Greek Philosophy by G.E.L. Owen. Ithaca, NY: Duckworth and Cornell University Press.
- Nussbaum, Martha; Rorty, Amélie, eds. (1992). Essays on Aristotle's De Anima. Oxford: Clarendon Press.
- Nussbaum, Martha; Brunschwig, Jacques, eds. (1993). Passions & Perceptions: Studies in Hellenistic Philosophy of Mind. Cambridge: Cambridge University Press.
- Nussbaum, Martha; Sen, Amartya, eds. (1993). The Quality of Life. Oxford: Clarendon Press. ISBN 9780198287971.
- Nussbaum, Martha; Glover, Jonathan, eds. (1995). Women, Culture, and Development. Oxford: Clarendon Press.
- Nussbaum, Martha; Estlund, David, eds. (1997). Sex, Preference, and Family: Essays on Law and Nature. Oxford: Oxford University Press.
- Nussbaum, Martha; Olyan, Saul, eds. (1998). Sexual Orientation and Human Rights in American Religious Discourse. Oxford: Oxford University Press.
- Nussbaum, Martha; Sunstein, Cass, eds. (1998). Clones and Clones: Facts and Fantasies About Human Cloning. New York: Norton. ISBN 9780393320015.
- Nussbaum, Martha; Cohen, Joshua; Howard, Matthew, eds. (1999). Is Multiculturalism Good for Women?. Princeton, NJ: Princeton University Press. ISBN 9780691004327. Originally an essay (pdf).
- Nussbaum, Martha; Sihvola, Juha, eds. (2002). The Sleep of Reason: Erotic Experience and Sexual Ethics in Ancient Greece and Rome. Chicago: University of Chicago Press. ISBN 9780226609157.
- Nussbaum, Martha; Basu, Amriyta; Tambiah, Yasmin; Jayal, Naraja Gopal (2003). Essays on Gender and Governance (PDF). UN Human Development Resource Centre. OCLC 608384493.
- Nussbaum, Martha; Sunstein, Cass, eds. (2004). Animal Rights: Current Debates, New Directions. Oxford: Oxford University Press. ISBN 9780195305104.
- Nussbaum, Martha; Gleason, Abbott; Goldsmith, Jack, eds. (2005). On Nineteen Eighty-Four. Orwell and Our Future. Princeton, NJ: Princeton University Press.
- Nussbaum, Martha; Levmore, Saul, eds. (2010). The Offensive Internet: Speech, Privacy, and Reputation. Cambridge, MA: Harvard University Press.
- Nussbaum, Martha; Hasan, Zoya, eds. (2012). Equalizing Access: Affirmative Action in Higher Education in India, United States, and South Africa. Oxford: Oxford University Press.
- Nussbaum, Martha; LaCroix, Alison, eds. (2013). Subversion and Sympathy: Gender, Law, and the British Novel. Oxford: Oxford University Press.
- Nussbaum, Martha; Cormack, Bradin; Strier, Richard, eds. (2013). Shakespeare and the Law: A Conversation Among Disciplines and Professions. Chicago: University of Chicago Press.
- Nussbaum, Martha; Comim, Flavio, eds. (2014). Capabilities, Gender, Equality: Towards Fundamental Entitlements. Cambridge University Press.
- Nussbaum, Martha; Levmore, Saul, eds. (2014). American Guy: Masculinity in American Law and Literature. Oxford: Oxford University Press.
- Nussbaum, Martha; Doniger, Wendy, eds. (2015). Pluralism and Democracy in India: Debating the Hindu Right. Oxford: Oxford University Press.
- Nussbaum, Martha; Brooks, Thom, eds. (2015). Rawls's Political Liberalism. New York: Columbia University Press. ISBN 978-0231149709.
- Anderson, Scott; Nussbaum, Martha, eds. (2018). Confronting Torture: Essays on the Ethics, Legality, History, and Psychology of Torture Today. Chicago: University of Chicago Press. ISBN 978-0-226-52941-7.

== Articles, chapters and other contributions ==
- Nussbaum, Martha. (1992). The Professor of Parody: The Hip Defeatism of Judith Butler in The New Republic, 22: p. 37-45.
- Nussbaum, Martha. (1997). "Is Nietzsche a political thinker?" International Journal of Philosophical Studies 5 (1): 1-13. doi:10.1080/09672559708570842.
- Nussbaum, Martha (2004), "The future of feminist liberalism", in Baehr, Amy R. (ed.), Varieties of feminist liberalism, Lanham, Maryland Oxford: Rowman & Littlefield Publishers, ISBN 9780742512030.
- Nussbaum, Martha C. (2005), "Women and cultural universals", in Cudd, Ann E.; Andreasen, Robin O. (eds.), Feminist theory: a philosophical anthology, Oxford: Blackwell Publishing, pp. 302–324, ISBN 9781405116619.
- Nussbaum, Martha c. (2005), "Women's education: a global challenge", in Friedman, Marilyn (ed.), Women and citizenship, Studies in Feminist Philosophy, Oxford: Oxford University Press, pp. 188–214, ISBN 9780195175356.
- Nussbaum, Martha (2006), ""Whether from Reason or Prejudice": taking money for bodily services", in Spector, Jessica (ed.), Prostitution and pornography: philosophical debate about the sex industry, Stanford: Stanford University Press, pp. 175–208, ISBN 9780804749381.
- Nussbaum, Martha C. (Summer 2008). "Robin West, "Jurisprudence and Gender": defending a radical liberalism". University of Chicago Law Review. 75 (3). University of Chicago Law School: 985–996. JSTOR 20141934. Pdf.

See also: West, Robin (Winter 1988). "Jurisprudence and gender". University of Chicago Law Review. 55 (1): 1–72. doi:10.2307/1599769. JSTOR 1599769. Pdf.

- Nussbaum, Martha C. (2009), "The clash within: democracy and the Hindu right", in Kanbur, Ravi; Basu, Kaushik (eds.), Arguments for a better world: essays in honor of Amartya Sen | Volume II: Society, institutions and development, Oxford: Oxford University Press, pp. 503–521, ISBN 9780199239979.
- Nussbaum, Martha C. (2015). "Transitional Anger." Journal of the American Philosophical Association 1 (1): 41-56. https://doi.org/10.1017/apa.2014.19.
- Nussbaum, Martha. (2017). "Sex, Love and the Aging Woman". NYTimes, 2017.
