= Abbott House =

Abbott House may refer to:

== Places ==
- Robert S. Abbott House, Chicago, Illinois
- Abbott–Holloway Farm, Bethlehem, Indiana
- Jacob Abbott House, Farmington, Maine, in Franklin County
- Abbott Graves House, Kennebunkport, Maine, in York County
- Ezra Abbott House, Owatonna, Minnesota, in Steele County, Minnesota
- John Abbott II House, Trenton, New Jersey, in Mercer County
- Abbott–Decou House, Trenton, New Jersey, in Mercer County
- Abbott House (childcare agency), an orphanage in Irvington, New York
- William Riley Abbott House, South Mills, North Carolina
- Abbott–Page House, Milan, Ohio
- John Abbott House, Abbottstown, Pennsylvania

== See also ==
- George S. Abbott Building, Waterbury, Connecticut
- Abbot House (disambiguation)
