= Abbott =

Abbott may refer to:

== People ==
- Abbott (surname)
- Abbott (given name), a list of people named Abbott or Abbot

== Places ==
=== Argentina ===
- Abbott, Buenos Aires

=== United States ===
- Abbott, Arkansas
- Abbott, Mississippi
- Abbott, Nebraska
- Abbott, Texas
- Abbott, Virginia
- Abbott, West Virginia
- Abbott Township, Pennsylvania

== Companies ==
- Abbott Laboratories, an American health care and medical devices company
- Abbott Records, a former American record label
- E. D. Abbott Ltd, an English maker of car bodies between 1929 and 1972

== Other uses ==
- Abbott 33, a Canadian sailboat design
- Abbott House (childcare agency), an American human services agency
- Abbott Elementary, an American mockumentary sitcom television series

== See also ==
- Abbott-Detroit, an American luxury automobile
- Abbott's Get Together, a magic convention held in Michigan
- Abbot (disambiguation)
