= Abbot (disambiguation) =

An abbot is the head of a monastery; the term is usually used in a Christian context but is used sometimes in a Buddhist context: Abbot (Buddhism).

Abbot may also refer to:

== People ==
- Abbot (surname), a list of people
- Abbot (given name), a list of people
- "The Abbot," a pseudonym of Rza, an American rapper

== Places ==
- Abbot, Maine, US, a town
- Mount Abbot, California, US
- Abbot Pass (Clackamas County, Oregon), US, a mountain pass
- Abbot Pass, a mountain pass on the border between Alberta and British Columbia, Canada
- Abbot (crater), a lunar impact crater

== Military ==
- Abbot (artillery), a self-propelled gun
- USS Abbot, two US Navy destroyers
- Camp Abbot, a former military training center in Oregon, US

== Other uses ==
- Abbot, a GWR Waverley Class 4-4-0 broad gauge steam locomotive
- Leon Abbot (Artemis Fowl), a fictional character
- The Abbot, a novel by Sir Walter Scott
- Abbot Group, an oil and gas services company

== See also ==
- Abbot House (disambiguation)
- Abbot Primate, the elected representative for Benedictines monks of the Benedictine Confederation of monasteries
- Hugh the Abbot (died 886), abbot and Archbishop of Cologne in the Carolingian Empire
- Abbots Creek, a tributary of Back Creek in New Jersey
- Abbot's Hospital, a Grade I listed Jacobean building and charity in Guildford, England
- Abbott (disambiguation)
