= Abbatt =

Abbatt is a surname. Notable people with the surname include:

- Agnes Dean Abbatt (1847–1917), American artist
- Jonathan Abbatt, Canadian chemist
- Marjorie Abbatt (1899–1991), English toy-maker and businesswoman

== See also ==
- Abbott (disambiguation)
