= Abbott (given name) =

Abbott, also spelled Abbot, is a masculine given name which may refer to:

- Abbott Hall Brisbane (1804–1861), American novelist
- Abbott Lowell Cummings (1923–2017), American historian and genealogist
- Abbott Fuller Graves (1859–1936), American painter and illustrator
- Abbott Gleason (1938–2015), American professor
- Abbot Howard Hoffman (1936–1989), better known as Abbie Hoffman, American social and political activist
- Abbott Kahler (born 1973), American author of historical nonfiction
- Abbot Kinney (1850–1920), American developer and conservationist
- Abbott Eliot Kittredge (1834–1912), American leader of the Presbyterian Church
- Abbott Lawrence (1792–1855), American industrialist and politician
- A. J. Liebling (1904–1963), American journalist
- Abbot Augustus Low (1844–1912), American entrepreneur and inventor
- A. Lawrence Lowell (1856–1943), American educator and legal scholar
- J. Abbott Miller (born 1962), American graphic designer and writer
- Abbot Mills (1898–1986), American economist
- Abbot Low Moffat (1901–1996), American lawyer, politician and diplomat
- Abbott Pattison (1916–1999), American sculptor and abstract artist
- Abbott Lawrence Rotch (1861–1912), American meteorologist
- Abbott Barnes Rice (1862–1926), American politician
- Abbott Handerson Thayer (1849–1921), American painter and naturalist
- Abbott Payson Usher (1883–1965), American economic historian
- Abbott M. Washburn (1915–2003), American administrator
