= Col. J. Hinckley House =

- U.S. National Register of Historic Places
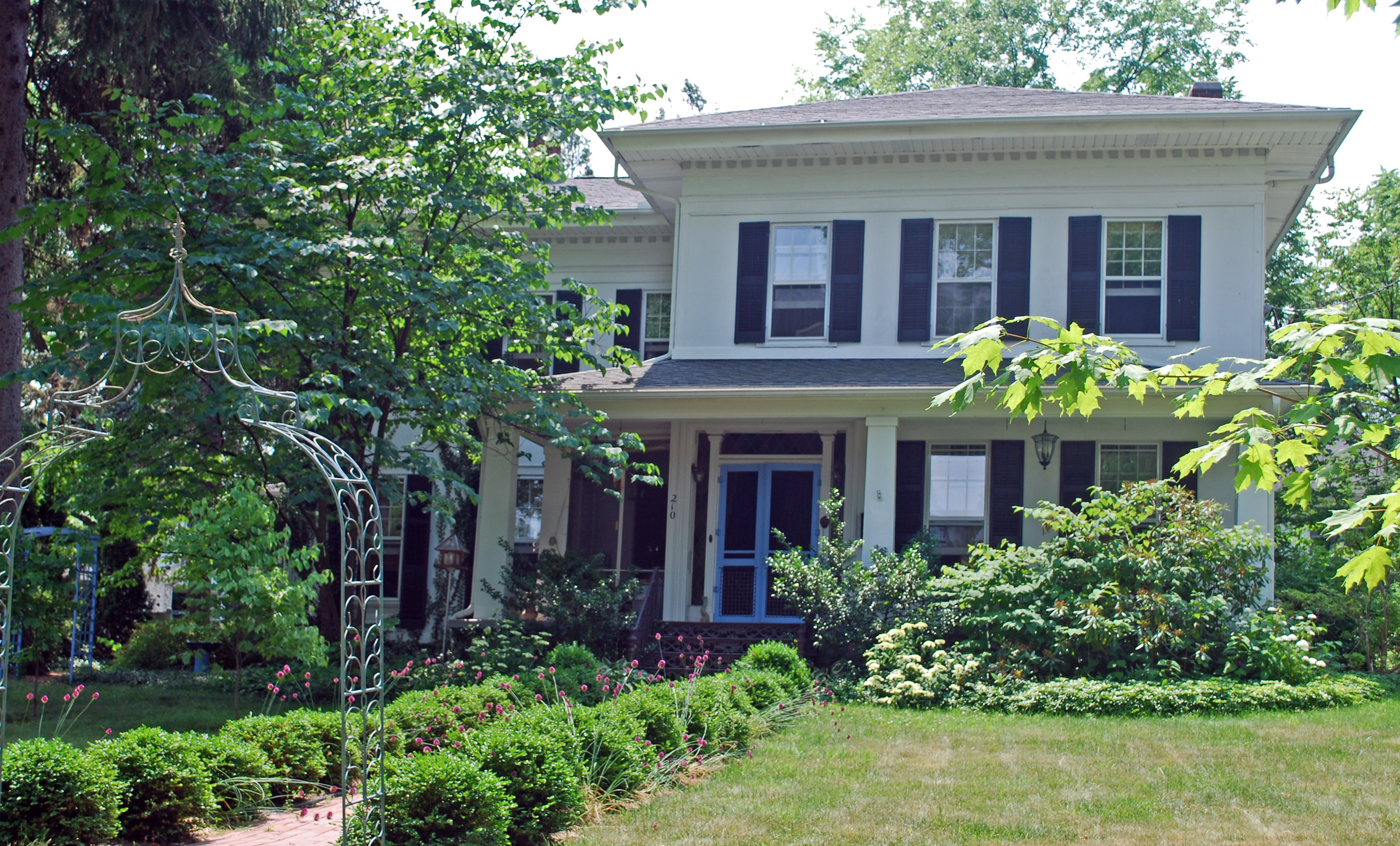
- Interactive map
- Location: 210 High St., Fenton, Michigan
- Coordinates: 42°47′16″N 83°42′11″W
- Area: less than one acre
- Built: 1868
- Architectural style: Italianate
- MPS: Genesee County MRA
- NRHP reference No.: 82000512
- Added to NRHP: November 26, 1982

The Col. J. Hinckley House is a single-family home located at 210 High Street in Fenton, Michigan. It was listed on the National Register of Historic Places in 1982.

== History ==
This house was built in 1868 by Colonel J. Hinckley. Little else is known about Col. Hinckley, but the house was later occupied by a string of Fentonville's most prominent businessmen. These included nineteenth century industrialist, A. J. Phillips, dry goods merchant Brent Birdsall, First National Bank of Fentonville founder David Latourette (who endowed the prestigious Fenton Seminary), and, in the 1920s, Aetna Cement Company president Earl Bunce.

== Description ==
The Col. J. Hinckley House has an Italianate massing, with two square sections with wide overhanging hip roofs, fitted together in an L-shaped configuration. However, the house lacks the typical Italianate ornamentation; indeed, other than a frieze with dentils located below the roofline, no particular detailing exist on the exterior. The lack of ornamentation highlights the home's interesting exterior finish in stucco, applied by Bunce to the facades of his brick home.
