= Creating Capabilities =

2011 book by Martha Nussbaum

Creating Capabilities is a nonfiction book by philosopher Martha Nussbaum published in 2011, which outlines a unique theory regarding the Capability approach or the Human development approach. Nussbaum draws on theories of other notable advocates of the Capability approach like Amartya Sen, but makes specific distinctions. One distinct idea she proposes is to choose a list of capabilities based on some aspects of John Rawls' concept of "central human capabilities." These ten capabilities encompass everything Nussbaum considers essential to living a life that one values. Martha Nussbaum and Amartya Sen are considered to be the main scholars of this approach, but have distinctions in their approach to capabilities. Sen disagrees with Nussbaum's list of values on the grounds that it does not fully encompass the range of capabilities one would consider to live a fulfilling life, which inherently differs by person.

Nussbaum's book combines ideas from the Capability approach, development economics, and distributive justice to substantiate a qualitative theory on capabilities. She criticizes existing economic indicators like GDP as failing to fully account for quality of life and assurance of basic needs, instead rewarding countries with large growth distributed highly unequally across the population. The book also aims to serve as an introduction to the Capability approach more generally, accessible to students and newcomers to the material because of the current lack of general knowledge about this approach. Finally, Nussbaum compares her approach with other popular approaches to human development and economic welfare, including Utilitarianism, Rawlsian Justice, and Welfarism in order to argue why the Capability approach should be prioritized by development economics policymakers.

== Context ==
Nussbaum has a background in philosophy, having earned a doctorate in Classical philology from Harvard University in 1975. With ethics and foundational principles in mind, she first challenged notions of what it means to live the "good life" in her book The Fragility of Goodness: Luck and Ethics in Greek Tragedy and Philosophy. She then extended this thought process in 1999 with a series of essays to advocate a basic version of the capability approach specific to women.

Scholars view the Capability approach as being founded by Sen and Nussbaum after they were unsatisfied with other measures of quality of life and human development. This criticism eventually evolved into a comprehensive political philosophy framework to evaluate public policy.

Sen began discussion of the capabilities approach through multiple articles published in the late 1900s. Most notably, his essay "Equality of What" moved the focus from access to resources to analysing how effectively people can use those resources for their well-being.

The Quality of Life, co-authored by Nussbaum and Sen, advanced the literature to propose the first outline of Capability approach in its entirety. The collection of articles emphasizes the importance of quality of life as an economic indicator and the insufficiency of current methods to measure it. Sen and Nussbaum offer a preliminary definition of capabilities as the "various alternative combinations of functionings, any one of which (any combination, that is) the person can choose to have...the freedom that a person has to lead one kind of life or another." In addition, they highlight the importance of critically analysing the tools we use to measure and assess quality of life, and the relevance of this discussion to the greater policy-making community.

Nussbaum started approaching her version of the Capability approach through drawing from philosophers Aristotle, Karl Marx, and John Stuart Mill. One of her first major contributions to the Capability approach literature came in 2000 in the form of Women and Human Development: The Capabilities Approach, where her proposed model of feminism and partial theory of justice intersects with her idea of human capabilities: "what people are actually capable of doing or becoming in the real world."

Nussbaum went on to substantiate her research in capabilities. However, she viewed the discourse on the Capabilities approach as restrictive, "expounded primarily in dense articles and books for specialists." She aims to fill the gap in general understanding of the approach, and argue for the power of the Capabilities approach to enable policy-makers to create meaningful change in human lives in Creating Capabilities.

== Main ideas ==
=== Ten central capabilities ===
A tenet of Nussbaum's approach is her definition of the central human capabilities, which she first laid out in 2000. These include:

1. Life: ability to live to the end of one's live in a natural manner (not dying prematurely or before life is significantly reduced in capabilities).
2. Bodily health: good physical and reproductive health, as well as access to satisfactory nutrition and shelter.
3. Bodily integrity: the ability to travel from place to place without restriction and without fear of violent assault (sexual assault, domestic violence); ability to choose in situations involving reproduction and sexual activities.
4. Senses, imagination, and thought: ability to use one's sense to "imagine, think, and reason" in a "truly human" way. Being adequately informed by education, literacy, basic mathematical and scientific knowledge; ability to apply imagination and thought to one's own interests, safeguarded by freedom of expression and freedom of religion.
5. Emotions: the capability to attach oneself to external people and things; to "love those who love and care for us, to grieve at their absence," to want relationships, be grateful for them, and experience different sentiments including sadness and anger; being able to feel emotions without constant fear and anxiety.
6. Practical reason: the ability to distinguish good from bad, and "engage in critical reflection" about one's life.
7. Affiliation: being capable of a variety of social interaction including living with others, feeling concern for others, the ability to be empathetic; being able to feel self-respect and dignity and ability to be treated with dignity by others (nondiscrimination).
8. Other species: the ability to live in harmony and context with nature and one's external environment.
9. Play: the capability of laughter and joy through recreational activities, although not limited to them.
10. Control over one's environment: being able to affect political institutions through political choice, including political participation, free speech, and political organization; having the power to possess property and hold equal property rights as others with differing identities; having equal opportunities to find work (and in that workspace, the capability of being treated as a human being with dignity and the ability to form significant relationships), being free from "unwarranted search and seizure."

Nussbaum further justifies these capabilities in her book, citing examples like the empirical work of Jonathan Wolff and Avner De-Shalit that supported her capabilities being the "most salient" in analyzed areas.

=== Description ===
Nussbaum begins Creating Capabilities by describing the disconnect between leaders of countries, that focus on economic growth, and citizens, who value achieving a meaningful life. Contrary to public belief, there is not a causal relationship between GDP and quality of life. She uses the example of Vasanti, a Gujarati woman who suffered multiple personal and economic misfortunes under a state primarily focused on economic growth. She was able to regain her financial independence and achieve greater success in education, activism, and pursuing a meaningful life because of SEWA, an NGO. Nussbaum analyzes this situation through a humanist perspective, emphasizing the role of gender discrimination, gender discrimination in education, nutritional deficiency, unequal property and inheritance laws, religion-based discrimination, domestic violence, the caste system, and political inequities all affecting Vasanti's outcomes; ultimately, GDP per capita and foreign investment do not directly affect these people in the absence of redistributive policies.

Nussbaum then starts defining the capabilities approach as a theory that asks the question "what is each person able to do and be," shifting focus from aggregate measures of well-being to a focus on individual freedom and opportunity. Capabilities consist of "substantial freedoms", opportunities to "choose and to act", also known as combined capabilities; they represent the substantive freedom "to achieve alternative functioning combinations". She also makes a distinction between the "Human Development" and "Capabilities Approach", as she is "concerned with the capabilities of nonhuman animals as well as human beings." This approach is inherently pluralist because capabilities are different based on the individual, and cannot be fully captured through quantifiers. Nussbaum also defines capability failures as "entrenched social injustice and inequality" that is the result of "discrimination or marginalization". Nussbaum views the Capabilities approach as having two purposes, the first of which she ascribes to: to construct "a theory of basic social justice," adding notions of "human dignity, the threshold, political liberalism" to create a more philosophical argument. However, her approach does not include methods to analyze quality of life in a society overall. The second purpose, one she purports that Sen advocates, emphasizes quality of life as a way to compare development in different countries.

Subsequently, Nussbaum outlines Sen and collaborators' Capability approach in detail. She then delves into further depth on the theory of social justice she advocates through the Capacities approach, and specific questions in the capability literature that are most pertinent to her field, including cultural diversity, universality, global poverty and injustice, the history of the capabilities approach, inequality, disabilities, aging, care, education, animal rights, environmental rights, and constitutionality.

== Reception ==
=== Scholarly criticism ===
==== Amartya Sen ====
Main page: Capability approach

==== Ingrid Robeyns ====
In her paper, "Sen's Capability Approach and Gender Inequality: Selecting Relevant Capabilities," Robeyns argues against adopting a definitive list of capabilities at all, instead proposing a procedure by which one could select capabilities based on five criteria: . She then applies these criteria specifically to gender inequality in the United States. Robeyns credits the capability approach for identifying the power of functionings and capabilities with individuals, being accessible in market and nonmarket environments, and being more inclusive than other dominant theories. However, she worries that the "capability approach is vulnerable to androcentric interpretations and applications," and that Nussbaum's list may lack both "the political legitimacy needed for policy design" and "academic legitimacy."

Robeyns furthers her argument against Nussbaum's definitive list in her article "Selecting Capabilities for Quality of Life Measurement." She disagrees with Nussbaum's theory because 1: the capability approach "is used for different epistemological goals" that may require a different set of capabilities, 2: one (referring to Nussbaum) cannot truly understand all cross-cultural needs in a comprehensive list of universal capabilities, and 3: Robeyns doubts the legitimacy behind Nussbaum's method of selecting the ten capabilities because it does not take "the process that led to the outcome into account."

In "Critiques and Debates," Robeys offers additional arguments against some of Nussbaum's claims, including the belief that the capabilities approach necessitates government action "as the only, or primary, agent of justice." She also disagrees with Nussbaum's inclusion of non-human beings in the capabilities approach, and therefore finds that not a "valid reason to make the distinction between ‘the human development approach’, and ‘the capability approach."

==== Other criticism ====
1. Thomas Pogge
2. Alison Jaggar
3. "Nussbaum’s Capabilities Approach: In Need of a Moral Epistemology?"
4. “Reasoning About Well-Being: Nussbaum’s Methods of Justifying the Capabilities.”
5. "Martha Nussbaum's Capabilities Approach: Perils and Promises"
6. “Capabilities for All? From Capabilities to Function, to Capabilities to Control.”

=== In the news ===
Creating Capabilities has been reviewed by media outlets from The Boston Globe to Publishers Weekly. Amartya Sen applauds Nussbaum for "A remarkably lucid and scintillating account of the human development approach seen from the perspective of one of its major architects." Professors have reacted to Nussbaum's work:

The very best way to be introduced to the capability approach to international development. It is also a wonderfully lucid account of the origins, justification, structure, and practical implications of her version of this powerful approach to ethically-based change in poor and rich countries.

— David Alan Crocker, University of Maryland School of Public Policy

Nussbaum, who has done more than anyone to develop the authoritative and ground-breaking capabilities approach, offers a major restatement that will be required reading for all those interested in economic development that truly enhances how people live.

— Henry Richardson, Georgetown University

A marvelous achievement: beautifully written and accessible. With Amartya Sen, Martha Nussbaum is one of the founders of the 'capability approach' to justice; the most innovative and influential development in political philosophy since the work of John Rawls. This book, for the first time, puts in one place all the central elements of Nussbaum's systematic account of the approach, together with its sources and implications.

— Jonathan Wolff, University College London

== Impact ==
Although not directly because of this book specifically, Nussbaum's work on the Capability approach has played a significant role in the United Nations Development Project developing the Human Development Index. The Human Development Index focuses on three dimensions, a health, education, and standard of living dimension, and calculates an aggregate measure of these indexes along with other factors like Gross National Income, general income, and Gross Domestic Product to create an overall quantitative, comparable measure of human development between countries. This identification of dimensions of human development, along with the general conception of a more holistic measure to evaluate global progress, was directly impacted by the Capability approach. Nussbaum's ten central capabilities are reflected in the HDI's different dimensions. The Human Development Index (HDI) was created to build on the insights founded by Nussbaum and Sen through the humanist revolution, "in effect developing an applied measure of social welfare as a correlate to this new theoretical welfare economics. Just as income per capita and CBA were the progeny of the ordinalist revolution, HDI was born of the humanist revolution."

Nussbaum herself has long advocated integrating nontraditional perspectives in higher education (Cultivating Humanity: A Classical Defense of Reform in Liberal Education (1997)). This train of thought can be applied to the Capability approach, but is not currently integrated into the literature. However, Nussbaum has opened the dialogue on this subject with regard to people with disabilities, and differences in capability and capability prioritization across race, ethnic, gender, and cultural identities. Krushil Watene, a doctoral advisor in the School of Humanities at Massey University in the University of New Zealand, has expanded this literature by discussing at length the relationship between the Capability approach and indigenous peoples. Professor Michael Litschka at St. Pölten University of Applied Sciences has extended capabilities to include media capabilities. Creating Capabilities and Nussbaum's approach has recently been linked to housing policy, the health field, knowledge of the Capability approach and instruments to evaluate public health policy Nussbaum has also discussed the relationship between the Capability approach and the disabled, and the extension of the Capability approach to these groups is an active area of research.

== Related works ==
=== By Nussbaum ===
1. "Capabilities and Social Justice"
2. "From Cosmopolitanism to The Capabilities Approach"
3. "Capabilities as Fundamental Entitlements: Sen and Social Justice"
4. "Non-Relative Virtues: An Aristotelian Approach"

=== By other authors ===
1. Development as Freedom by Amartya Sen
2. Why Nations Fail by Daron Acemoglu and James A. Robinson
3. "An Introduction to the Human Development and Capability Approach," edited by Séverine Deneulin with Lila Shahani
4. "Wellbeing, Freedom and Social Justice: The Capability Approach Re-Examined" by Ingrid Robeyns
5. "Development as Capability Expansion" by Amartya Sen
6. "Inequality Reexamined" by Amartya Sen
7. "Advancing Human Development: Theory and Practice" by Frances Stewart

== See also ==
- International development
- Basic needs
