= Love's Knowledge =

1990 nonfiction book by M.C. Nussbaum

Love's Knowledge: Essays on Philosophy and Literature
- 1990 Book jacket
- Author: Martha C. Nussbaum
- Language: English
- Subject: Ethics, Literature, Social critique
- Set in: Europe
- Published: 1990
- Publisher: Oxford University Press
- Publication place: United States
- Media type: Print, eBook
- Pages: 432
- ISBN: 9780195054576 9780195074857
- OCLC: 20354452
- Website: Official website

Love's Knowledge: Essays on Philosophy and Literature is a nonfiction book written by Martha C. Nussbaum. It was originally published by Oxford University Press in 1990 with a paperback version released in 1992.

== Synopsis ==
This book consists of fourteen essays by Martha Nussbaum who looks at the relationship between philosophy and literature. The Introductory chapter gives an overview of her assertions. The essays consist of analyses of authors such as Henry James, Marcel Proust, and Friedrich Nietzsche, as well as comparisons between Plato and Aristotle. A main focus of the book is how literature and philosophy interrelate. According to her, fictional literary narratives perform a philosophical role that has more impact than discursive philosophy.

== Reception ==
Jenny Teichman reviewed the book and commented that the claims in the book are "overarching" comparing the book to "snake oil". Abdelkader Aoudjit praises her ideas about moral decisions but also argues that she "assumes that there is only one correct way of reading literary works".
