= Abbott Graves House =

Historic house in Maine, United States

- U.S. National Register of Historic Places
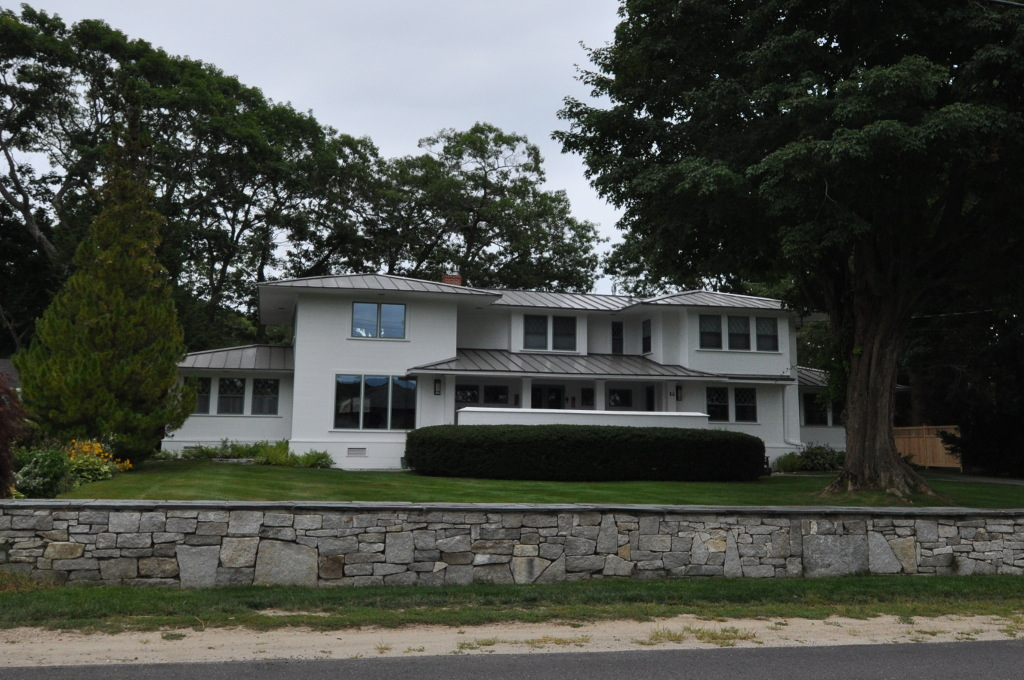
- Abbott Graves House

- Location within Maine Location within the United States
- Location: Ocean Ave., Kennebunkport, Maine
- Coordinates: 43°21′14″N 70°28′22″W
- Area: 0.5 acres (0.20 ha)
- Built: 1905
- Architect: Graves, Abbott
- Architectural style: Prairie School
- NRHP reference No.: 80000261
- Added to NRHP: April 23, 1980

The Abbott Graves House is a historic house at 86 Ocean Avenue in Kennebunkport, Maine. Built in 1905 by Abbott Fuller Graves to his own design, it is one of only two known examples of the Prairie School of architecture in the state of Maine. It was listed on the National Register of Historic Places in 1980.

== Description and history ==
The Graves House is set on the east side of Ocean Avenue at number 86, south of the village center of Kennebunkport and facing west toward the Kennebunk River. It is a two-story wood-frame structure with a broad shallow-pitch hipped roof, and a white stucco finish. It has a central section flanked by projecting sections, with a single-story shed-roof porch extending between and slightly forward of the projecting sections. Single-story wings project to the north and south. The symmetry of the building is deliberately disrupted by differing window arrangements in the projecting sections: one has three windows above two, the other two above three.

The house was built in 1905 to a design by the artist Abbott Fuller Graves, who had summered in Kennebunkport since 1891, and built this as a permanent year-round residence. Graves was clearly influenced by the work of Frank Lloyd Wright, whose first Prairie-style house was built in Kankakee, Illinois just five years earlier. This house remained Graves' home until his death in 1936. It is one of two Prairie-style houses in the state; the other is the Ward Hinckley House (also listed on the National Register) in Blue Hill.

== See also ==
- National Register of Historic Places listings in York County, Maine
