= Willits House =

Historic house in Highland Park, Illinois

- Ward W. Willits House
- U.S. National Register of Historic Places
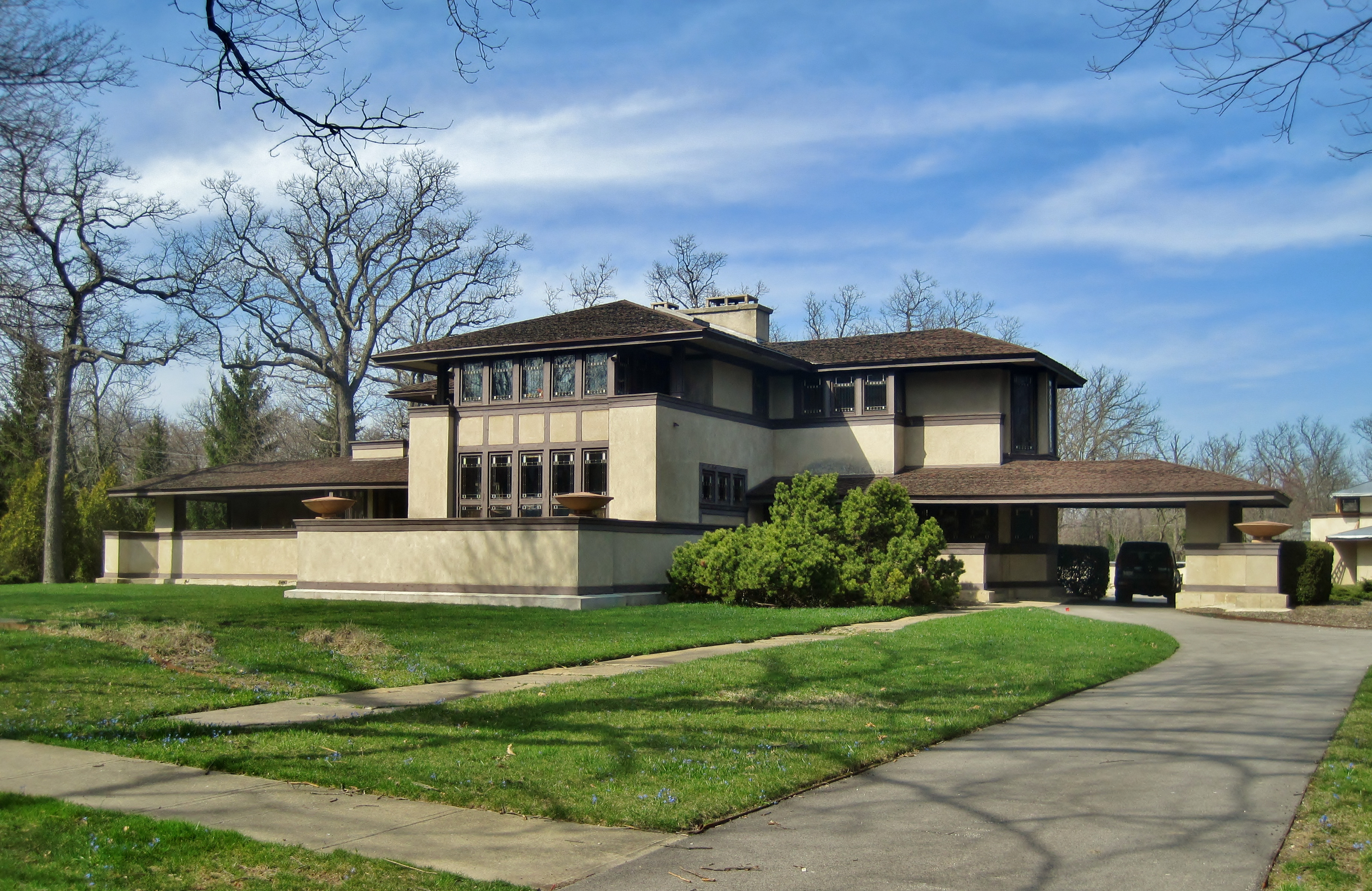
- Exterior view of Ward Willits House

- Location within Chicago metropolitan area
- Location: Highland Park, Illinois
- Coordinates: 42°10′44″N 87°47′13″W
- Architect: Frank Lloyd Wright
- Architectural style: Prairie School
- NRHP reference No.: 80001380
- Added to NRHP: November 24, 1980

The Ward W. Willits House is a historic house at 1445 Sheridan Road in Highland Park, a suburb of Chicago in Illinois, United States. Designed in 1901 by architect Frank Lloyd Wright, the Willits house is considered one of the first of the great Prairie School houses. The building presents a symmetrical facade to the street and has a cruciform plan, with four wings extending out from a central fireplace. In addition to stained-glass windows and wooden screens that divide rooms, Wright also designed the furniture for the house.

== Background ==
The Willits House is one of Wright's first true Prairie-style houses; as such, it is the culmination of the period of experimentation that Wright engaged in the previous few years. This house was designed for Ward Winfield Willits in 1901, who was then vice-president of Adams and Westlake Company, a brass foundry of which he was later made president. Orlando Giannini, who was employed by Willits at the time, may have been responsible for the creation of this house as he introduced Wright to Willits. Wright was known for bridging the gap between architecture and nature, which makes this house fascinating because it is a full expression of Wright's interest in reconnecting with nature and Wright's equal interest in Japanese architecture and the Secession art movement that was simultaneously occurring.

== Design ==
The construction of the Willits House marked the full development of Wright's wood frame and stucco system of construction. Although the Willits House has two stories, it is a more complex shape, consisting of a rectangular central space with a rectangular wing projecting from each side of that space. This is a standard design feature for most prairie-style houses, in addition to low roofs, elements that run parallel to the ground and extend out beyond the frame of the house. Wright used a cruciform plan with the interior space flowing around a central chimney core and extending outward onto covered verandas and open terraces. The plan of the house is a windmill style, as seen with the four wings extending from the fireplace in the central core and the movement from each wing being along a diagonal line. Wing two contains the great living room with high windows and a walled terrace. The dining room, extended by a large porch, comprises the third wing; the fourth, towards the rear of the house, contains the kitchen and servants' quarters. Wright incorporates diagonals into several other places in his design – the dining room has a prow-shaped end bay and another prow-shaped projection, the reception room has a similar prow-shaped bay, the art glass light over the entry stairway is rotated 45 degrees, again emphasizing the diagonal, and the terminating piers of the porte cochere are offset from the end wall by 45 degrees.

The first floor contains the living room that faces the street, the dining room, kitchen, pantry, servants' quarters, reception, porte cochere, veranda, and terrace. The first floor also contains several fireplaces that are clustered together. An entrance-stair hall, living room, dining room and kitchen rotate around the central fireplace. The plan of the house begins to open up and the rooms are linking much more strongly outward. The house is less contained and architecture that moved outwards was one of the main features. Moving to the second floor of the house, it contains five bedrooms, a sewing room and a library over the south entrance. Instead of continuing the west bedroom (directly over the living room) the full width of the wing, Wright left space for second-floor side porches and urns .

The Willits House was seen as an entertainment-style home. The use of the Romanesque archway in the entrance, an emphasis on horizontals as seen in the low roofs of the dining room wing and porte cochere and the use of different trim materials in the upper part of the house. When light shines on this area, the roof appears to be hovering and displays very deep and dark shadows. Another unique feature of this house is that Wright was able to design everything in the house, from the furniture to the lighting fixtures.

== Architect-client relationship ==
Wright and the Willits's became friends soon after meeting and realizing that with Wright's architectural expertise and Willits's company making contributions to many architectural projects, a vision for the Ward Willits House was possible. The client and architect continued their relationship after the house was completed, and Willits and his wife accompanied Frank Lloyd Wright and his first wife, Catherine (Tobin) Wright, on a trip to Japan in 1905. The trip went well and was a first for Wright; however, the relationship could not withstand the hardships that occur by being an architect and having a strong relationship with one's client. The clients were wealthy and had enough money to have the house built—although their friendship barely survived the ill treatment of Wright's first wife and family and unpaid loans Wright is said to have had with Willits, eventually repaid with sales of some of the many Japanese prints acquired on the trip. Nonetheless, Ward Willits spent many years with his wife in the house and lived there until his death in 1950.

== Post-1954 ==
The house was purchased in 1983 and the new owner began renovations. The new owner and his wife mainly completed the work, focusing on returning the building its original 1909 setting, and made sure to maintain Wright's unique features throughout the house. The restoration was acknowledged by many to be Museum quality, and received a Driehaus award. The house still sits on the same site in Highland Park, Illinois and is a common attraction for those who want to view a piece of architectural history. The Frank Lloyd Wright "Tour of the North Shore" currently explores the northern suburbs of Chicago along Lake Michigan to see one dozen Frank Lloyd Wright houses, including the Ward Willits House.

== See also ==
- List of Frank Lloyd Wright works
- Ward Hinckley House, a Maine house (not designed by Wright) based on this one
- National Register of Historic Places listings in Lake County, Illinois
