= Abbott, Arkansas =

- Unincorporated community
- Location within Arkansas Location within the United States
- Coordinates: 35°04′24″N 94°11′38″W
- Country: United States
- State: Arkansas
- County: Scott
- Elevation: 623 ft (190 m)
- Time zone: UTC-6 (Central (CST))
  - Summer (DST): UTC-5 (CDT)
- Area code: 479
- GNIS feature ID: 70403

Abbott is an unincorporated community in Scott County, Arkansas, United States.

== History ==
Abbott was founded in 1899, and was named after the local Abbott family.
