= John Abbott II House =

- U.S. National Register of Historic Places
- New Jersey Register of Historic Places
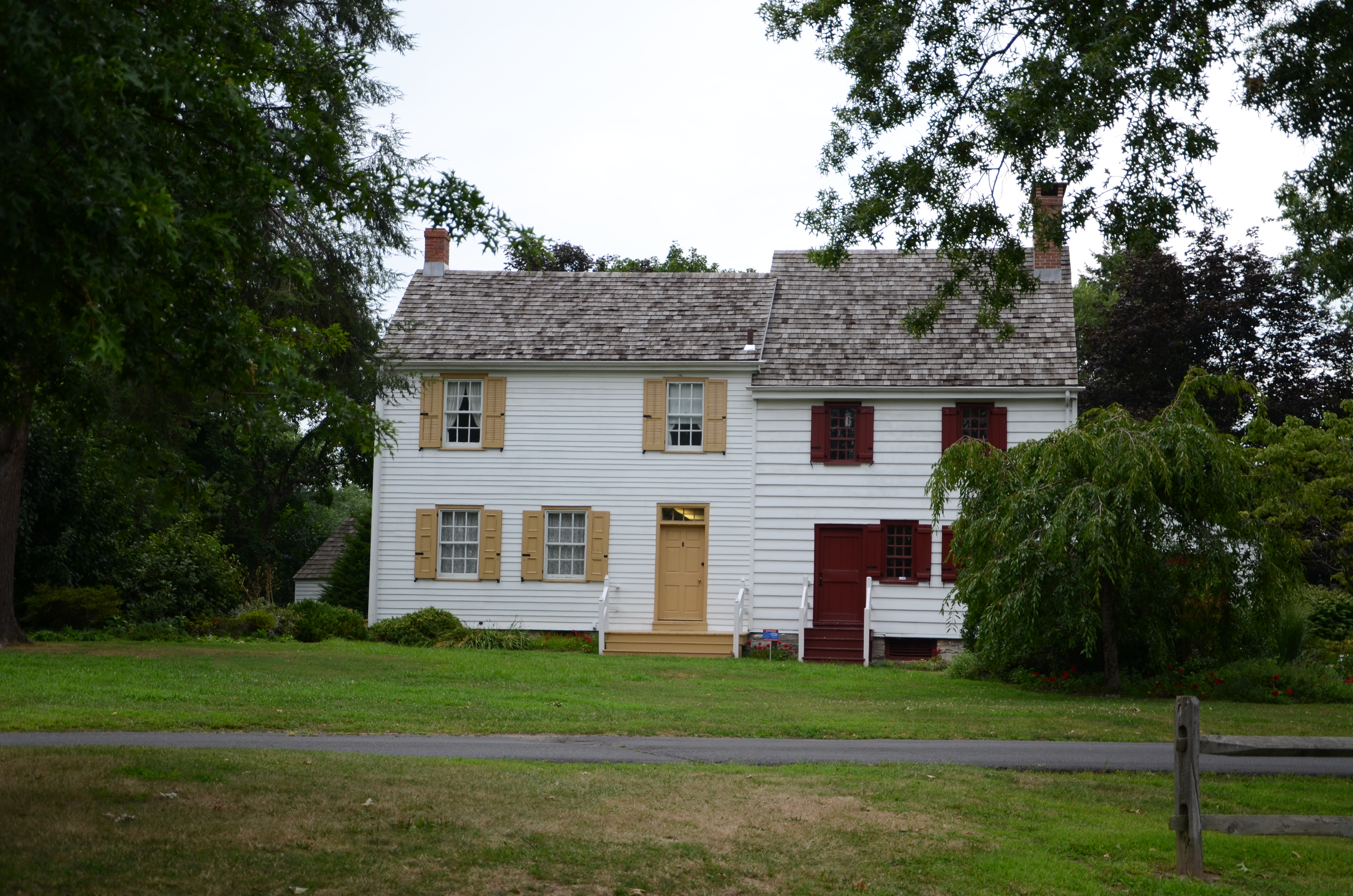

- Location within Mercer County, New Jersey Location within New Jersey Location within the United States
- Location: 2200 Kuser Road, Hamilton Township, Mercer County, New Jersey
- Coordinates: 40°12′14.0″N 74°40′50.3″W
- Built: c. 1730
- NRHP reference No.: 76001159
- NJRHP No.: 1652

Significant dates
- Added to NRHP: June 18, 1976
- Designated NJRHP: November 20, 1975

The John Abbott II House is located at 2200 Kuser Road in Hamilton Township of Mercer County, New Jersey. It was built c. 1730. The house is currently used as a museum by the Historical Society of Hamilton Township and is open to the public. It was added to the National Register of Historic Places on June 18, 1976, for its significance in architecture, military history, and politics/government.

== History and description ==
During the American Revolution, Samuel Tucker, the state treasurer, fleeing the British advance on Trenton, removed the money in his care to the home of John Abbott II. The location of the funds was betrayed by Mrs. Mary Pointing, who led a 500-strong detachment of British troops to the house. In ransacking the home, the soldiers discovered Tucker's trunk with his personal effects and £1500 in unsigned paper money. However, the specie money was hidden by the family in the bottom of tubs in the cellar, covered with broken dishes and household utensils. The tubs escaped close inspection and the money was kept from British hands.

== See also ==
- National Register of Historic Places listings in Mercer County, New Jersey
- List of the oldest buildings in New Jersey
