= The Fragility of Goodness =

1986 book by Martha Nussbaum

The Fragility of Goodness: Luck and Ethics in Greek Tragedy and Philosophy
- Author: Martha Nussbaum
- Language: English
- Genre: Philosophy
- Publisher: Cambridge University Press
- Publication date: 1986
- Pages: 544
- ISBN: 9780521794725

The Fragility of Goodness is a 1986 philosophical book by Martha Nussbaum, which deals with philosophical topics such as what flourishing consists of for human beings by seeking the dialogue with ancient philosophers, such as Aristotle, to whom Nussbaum pays much attention in many of her other works as well. The work covers the views of Plato, Aristotle, and Ancient Greek tragedians, such as Sophocles.

== Reviews ==
Patrick O'Sullivan (2002), Bryn Mawr Classical Review.

== See also ==
- Ethics
