= Abbott–Page House =

Historic house in Ohio, United States

- U.S. National Register of Historic Places
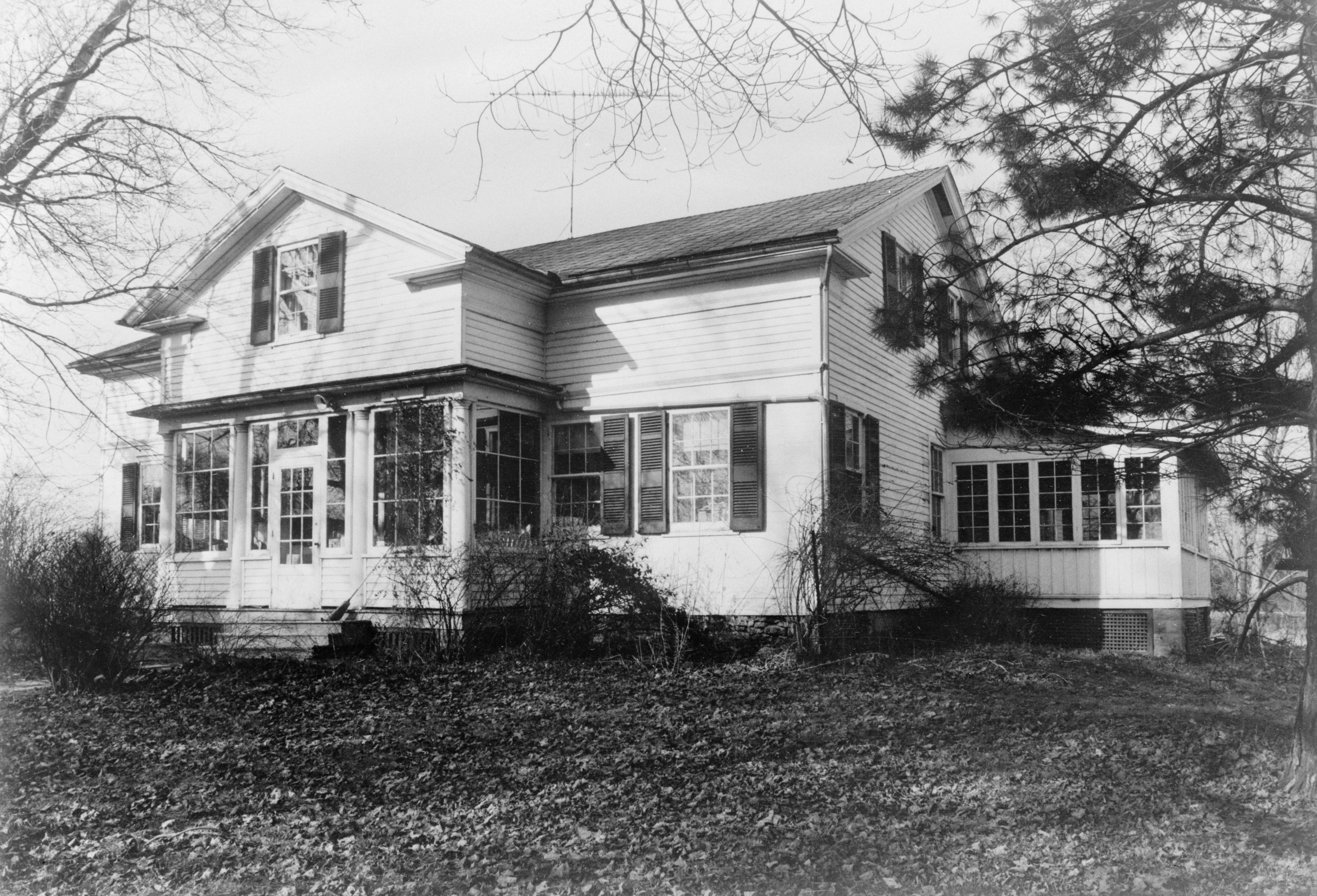
- Front of the house

- Location within Ohio Location within the United States
- Nearest city: Milan, Ohio
- Coordinates: 41°20′11″N 82°35′1″W
- Area: 1 acre (0.40 ha)
- Built: 1824
- Architect: David Abbott
- Architectural style: Federal, Greek Revival
- NRHP reference No.: 75001383
- Added to NRHP: May 27, 1975

Abbott–Page House is a historic house located on Mason Road, 2.5 miles northeast of Milan, Ohio. It is locally significant as an early, still surviving farm, and as a well-preserved example of Federal/Greek Revival architecture.

== Description and history ==
The 1 1/2-story house has a gabled roof and a modified T-shaped layout. It has historically been used as a single dwelling. It was listed on the National Register of Historic Places on May 27, 1975.

== Today ==
It is now a private residence.
