= Abbott Fuller Graves =

American painter

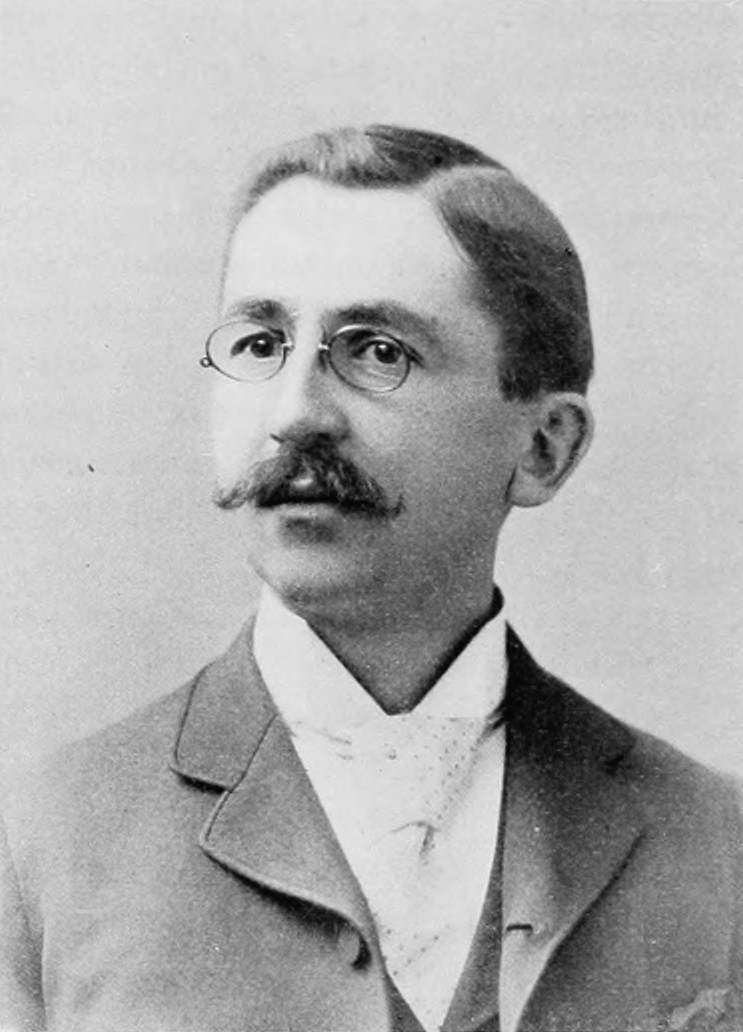
- Born: April 15, 1859; Weymouth, Massachusetts
- Died: July 15, 1936 (aged 77); Kennebunkport, Maine
- Known for: Still lifes, Floral painting
- Movement: Realism

Abbott Fuller Graves (1859–1936) was an American painter and illustrator who specialized in decorative open air garden paintings and floral still-lifes. His use of thick brushstrokes, bright colors, and natural light shows the influence of European impressionism.

== Early life and education ==
Graves was born in Weymouth, Massachusetts, on April 15, 1859, the son of James Griswold Graves and Eliza Nicholls (Fuller). Hoping to become an architect, Graves attended the Massachusetts Institute of Technology but did not graduate. Graves went to Paris and Italy in 1884 to refine his skills as a flower painter. In Europe, he roomed with Edmund C. Tarbell. After returning to Boston in 1885, Graves became a teacher at the Cowles Art School, where his friend Childe Hassam was also on the faculty. The two painters undoubtedly influenced one another. In 1887, Graves returned to Paris to study figure painting at the Académie Julian. There he was taught by Fernand Cormon, Jean-Paul Laurens and Paul Gervais

== Career ==
Graves returned to Boston in 1891, and lived in the coastal town of Kennebunkport, Maine, where he taught painting classes in oil and watercolor. He continued to visit there in later years, painting genre scenes featuring farmers, fishermen, firemen and old sea captains of Kennebunkport. Many of his portrayals of small-town life were reproduced on calendars and postcards.

After 1891, the majority of Graves's works depict gardens and floral landscapes, some including female figures. Some portray exotic gardens of Spain and South America. In 1891, he opened his own art school in Boston. The school later moved to Kennebunk, Maine. From 1902 to 1905, Graves was employed as a commercial illustrator for magazines in Paris. He also studied at the Académie Vitti in Paris. After 1922, Graves spent his winters in New York City, where he belonged to such organizations as the National Academy of Design, the National Arts Club, the Salmagundi Club and Allied Artists of America.

== Death ==
Graves died in Kennebunkport on July 15, 1936. At the time of his death, he had achieved wide acclaim as a specialist in garden painting.

== Legacy ==
Examples of Graves's work can be found in public and private collections across the country, including the Mead Art Museum at Amherst College, the Arnot Art Museum in Elmira, New York; the Brick Store Museum in Kennebunk, Maine; Ball State University Museum of Art in Muncie, Indiana; the Hermitage Foundation Museum in Norfolk, Virginia; and the Princeton University Art Museum in Princeton, New Jersey.

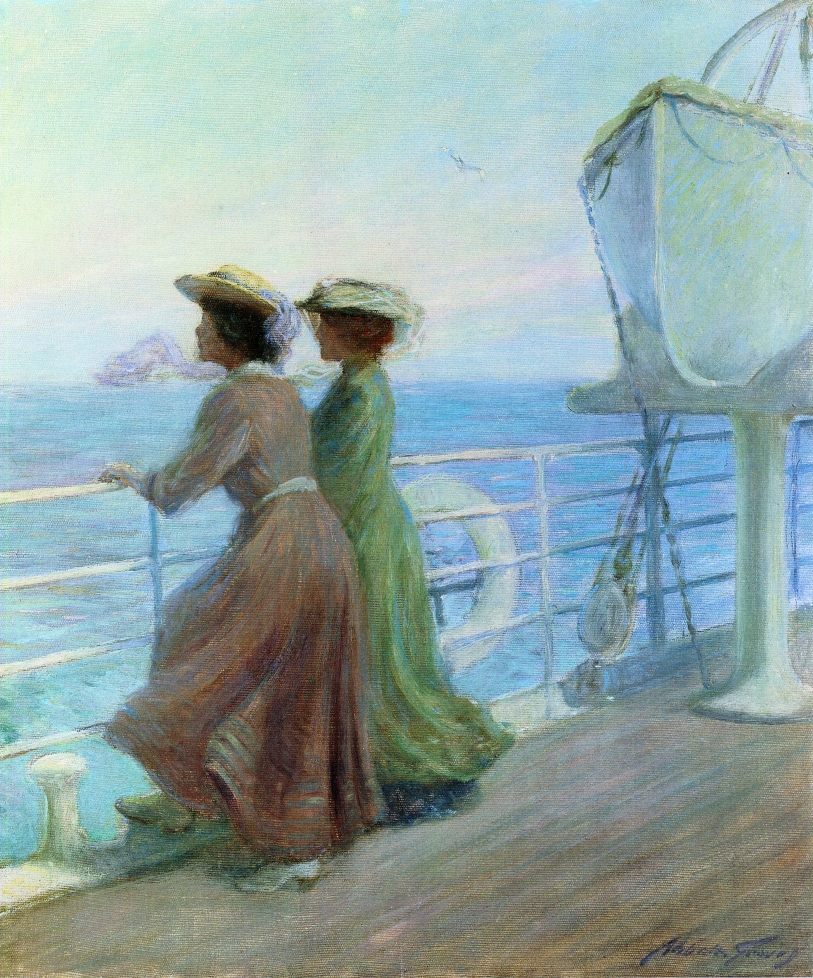
Nearing Home

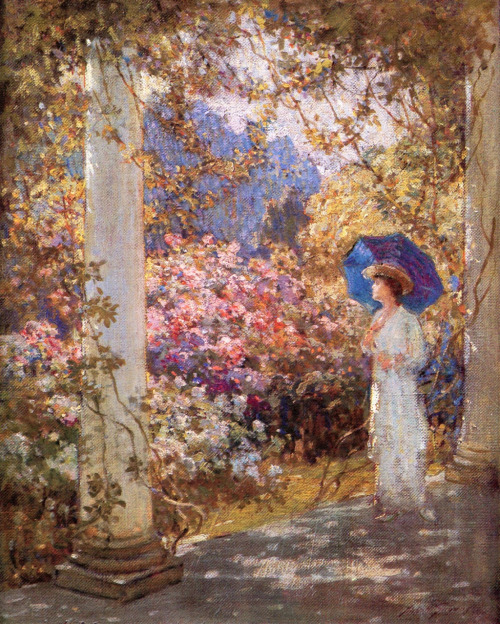
A Summer’s Day

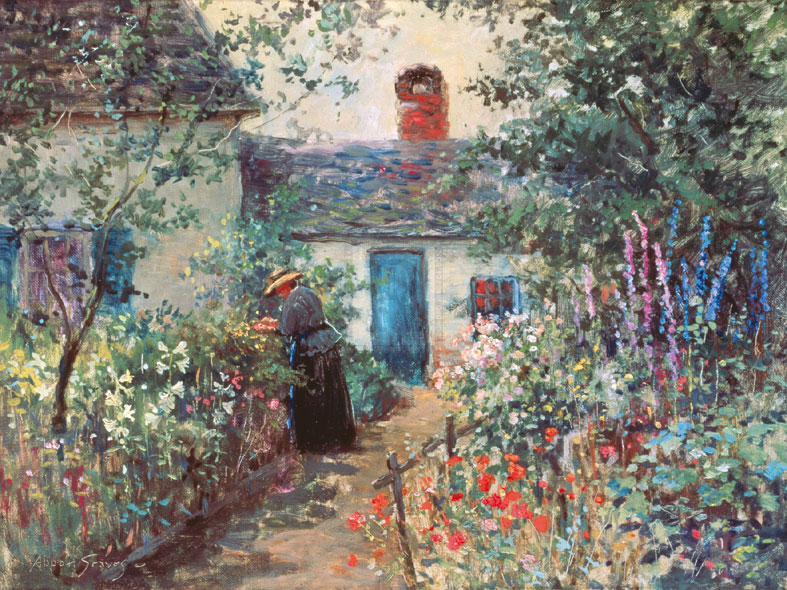
Flower garden, Kennebunkport

The Silent Partner aka The Organ Grinder (1894)

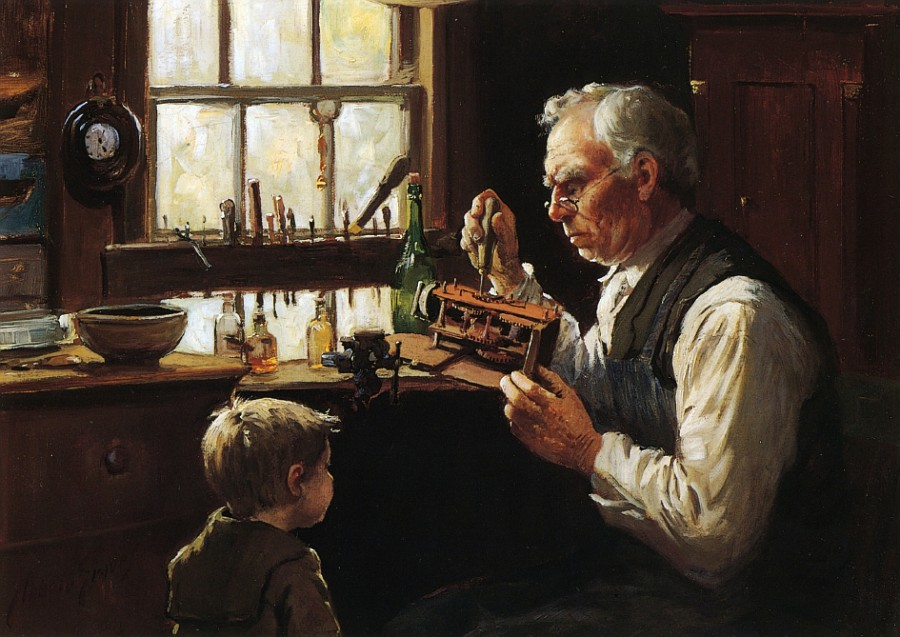
The Village Clockmaker

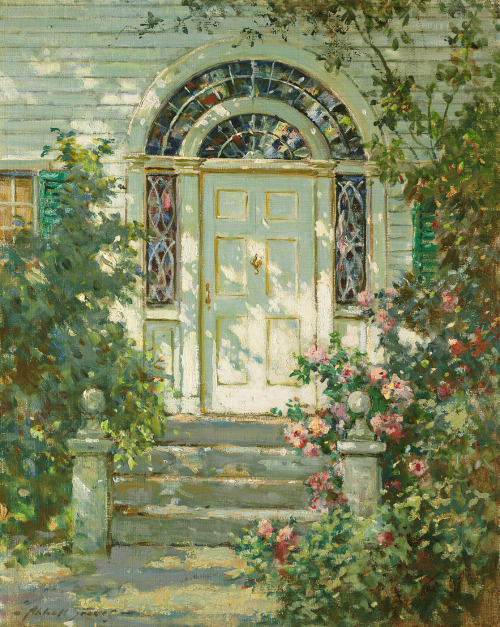
Ogunquit Doorway

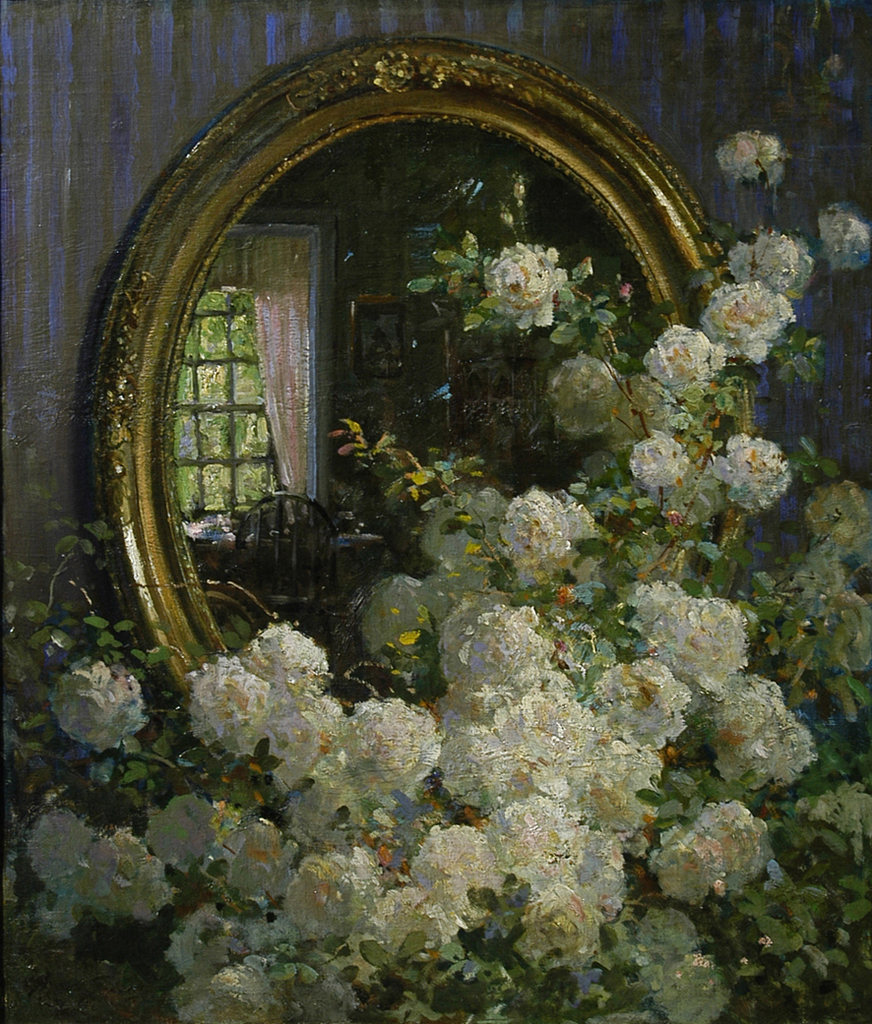
Flowers and Mirror

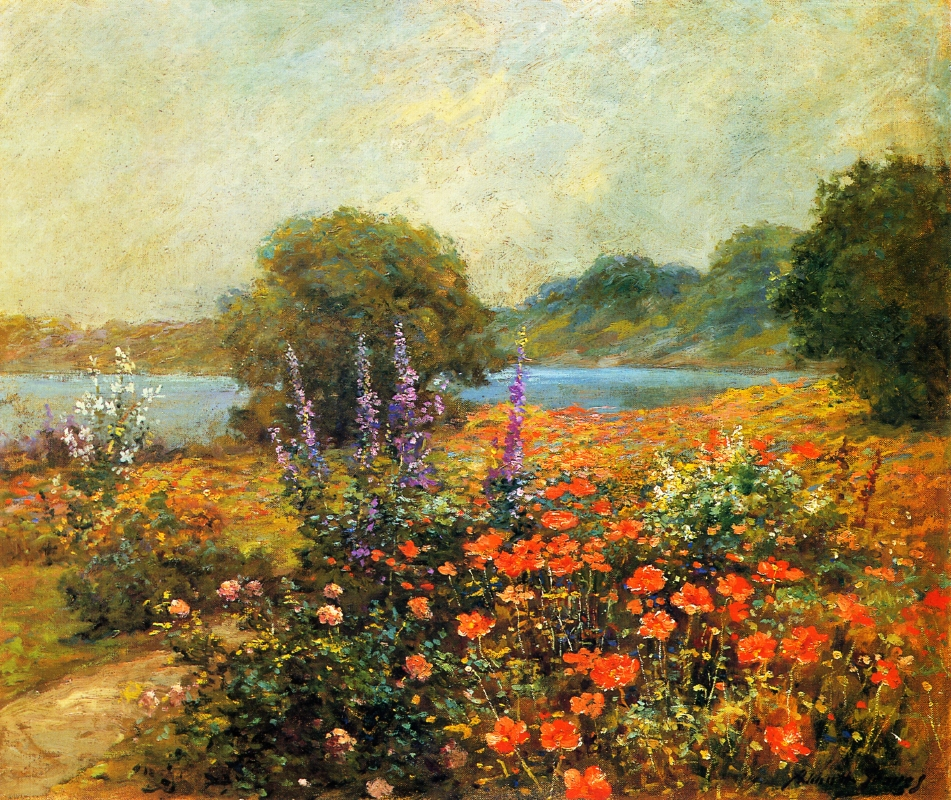
Poppies

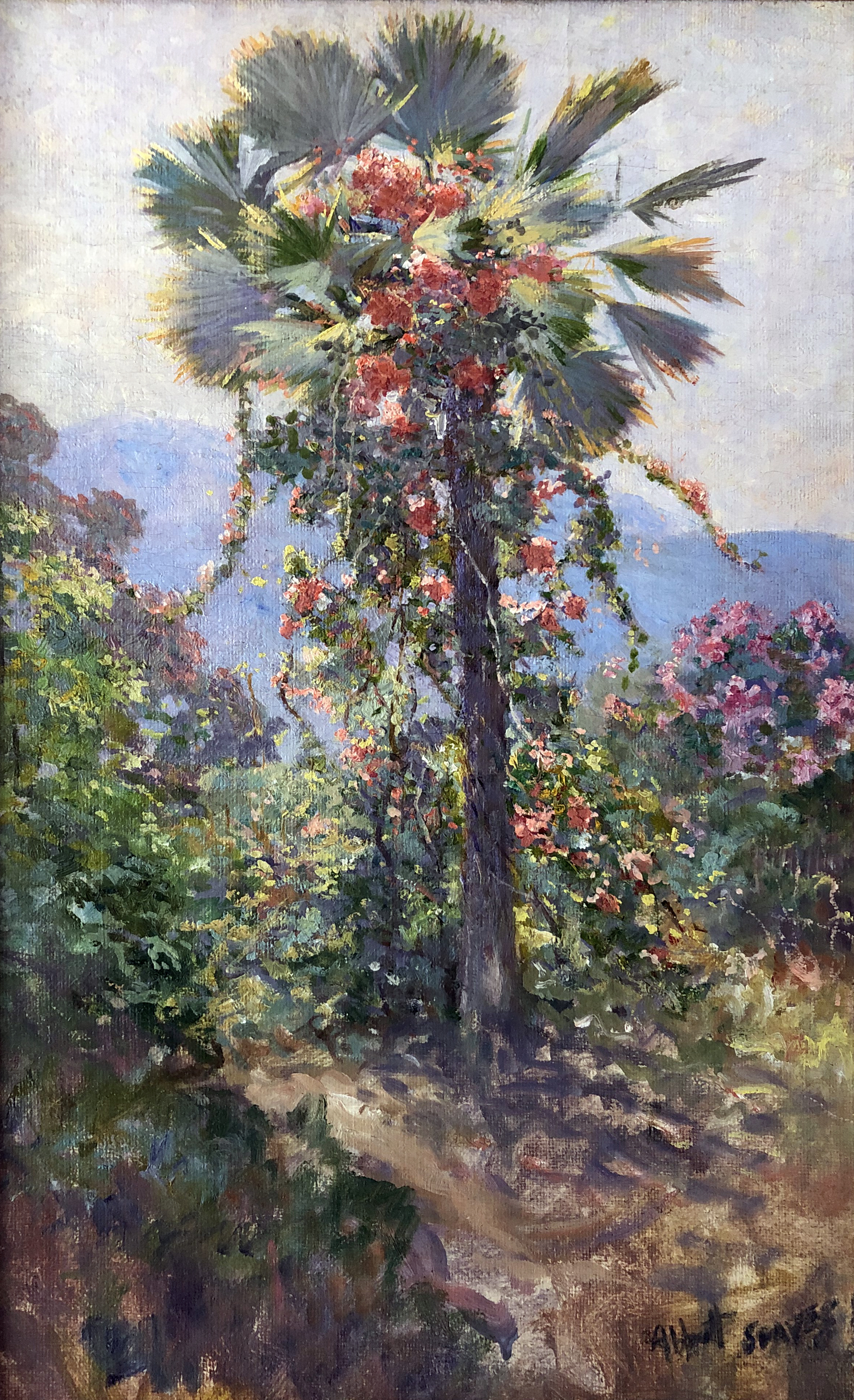
Flowering Vines

== See also ==
- Abbott Graves House in Kennebunkport, Maine
