= Abbot House =

Abbot House may refer to:

== In Scotland ==
- Abbot House, Dunfermline, a heritage centre in Scotland

== In the United States (by state) ==
- Asa and Sylvester Abbot House, Andover, MA
- Benjamin Abbot House, Andover, MA
- Edwin Abbot House, Cambridge, MA
- J. T. Abbot House, Andover, MA
- Abbot-Stinson House, Andover, MA
- Abbot-Baker House, Andover, MA
- Abbot-Battles House, Andover, MA
- Abbot House (Nashua, New Hampshire)

== See also ==
- Abbott House (disambiguation)
