= Capt. Joseph Hinckley House =

Historic house in Massachusetts, United States

- U.S. National Register of Historic Places
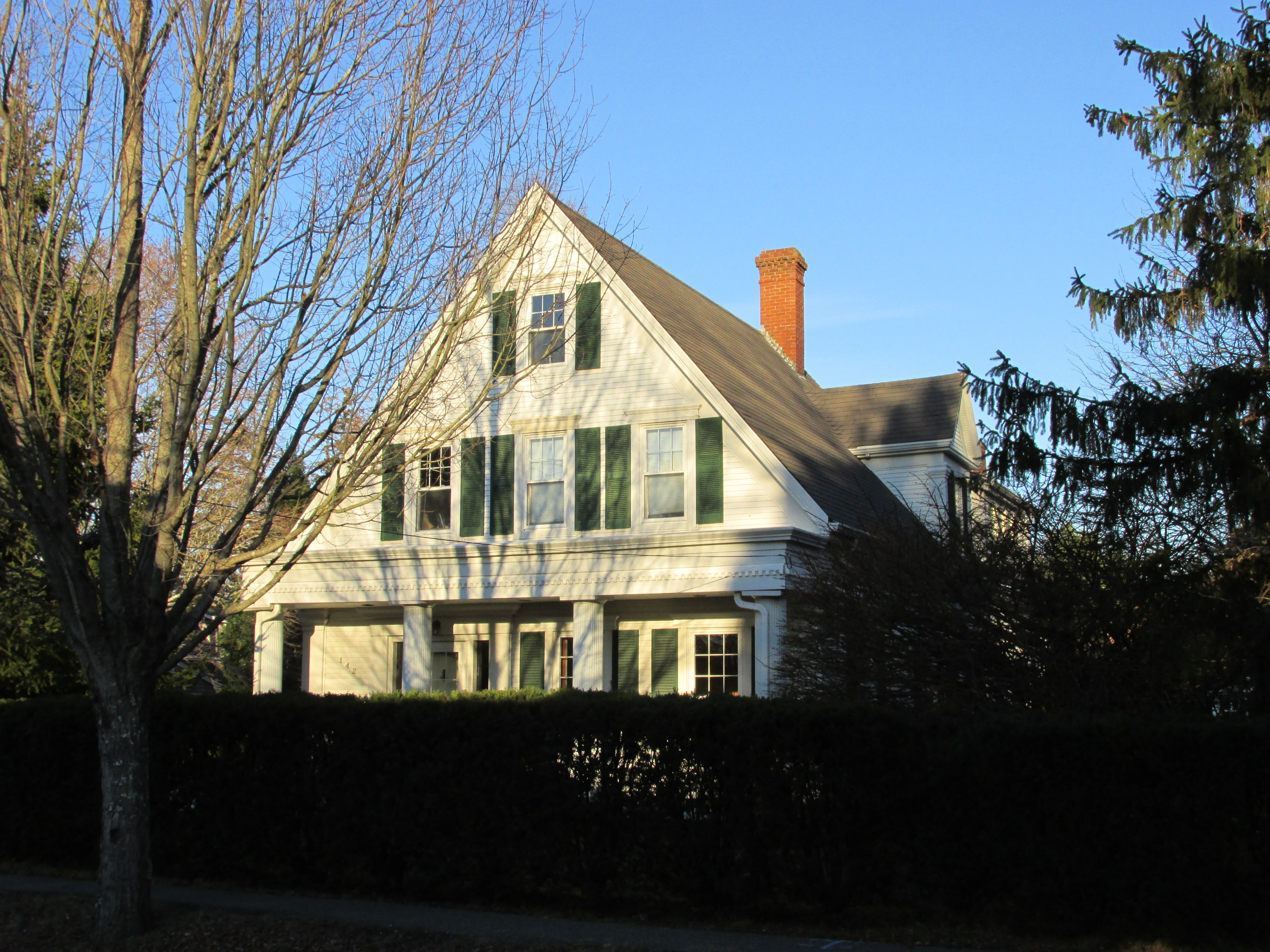
- 142 Old Stage Road

- Location within Cape Cod Location within Massachusetts
- Location: Barnstable, Massachusetts
- Coordinates: 41°39′14″N 70°21′2″W
- Area: 2.2 acres (0.89 ha)
- Built: 1850
- Architect: Cahoon, Bill
- Architectural style: Greek Revival
- MPS: Barnstable MRA
- NRHP reference No.: 87000249
- Added to NRHP: March 13, 1987

The Capt. Joseph Hinckley House is a historic house located at 142 Old Stage Road in Barnstable, Massachusetts.

== Description and history ==
The 1-3/4 story wood-frame house was built c. 1850, and is an excellent local instance of Greek Revival architecture. Its front facade is flushboarded on the first floor, with full-length windows. The front porch has a wide entablature that is continued around the sides of the house, and is supported by fluted Doric columns. The property includes a barn that was built c. 1827. It served for a time as a stop on the area stagecoach route, and was also home to Joseph Hinckley, a ship's captain.

The house was listed on the National Register of Historic Places on March 13, 1987.

== See also ==
- National Register of Historic Places listings in Barnstable County, Massachusetts
