= S. Alexander Hinckley House =

Historic house in Massachusetts, United States

- U.S. National Register of Historic Places
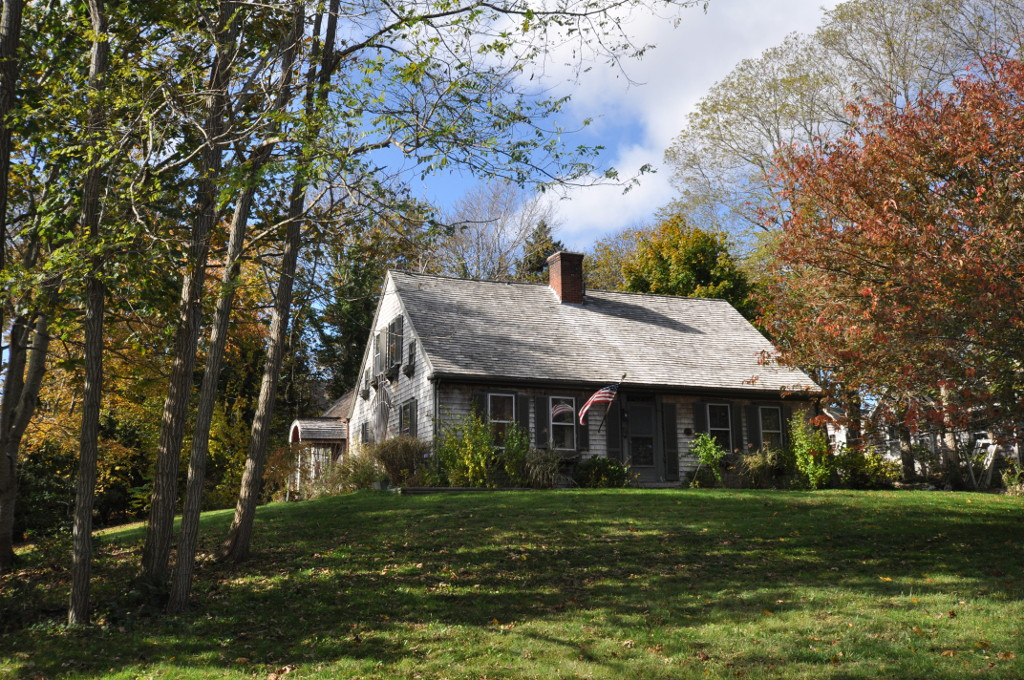

- Location within Cape Cod Location within Massachusetts
- Location: 151 Pine St., Barnstable, Massachusetts
- Coordinates: 41°38′48″N 70°17′13″W
- Built: 1710
- Architectural style: Colonial
- MPS: Barnstable MRA
- NRHP reference No.: 87000279
- Added to NRHP: September 18, 1987

The S. Alexander Hinckley House is a historic First Period house in the Hyannis section of Barnstable, Massachusetts.

== Description and history ==
The 1 1/2-story Cape house was built c. 1710, and is one of a small number of early 18th-century houses in Hyannis. It is the full five bays wide and two deep, with an ell added to the rear, and a central chimney. It was also home to Ora Hinckley, the first librarian of the Hyannis Library, around the turn of the 20th century.

The house was listed on the National Register of Historic Places on September 18, 1987.

== See also ==
- National Register of Historic Places listings in Barnstable County, Massachusetts
