= Fenton Seminary =

- Formerly listed on the U.S. National Register of Historic Places
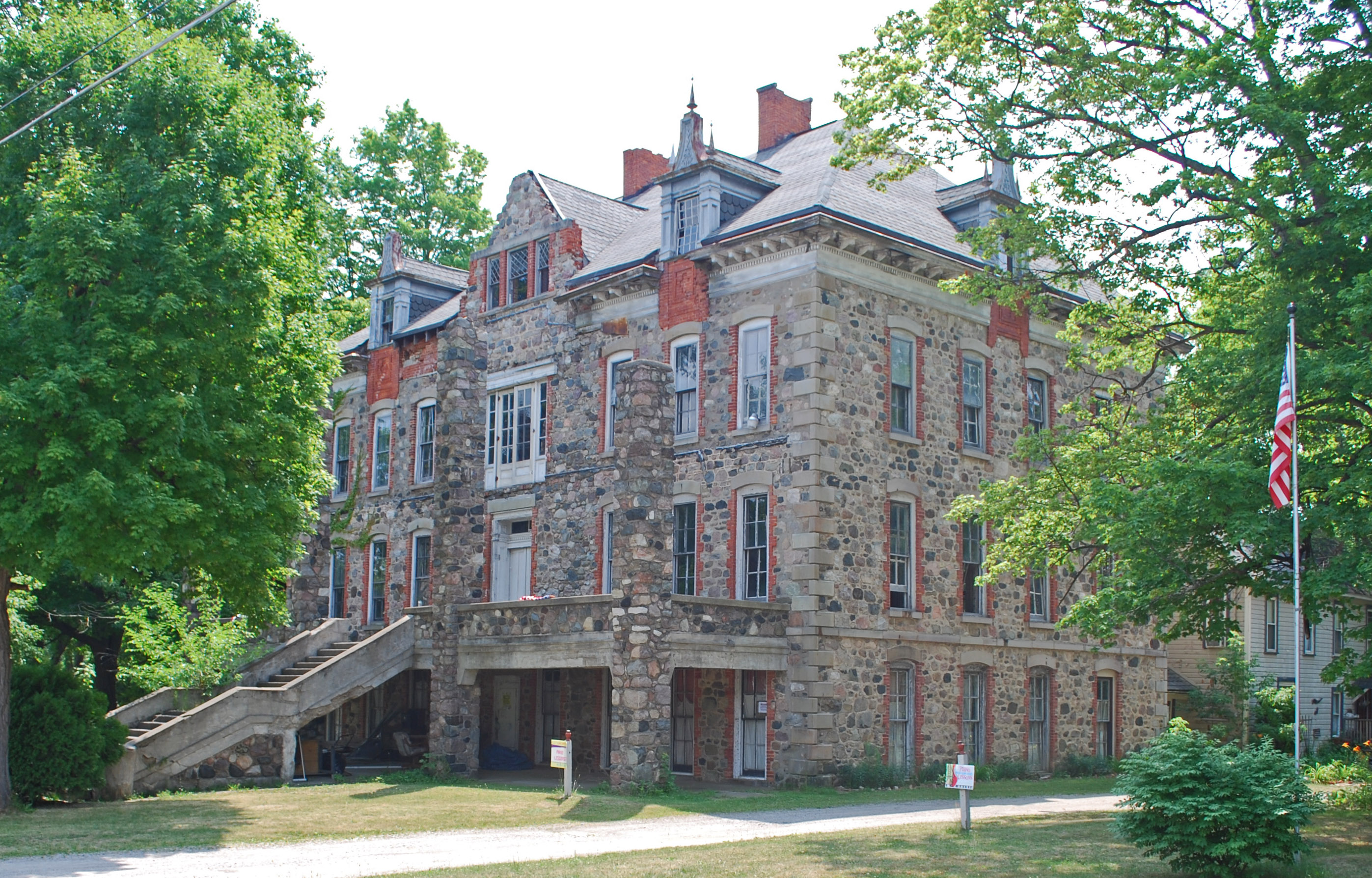
- Seminary in 2011
- Interactive map
- Location: 309 High St., Fenton, Michigan
- Coordinates: 42°47′16″N 83°42′34″W
- Area: less than one acre
- Built: 1868
- Architectural style: Second Empire
- Demolished: September 2015
- MPS: Genesee County MRA
- NRHP reference No.: 82000508

Significant dates
- Added to NRHP: November 26, 1982
- Removed from NRHP: July 1, 2020

The Fenton Seminary was an educational building located at 309 High Street in Fenton, Michigan. It was listed on the National Register of Historic Places in 1982. The building was demolished in 2015 and removed from the NRHP in 2020.

== History ==
The Fenton Seminary was founded by Rosina L. Dayfoot under the auspices of the Baptist Church, as a feeder preparatory school for students attending Kalamazoo College. It first held classes in a frame structure, but in about 1868 the school constructed this building. The seminary operated for nearly 20 years, offering classes in business, languages, music, and calisthenics. However, in 1886, the board of trustees deemed it impossible to continue operating, and the school was closed. The trustees offered the building to the Baptist Ministers Aid Society, and it served as a home for retired ministers. A fire in 1899 gutted the interior and destroyed the roof; the building was reconstructed in 1900 with an altered roof and facade.

The building continued to be used by the Baptist Ministers Aid Society, then as an apartment complex and a convalescence home, until 1967. There were several attempts at rehabilitation, but the building remained vacant until 2014, when it reverted to the city of Fenton for back taxes. The city demolished the building in September 2015.

== Description ==
The Fenton Seminary was a two-story stone building. It was originally constructed as a three-story structure in the Second Empire style, but during the reconstruction in 1900, the original mansard roof was replaced with a hip roof, creating a two-story structure. The front facade had a porch with stone piers, accessed with a stairway. A central gabled dormer on the roof was flanked with decorative metal ones.
