= Nymphus Hinckley House =

Historic house in Massachusetts, United States

- U.S. National Register of Historic Places
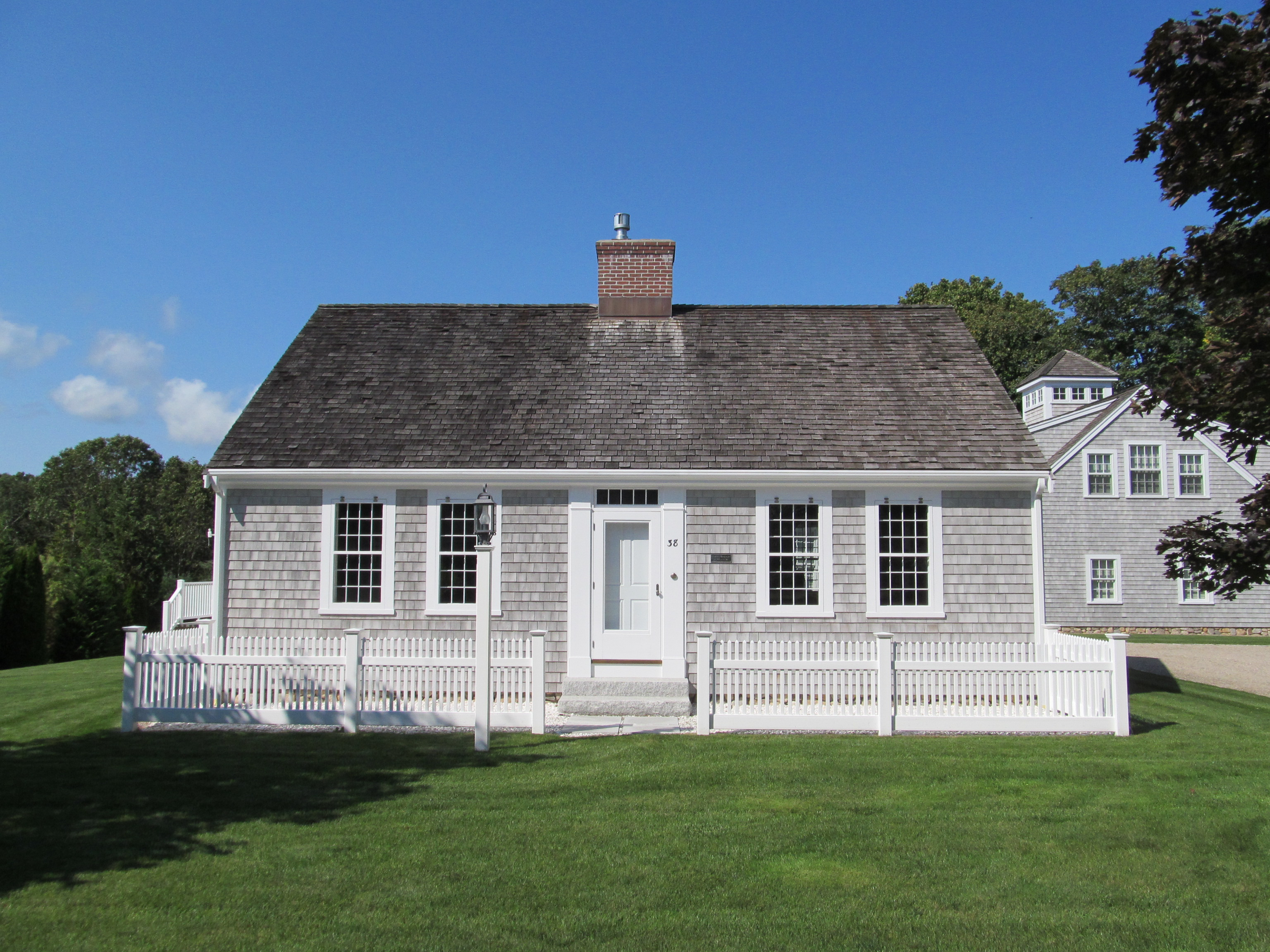
- Nymphus Hinckley House

- Location within Cape Cod Location within Massachusetts Location within the United States
- Location: 38 Bay Street, Barnstable, Massachusetts
- Coordinates: 41°37′44″N 70°23′18″W
- Area: 1.07 acres (0.43 ha)
- Built: 1780
- Architectural style: Federal
- MPS: Barnstable MRA
- NRHP reference No.: 87000250
- Added to NRHP: March 13, 1987

The Nymphus Hinckley House is a historic house located in the Osterville village of Barnstable, Massachusetts.

== Description and history ==
The 1 1/2-story Cape cottage was built c. 1780, and is a well-preserved Federal style structure on a property that also has a period barn. Located just outside Osterville village, it is five bays wide, and has a centered entry with a five-pane transom window. The windows and entry butt directly against the eaves. The house was built by Nymphus Hinckley, a veteran of the American Revolutionary War.

The house was listed on the National Register of Historic Places on March 13, 1987.

== See also ==
- National Register of Historic Places listings in Barnstable County, Massachusetts
