= Jonathan Abbatt =

Canadian chemist

Jonathan Abbatt is a Canadian chemist at the University of Toronto and an Elected Fellow of the American Geophysical Union. He studies chemical processes in both the atmosphere and indoor environment.

== Education ==
Abbatt received a BSc from the University of Toronto (1984) before attending Harvard University where he earned a Ph.D. in atmospheric chemistry (1990).

== Research and career ==
Abbatt was a postdoctoral student at MIT, and became a professor at the University of Chicago. He joined the University of Toronto as an atmospheric and environmental chemist in 2000.

Abbatt does both laboratory and field work relating to environmental science and atmospheric chemistry. He examines phenomena such as Arctic aerosols, atmospheric ozone, cloud formation, urban haze, wildfire emissions and climate, as well as the indoor environment. Abbatt co-chaired the Gordon Conference on Atmospheric Chemistry in 2011. He served on the scientific steering committee of the International Global Atmospheric Chemistry project. He led the NETCARE (Network on Climate and Aerosols) team, which won the 2020 Brockhouse Canada Prize for Interdisciplinary Research in Science and Engineering from NSERC.

In 2022, Abbatt led a multi-institution initiative to examine the absorption of volatile organic compounds (VOCs) by indoor surfaces, using simulation chambers at the National Institute of Standards and Technology’s Net-Zero Energy Residential Test Facility. The research showed that concrete, wood, and painted surfaces, which are permeable and porous, act as surface reservoirs that can retain harmful chemicals long after they were introduced into an indoor space.

=== Awards and honors ===
Abbatt's honors and awards include:

- 2023, Jacob Bjerknes Lecture, American Geophysical Union
- 2023, JJ Berry Smith Award for Doctoral Supervision, School of Graduate Studies, University of Toronto
- 2020, Chemical Institute of Canada Award
- 2020, Brockhouse Canada Prize for Interdisciplinary Research in Science and Engineering, NSERC
- 2015, Killam Research Fellowship
- 2012, elected member, Royal Society of Canada
- 1992, Fellow, American Geophysical Union
