= Abbott Hall Brisbane =

American novelist

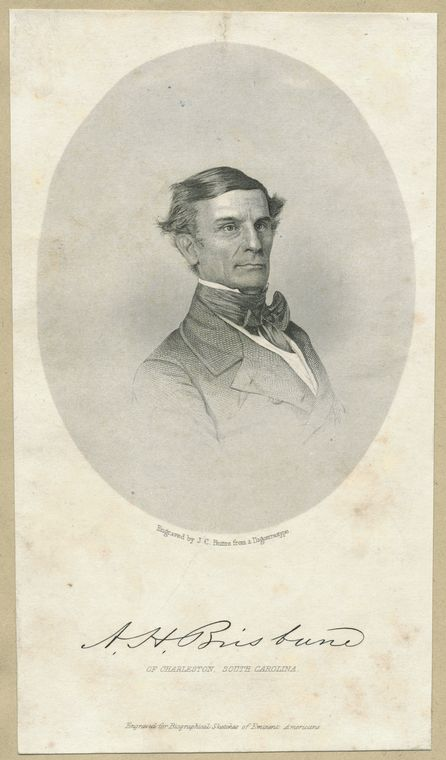
- Born: December 4, 1804
- Died: September 28, 1861

Abbott Hall Brisbane (December 4, 1804 – September 28, 1861) was a prominent South Carolinian whose accomplishments included an extensive military career, engineering work, a professorship, authorship of a major Roman Catholic inspirational novel, and eventually, in retirement, a slave-holding plantation owner before the U.S. Civil War.

== Family ==
Abbott Hall Brisbane was born the son of John S. Brisbane on December 4, 1804. Although he is famed for his devotion to Roman Catholicism, "Abbott" was a traditional name in his family and not an ecclesiastical title.

On March 26, 1829, he married Adeline E. White, herself born in Charleston January 17, 1807, the "daughter of the distinguished painter John Blake White." They had one son together, who died in infancy, "and his loss nearly broke his father's heart." According to a family member, as a result of the comfort and counseling they received from Bishop John England after this tragedy, both John and Adeline converted to Roman Catholicism.

A researcher revisiting the issue over 170 years later attributes his conversion to his admiration of the Irish Catholics who served with him in the Seminole War. As anti-Catholicism was seriously on the rise in the 1830s and 1840s, this conversion—to which they both remained faithful to the end of their lives—was particularly remarkable.

Though he had no children of his own who survived to adulthood, Brisbane's niece, Mary Catharine Brisbane Hickox (1832–1913), wrote a brief reflection about his life. Her report of their married life reveals a very affectionate and balanced relationship, with Adeline "calm and self-reliant as a man" and having the good spirits to lift Brisbane from depression. "He always called her 'Wifie' and she called him Mr. Brisbane as did most of the wives at that time in Charleston. I don't know what the custom was elsewhere....Fortunately for him he died some years before she did, just after the opening of the civil war in 1861. I am sure he could never have lived without her protecting love." Hickox writes that Brisbane was about to engage in the "War of Secession" – the U.S. Civil War – at the time of his death.

After Brisbane died, his widow traveled first to Albany to settle family financial affairs. In 1870, Adeline moved back to South Carolina into the Ursuline Convent in Columbia. Although some sources reported that she became a nun, her niece stated that her aunt merely lived there without taking vows: "She contemplated taking the black veil, but I am not sure that she ever did. We heard afterwards that she did not do so." However, a diocesan archivist wrote in 2002 that she had uncovered records indicating that Adeline E. White Brisbane took vows with the Ursulines after her 1870 return, becoming "Sister Borgia" until her death in 1872.

== Career ==
In 1821, Abbott Hall Brisbane applied to and was accepted by the U.S. Military Academy, now commonly known as West Point. In 1825, at the age of 21, he graduated. In the Third Regiment of Artillery of the South Carolina Volunteers, he was promoted: "Brevet Second Lieut. Abbott H. Brisbane, to be Second Lieut., 1 July 1825. He resigned from that service on January 1, 1828.

He was made a colonel of the South Carolina Volunteers on February 7, 1836. He then served in Florida in the Seminole Wars under General Scott. In the campaign of 1835-36, he was involved in a skirmish at Tomoka on March 10, 1836, which had a strong positive impact on his reputation. He was promoted to brigadier general when he returned to Charleston. He mustered out honorably on May 7, 1836.

He then spent four years as "Constructing Engineer" for the proposed Charleston & Cincinnati Railroad. In 1841, he traveled north to New York to hire Irish workers for the Flint & Ocmulgee Line in Savannah, Georgia, promising "good pay" of $2.25 per day. The workers were paid in scrip that could only be redeemed at company stores; to speed the project, Brisbane needed cash. To get it, he approached Bishops John Hughes (New York) and Ignatius A. Reynolds (Charleston) for loans, as well as support from the City of Savannah. Although some funds were forthcoming, the lack of progress by 1843 made Hughes retreat from his commitment. This left Brisbane with nothing to pay the workers who took him and his wife hostage in their own cabin until rescued by armed horsemen.

After that episode, the Brisbanes moved to Albany, becoming the first Catholic family there. They continued to try to raise money for the Flint & Ocmulgee Line, even from European investors, until returning to Charleston in 1847.

In 1847–48, he took a position as supervising engineer for the construction of an artesian well for the City of Charleston. The same year, he became a professor at The Citadel and taught history, belles lettres, and ethics until his retirement in 1853.

Prior to that time, while surveying land in Georgia, Brisbane spent all the money he had to speculate on eight miles of land where he thought a railbed would be placed. The project did not take place as planned, and at one point, the Brisbanes lacked even sufficient funds to pick up a postage-due letter which had been sent to offer them a loan. Brisbane never lost faith in the land purchase, and continued to pay taxes on it until he died.

He retired to his plantation, Accabee (outside Charleston). The 1860 Slave Schedules of the U.S. Census list him as owner of 59 black slaves, from infants to age 85, in Ward 2 of Charleston city, and another 30 black slaves in St. Andrew's Parish in Charleston County, ranging from infants to age 90.

Abbott Hall Brisbane died in the community of Summerville on September 28, 1861.

== Novel ==
Brisbane and his wife converted to Catholicism after the death of their infant son, and in widowhood, Adeline moved into a convent and possibly took vows there. Brisbane himself was extremely devout, and authored what on expert described as "the only Catholic [inspirational] novel from the deep South" in the first half of the 1800s.

Ralphton; The Young Carolinian of 1776, A Romance on the Philosophy of Politics, was published in Charleston by Burgess and James in 1848. The book uses the character of Father Duane, a Jesuit, to expound Brisbane's own economic philosophies which the expert describes as:

He is certainly a foe of laissez faire economics and a believer in economic controls. The perfect society is to be brought about by a proper interaction of the powers of the state, the Church, and wealth and by the equivalence of the agricultural, commercial, and manufacturing interests.

Brisbane's niece had a strong opinion of her own:

Uncle Abbott was a very fine draftsman and quite literary. He once wrote a novel called Ralphston, but it was not very interesting and I never could wade through it.

This apparently began with the very first word in the title, which she spelled incorrectly in her memoir. In his preface to the novel, Brisbane states he has modeled the character of Father Duane on Father John Carroll, the Jesuit who became the first (and, at the time, the only) bishop of the United States in 1789.
