= Hinckley Homestead =

Historic house in Massachusetts, United States

- U.S. National Register of Historic Places
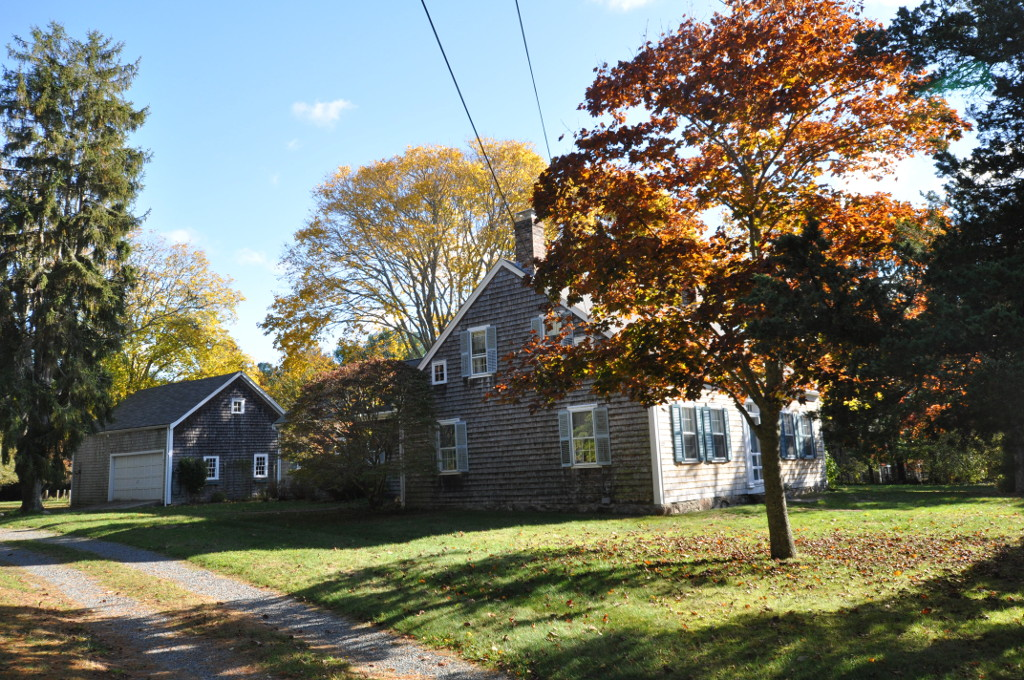

- Location within Cape Cod Location within Massachusetts Location within the United States
- Location: 1740 South County Rd., Barnstable, Massachusetts
- Coordinates: 41°38′57″N 70°23′52″W
- Built: 1750
- Architectural style: Georgian
- MPS: Barnstable MRA
- NRHP reference No.: 87000248
- Added to NRHP: September 18, 1987

The Hinckley Homestead is a historic house located in the Marstons Mills area of Barnstable, Massachusetts.

== Description and history ==
The 1 1/2-story Cape house was probably built c. 1750, although local historians assert it may have been built earlier. Its likely builder was Edmund Hinckley, grandson of early settler Samuel Hinckley. It has remained in the hands of his descendants; many of its exterior and interior Georgian details have been preserved.

The house was listed on the National Register of Historic Places on September 18, 1987.

== See also ==
- National Register of Historic Places listings in Barnstable County, Massachusetts
