= Martha Nussbaum =

American philosopher and academic (born 1947)

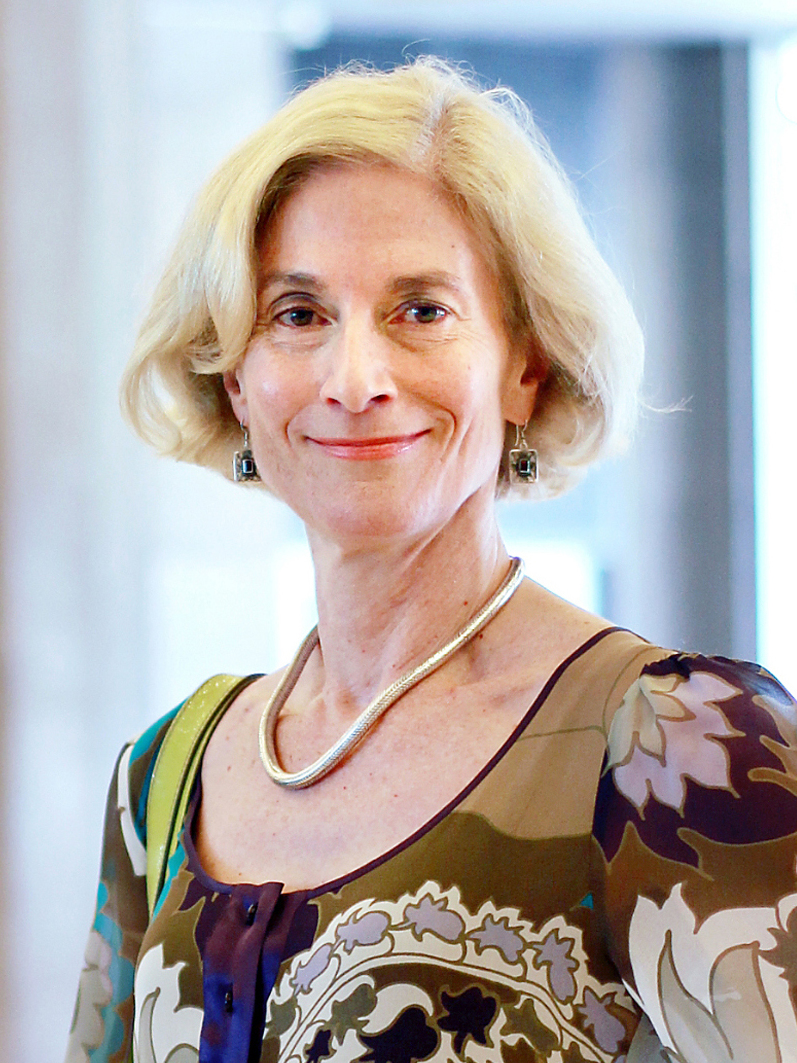
- Nussbaum in 2010
- Born: Martha Craven Warren; May 6, 1947 (age 79); New York City, U.S.
- Spouse: Alan Nussbaum (m. 1969; div. 1987)
- Awards: Kyoto Prize (2016); Berggruen Prize (2018); Holberg Prize (2021); Balzan Prize (2022)

Education
- Education: New York University (BA); Harvard University (MA, PhD)
- Thesis: Aristotle's "De Motu Animalium"
- Doctoral advisor: G. E. L. Owen

Philosophical work
- School: Analytic philosophy; Aristotelianism; feminism; social liberalism
- Institutions: University of Chicago; Brown University; Harvard University
- Doctoral students: Christine Korsgaard
- Main interests: Political philosophy; ethics; feminism; liberal theory
- Notable works: The Fragility of Goodness (1986)
- Notable ideas: Capability approach

Martha C. Nussbaum (/ˈnʊsbɔːm/; née Craven; born May 6, 1947) is an American philosopher and the Ernst Freund Distinguished Service Professor of Law and Ethics at the University of Chicago, where she is jointly appointed in the law school and the philosophy department.

Nussbaum's work has concerned ancient Greek and Roman philosophy, political philosophy, existentialism, feminism, and ethics, such as animal rights. She holds associate appointments in classics, divinity, and political science, and is a member of the Committee on Southern Asian Studies and a board member of the Human Rights Program. She previously taught at Harvard and Brown.

Nussbaum has written more than two dozen books, including The Fragility of Goodness (1986). She received the 2016 Kyoto Prize in Arts and Philosophy, the 2018 Berggruen Prize, and the 2021 Holberg Prize. In the early 2020s, she was considered a candidate for the Nobel Prize in Literature.

== Early life and education ==
Nussbaum was born Martha Craven on May 6, 1947, in New York City, the daughter of George Craven, a Philadelphia lawyer, and Betty Warren, an interior designer and homemaker. During her teenage years, Nussbaum attended The Baldwin School in Bryn Mawr. She described her upbringing as "East Coast WASP elite ... very sterile, very preoccupied with money and status". She would later credit her impatience with "mandarin philosophers" and dedication to public service as the "repudiation of my own aristocratic upbringing. I don't like anything that sets itself up as an in-group or an elite, whether it is the Bloomsbury group or Derrida".

After studying at Wellesley College for two years, Nussbaum dropped out to pursue theatre in New York. She studied theatre and classics at New York University, getting a Bachelor of Arts degree in 1969, and gradually moved to philosophy while at Harvard University, where she received an M.A. in 1972 and a Ph.D. in 1975, studying under G. E. L. Owen.

== Career ==
In the 1970s and early 1980s, Nussbaum taught philosophy and classics at Harvard, where she was denied tenure by the Classics Department in 1982. Nussbaum then moved to Brown University, where she taught until 1995 when she joined the University of Chicago Law School faculty. Her 1986 book The Fragility of Goodness, on ancient Greek ethics and Greek tragedy, made her a well-known figure throughout the humanities. At Brown, Nussbaum's students included philosopher Linda Martín Alcoff and actor and playwright Tim Blake Nelson. In 1987, she gained public attention due to her critique of fellow philosopher Allan Bloom's The Closing of the American Mind. More recent work (Frontiers of Justice) establishes Nussbaum as a theorist of global justice. Nussbaum's work on capabilities has often concerned the unequal freedoms and opportunities of women, and she has developed a distinctive type of feminism, drawing inspiration from the liberal tradition, but emphasizing that liberalism, at its best, entails radical rethinking of gender relations and relations within the family.

Nussbaum's other major area of philosophical work is the emotions. She defended a neo-Stoic account of emotions that holds that they are appraisals that ascribe to things and persons, outside the agent's own control, great significance for the person's own flourishing. On this basis, she has proposed analyses of grief, compassion, and love, and, in a later book, of disgust and shame. Nussbaum has engaged in debates with other intellectuals, in her academic writings as well as in the pages of semi-popular magazines and book reviews and, in one instance, when testifying as an expert witness in court. She testified in the Colorado bench trial for Romer v. Evans, arguing against the claim that the history of philosophy provides the state with a "compelling interest" in favor of a law that sought to overturn local anti-discrimination laws. A portion of this testimony, dealing with the potential meanings of the term tolmêma in Plato's work, was the subject of controversy, and was called misleading and even perjurious by critics.

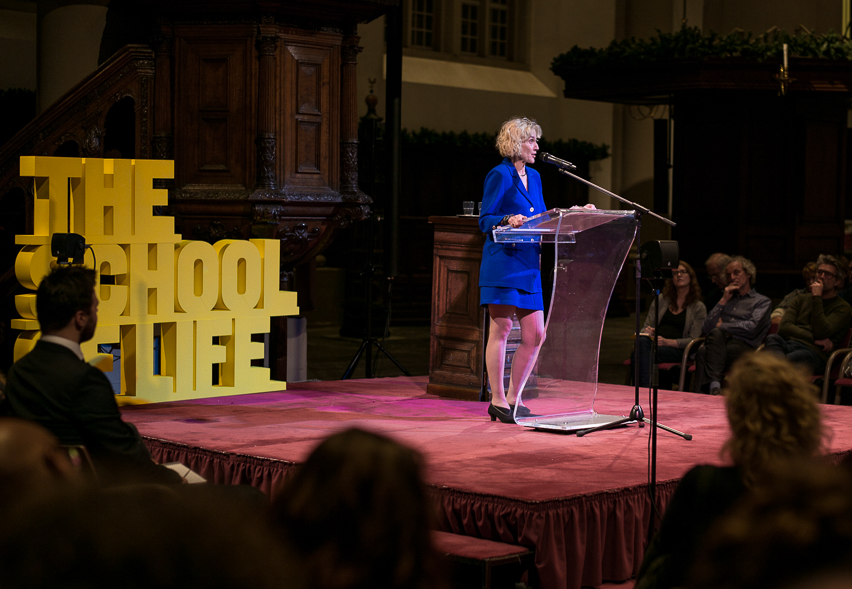
Nussbaum at The School of Life, 2016

Nussbaum responded to these charges in a lengthy article called "Platonic Love and Colorado Law". Nussbaum used multiple references from Plato's Symposium and his interactions with Socrates as evidence for her argument. The debate continued with a reply by one of her sternest critics, Robert P. George. Nussbaum has criticized Noam Chomsky as being among the leftist intellectuals who hold the belief that "one should not criticize one's friends, that solidarity is more important than ethical correctness". She suggests that one can "trace this line to an old Marxist contempt for bourgeois ethics, but it is loathsome whatever its provenance". Among her academic colleagues whose books she has reviewed critically are Allan Bloom, Harvey Mansfield, and Judith Butler. Other academic debates have been with figures such as John Rawls, Richard Posner, and Susan Moller Okin. In January 2019, Nussbaum announced that she would be using a portion of her Berggruen Prize winnings to fund a series of roundtable discussions on controversial issues at the University of Chicago Law School. These discussions will be known as the Martha C. Nussbaum Student Roundtables.

=== Capabilities approach ===
Nussbaum is well known for her contributions in developing the capabilities approach to well-being, alongside Amartya Sen. The key question the capabilities approach asks is "What is each person able to do and to be?" As such, the approach looks at combined capabilities: an individual's developable abilities (internal abilities), freedom, and opportunity. Here, "freedom" refers to the ability of a person to choose one life or another, and opportunity refers to social, political, and/or economic conditions that allow or disallow individual growth.

Nussbaum asserts that all humans (and non-human animals) have a basic right to dignity. To provide human dignity, she states that governments must provide "at least a threshold level" of the following capabilities: life; bodily health; bodily integrity; senses, imagination, and thought, emotions; practical reason; affiliation; other species; play; and control over one's environment, including political and material environments.

== Personal life ==
Nussbaum was married to Alan Nussbaum from 1969 until they divorced in 1987; during the marriage she converted to Judaism and gave birth to her daughter Rachel. Nussbaum's interest in Judaism has continued and deepened; on August 16, 2008, she became a bat mitzvah in a service at Temple K. A. M. Isaiah Israel in Chicago's Hyde Park, chanting from the Parashah Va-etchanan and the Haftarah Nahamu, and delivering a D'var Torah about the connection between genuine, non-narcissistic consolation and the pursuit of global justice.

Nussbaum's daughter Rachel died in 2019 due to a drug-resistant infection following successful transplant surgery. At the time of her death, she was a government affairs attorney in the Wildlife Division of Friends of Animals, a nonprofit organization working for animal welfare. The two women had co-authored four articles about wild animals. Nussbaum dated and lived with Cass Sunstein for more than a decade. They had been engaged to be married. She had previously had a romantic relationship with Amartya Sen.

== Major works ==
=== The Fragility of Goodness ===
The Fragility of Goodness: Luck and Ethics in Greek Tragedy and Philosophy confronts the ethical dilemma that individuals strongly committed to justice are nevertheless vulnerable to external factors that may deeply compromise or even negate their human flourishing. Discussing literary as well as philosophical texts, Nussbaum seeks to determine the extent to which reason may enable self-sufficiency. She eventually rejects the Platonic notion that human goodness can fully protect against peril, siding with the tragic playwrights and Aristotle in treating the acknowledgment of vulnerability as a key to realizing the human good.

Nussbaum's interpretation of Plato's Symposium in particular drew considerable attention. Under her consciousness of vulnerability, the re-entrance of Alcibiades at the end of the dialogue undermines Diotima's account of the ladder of love in its ascent to the non-physical realm of the forms. Alcibiades's presence deflects attention back to physical beauty, sexual passions, and bodily limitations, hence highlighting human fragility. Fragility brought attention to Nussbaum throughout the humanities. It garnered wide praise in academic reviews, and even drew acclaim in the popular media. Camille Paglia credited Fragility with matching "the highest academic standards" of the twentieth century, and The Times Higher Education called it "a supremely scholarly work". Nussbaum's reputation extended her influence beyond print and into television programs like PBS's Bill Moyers.

=== Cultivating Humanity ===
Cultivating Humanity: A Classical Defense of Reform in Liberal Education appeals to classical Greek texts as a basis for defense and reform of the liberal education. Noting the Greek cynic philosopher Diogenes' aspiration to transcend "local origins and group memberships" in favor of becoming "a citizen of the world", Nussbaum traces the development of this idea through the Stoics, Cicero, and eventually the classical liberalism of Adam Smith and Immanuel Kant. Nussbaum champions multiculturalism in the context of ethical universalism, defends scholarly inquiry into race, gender, and human sexuality, and further develops the role of literature as narrative imagination into ethical questions.

At the same time, Nussbaum also censured certain scholarly trends. She excoriated deconstructionist Jacques Derrida saying "on truth [he is] simply not worth studying for someone who has been studying Quine and Putnam and Davidson". She cites Zhang Longxi, who labels Derrida's analysis of Chinese culture "pernicious" and without "evidence of serious study". More broadly, Nussbaum criticized Michel Foucault for his "historical incompleteness [and] lack of conceptual clarity", but nevertheless singled him out for providing "the only truly important work to have entered philosophy under the banner of 'postmodernism.'

Nussbaum is even more critical of figures like Allan Bloom, Roger Kimball, and George Will for what she considers their "shaky" knowledge of non-Western cultures and inaccurate caricatures of today's humanities departments. The New York Times praised Cultivating Humanity as "a passionate, closely argued defense of multiculturalism" and hailed it as "a formidable, perhaps definitive defense of diversity on American campuses". Nussbaum received the 2002 University of Louisville Grawemeyer Award in Education for Cultivating Humanity.

=== Sex and Social Justice ===
Sex and Social Justice argues that sex and sexuality are morally irrelevant distinctions that have been artificially enforced as sources of social hierarchy; thus, feminism and social justice have common concerns. Rejecting anti-universalist objections, Nussbaum proposes functional freedoms, or central human capabilities, as a rubric of social justice. Nussbaum discusses at length the feminist critiques of liberalism itself, including the charge advanced by Alison Jaggar that liberalism demands ethical egoism. Nussbaum notes that liberalism emphasizes respect for others as individuals, and further argues that Jaggar has elided the distinction between individualism and self-sufficiency. Nussbaum accepts Catharine MacKinnon's critique of abstract liberalism, assimilating the salience of history and context of group hierarchy and subordination, but concludes that this appeal is rooted in liberalism rather than a critique of it.

Nussbaum condemns the practice of female genital mutilation, citing deprivation of normative human functioning in its risks to health, impact on sexual functioning, violations of dignity, and conditions of non-autonomy. Emphasizing that female genital mutilation is carried out by brute force, its irreversibility, its non-consensual nature, and its links to customs of male domination, Nussbaum urges feminists to confront female genital mutilation as an issue of injustice.

Nussbaum also refines the concept of "objectification", as originally advanced by Catharine MacKinnon and Andrea Dworkin. Nussbaum defines the idea of treating as an object with seven qualities: instrumentality, denial of autonomy, inertness, fungibility, violability, ownership, and denial of subjectivity. Her characterization of pornography as a tool of objectification puts Nussbaum at odds with sex-positive feminism. At the same time, Nussbaum argues in support of the legalization of prostitution, a position she reiterated in a 2008 essay following the Spitzer scandal, writing: "The idea that we ought to penalize women with few choices by removing one of the ones they do have is grotesque."

Sex and Social Justice was highly praised by critics in the press. Salon declared: "She shows brilliantly how sex is used to deny some people—i.e., women and gay men—social justice." The New York Times praised the work as "elegantly written and carefully argued". Kathryn Trevenen praised Nussbaum's effort to shift feminist concerns toward interconnected transnational efforts, and for explicating a set of universal guidelines to structure an agenda of social justice. Patrick Hopkins singled out for praise Nussbaum's "masterful" chapter on sexual objectification. Radical feminist Andrea Dworkin faulted Nussbaum for "consistent over-intellectualization of emotion, which has the inevitable consequence of mistaking suffering for cruelty".

=== Hiding from Humanity ===
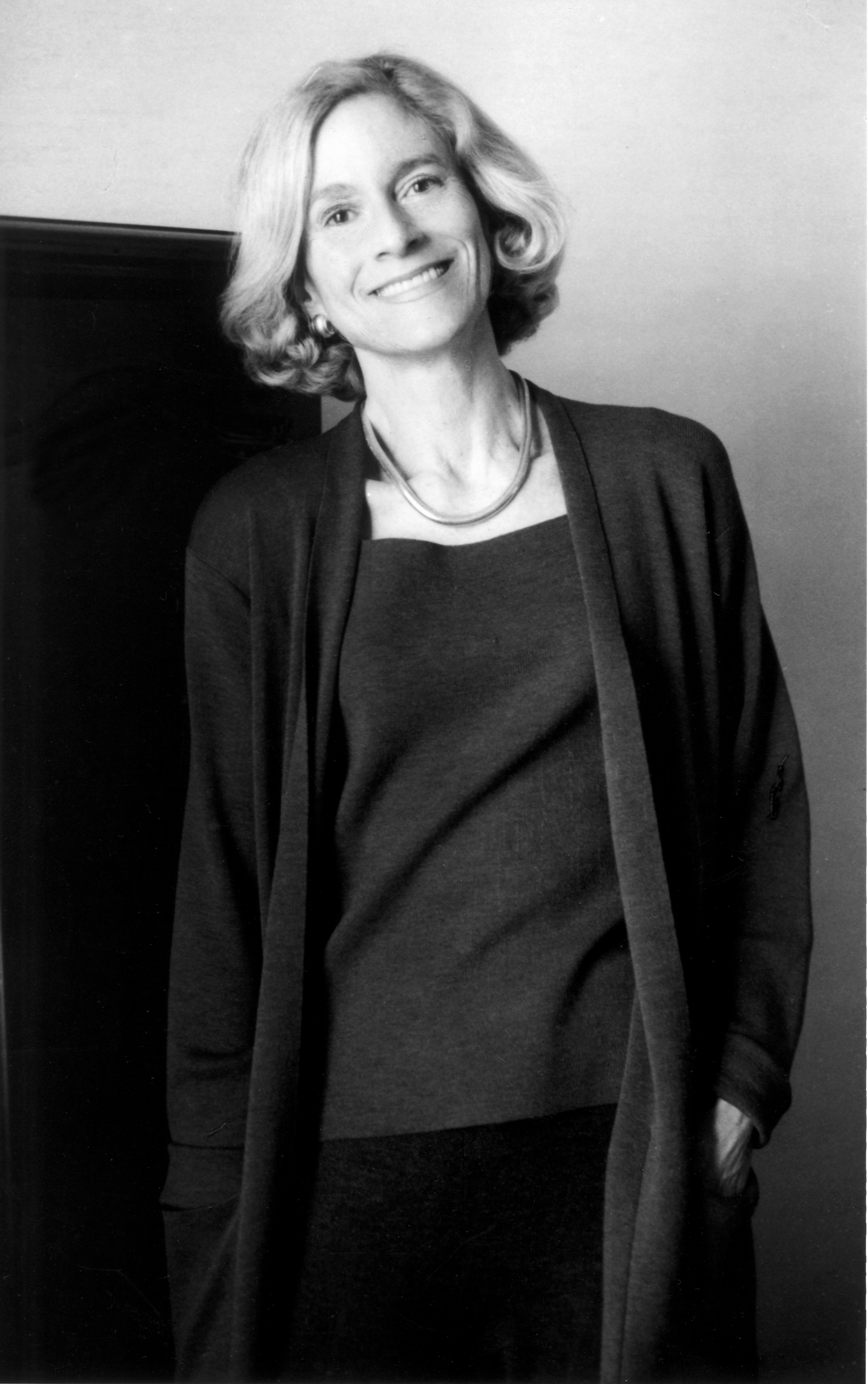
Nussbaum in 2004

Hiding from Humanity extends Nussbaum's work in moral psychology to probe the arguments for including two emotions—shame and disgust—as legitimate bases for legal judgments. Nussbaum argues that individuals tend to repudiate their bodily imperfection or animality through the projection of fears about contamination. This cognitive response is in itself irrational, because we cannot transcend the animality of our bodies. Noting how projective disgust has wrongly justified group subordination (mainly of women, Jews, and homosexuals), Nussbaum ultimately discards disgust as a reliable basis of judgment. In an interview with Reason, Nussbaum elaborated:

Disgust and shame are inherently hierarchical; they set up ranks and orders of human beings. They are also inherently connected with restrictions on liberty in areas of non-harmful conduct. For both of these reasons, I believe, anyone who cherishes the key democratic values of equality and liberty should be deeply suspicious of the appeal to those emotions in the context of law and public policy.

Nussbaum's work was received with wide praise. The Boston Globe called her argument "characteristically lucid" and hailed her as "America's most prominent philosopher of public life". Her reviews in national newspapers and magazines garnered unanimous praise. In academic circles, Stefanie A. Lindquist of Vanderbilt University lauded Nussbaum's analysis as a "remarkably wide ranging and nuanced treatise on the interplay between emotions and law".

A prominent exception was Roger Kimball's review published in The New Criterion, in which he accused Nussbaum of "fabricating" the renewed prevalence of shame and disgust in public discussions and says she intends to "undermine the inherited moral wisdom of millennia". He rebukes her for "contempt for the opinions of ordinary people" and ultimately accuses Nussbaum herself of "hiding from humanity". Nussbaum has recently drawn on and extended her work on disgust to produce a new analysis of the legal issues regarding sexual orientation and same-sex conduct. Her book From Disgust to Humanity: Sexual Orientation and the Constitution was published by Oxford University Press in 2009, as part of their "Inalienable Rights" series, edited by Geoffrey Stone.

=== From Disgust to Humanity ===
In her 2010 book From Disgust to Humanity: Sexual Orientation and Constitutional Law, Nussbaum analyzes the role that disgust plays in law and public debate in the United States. The book primarily analyzes constitutional legal issues facing gay and lesbian Americans but also analyzes issues such as anti-miscegenation statutes, segregation, antisemitism and the caste system in India as part of its broader thesis regarding the "politics of disgust". Nussbaum posits that the fundamental motivation of those advocating legal restrictions against gay and lesbian Americans is a "politics of disgust". These legal restrictions include blocking sexual orientation being protected under anti-discrimination laws (see Romer v. Evans), sodomy laws against consenting adults (see Lawrence v. Texas), and constitutional bans against same-sex marriage (see California Proposition 8 (2008)). Nussbaum also argues that legal bans on conducts, such as nude dancing in private clubs, nudity on private beaches, the possession and consumption of alcohol in seclusion, gambling in seclusion or in a private club, which remain on the books, partake of the politics of disgust and should be overturned.

Nussbaum identifies the "politics of disgust" closely with Lord Devlin and his famous opposition to the Wolfenden report, which recommended decriminalizing private consensual homosexual acts, on the basis that those things would "disgust the average man". To Devlin, the mere fact some people or act may produce popular emotional reactions of disgust provides an appropriate guide for legislating. She also identifies the 'wisdom of repugnance' as advocated by Leon Kass as another "politics of disgust" school of thought as it claims that disgust "in crucial cases ... repugnance is the emotional expression of deep wisdom, beyond reason's power fully to articulate it". Nussbaum goes on to explicitly oppose the concept of a disgust-based morality as an appropriate guide for legislating. Nussbaum notes that popular disgust has been used throughout history as a justification for persecution. Drawing upon her earlier work on the relationship between disgust and shame, Nussbaum notes that at various times, racism, antisemitism, and sexism, have all been driven by popular revulsion.

In place of this "politics of disgust", Nussbaum argues for the harm principle from John Stuart Mill as the proper basis for limiting individual liberties. Nussbaum argues the harm principle, which supports the legal ideas of consent, the age of majority, and privacy, protects citizens while the "politics of disgust" is merely an unreliable emotional reaction with no inherent wisdom. Furthermore, Nussbaum argues this "politics of disgust" has denied and continues to deny citizens humanity and equality before the law on no rational grounds and causes palpable social harms to the groups affected. From Disgust to Humanity earned acclaim from liberal American publications, and prompted interviews in The New York Times and other magazines. It was criticized by the conservative magazine The American Spectator.

=== Creating Capabilities ===
The book Creating Capabilities, first published in 2011, outlines a unique theory regarding the Capability approach or the Human development approach. Nussbaum draws on theories of other notable advocates of the Capability approach like Amartya Sen, but has a distinct approach. She proposes to choose a list of capabilities based on some aspects of John Rawls' concept of "central human capabilities."

Nussbaum's book combines ideas from the Capability approach, development economics, and distributive justice to substantiate a qualitative theory on capabilities. She criticizes existing economic indicators like GDP as failing to fully account for quality of life and assurance of basic needs, instead rewarding countries with large growth distributed highly unequally across the population. The book also aims to serve as an introduction to the Capability approach more generally; it is accessible to students and newcomers to the material because of the current lack of general knowledge about this approach. Finally, Nussbaum compares her approach with other popular approaches to human development and economic welfare, including Utilitarianism, Rawlsian Justice, and Welfarism in order to argue why the Capability approach should be prioritized by development economics policymakers.

== Awards and honors ==
=== Honorary degrees and honorary societies ===
Nussbaum is a member of the American Academy of Arts and Sciences (1988) and the American Philosophical Society (1996). She is an Academician in the Academy of Finland (2000) and a Corresponding Fellow of the British Academy (2008). She has 69 honorary degrees from colleges and universities across the US, Canada, Europe, Asia, and Latin America, including:

North America

- Harvard University, Massachusetts
- Carnegie Mellon University, Pennsylvania
- Knox College, Illinois
- Mount Holyoke College, Massachusetts
- Wabash College, Indiana
- Emory University, Georgia
- Grinnell College, Iowa
- Kenyon College, Ohio
- Williams College, Massachusetts
- Colgate University, New York
- Bucknell University, Pennsylvania
- The College of William and Mary, Virginia
- Lawrence University, Wisconsin
- The New School University, New York City
- The Ohio State University, Ohio
- The University of North Carolina at Asheville, North Carolina
- Concordia College, Minnesota
- Georgetown University, Washington, D.C.
- The University of Toronto, Canada
- McGill University, Canada
- Simon Fraser University, Canada

Europe

- The University of St Andrews, Scotland
- The University of Edinburgh, Scotland
- The Katholieke Universiteit Leuven, Belgium
- The University of Humanistic Studies, Utrecht, Netherlands
- The École Normale Supérieure, Paris, France
- Bielefeld University, Germany
- The Institute of Social Studies, Rotterdam, Netherlands
- Queen's University Belfast, Northern Ireland
- The University of Athens, Greece
- Dimitrie Cantemir Christian University, Bucharest, Romania

Middle East

- The University of Haifa, Israel
- The Hebrew University of Jerusalem, Israel

Africa

- The University of the Free State, South Africa

Latin America

- Pontifical Catholic University of Peru, Peru
- University of Antioquia, Colombia

Universidad de los Andes, Colombia

=== Awards ===
- 1990: Brandeis Creative Arts Award in Non-Fiction
- 1991: PEN/Diamonstein-Spielvogel Award for the Art of the Essay for Love's Knowledge
- 1998: Ness Book Award of the Association of American Colleges and Universities (Cultivating Humanity)
- 2000: Book award of the North American Society for Social Philosophy (Sex and Social Justice)
- 2002: University of Louisville Grawemeyer Award in Education (Cultivating Humanity)
- 2003: Barnard College Medal of Distinction
- 2004: Honorary membership into Phi Beta Kappa at the University of Chicago.
- 2004: Association of American University Publishers Professional and Scholarly Book Award for Law (Hiding From Humanity)
- 2005: listed among the world's Top 100 intellectuals by Foreign Policy (as well as in 2008 and 2010) and Prospect magazines.
- 2007: Radcliffe Alumnae Recognition Award
- 2009: American Philosophical Society's Henry M. Phillips Prize in Jurisprudence.
- 2009: Arts and Sciences Advocacy Award from the Council of Colleges of Arts and Sciences (CCAS). CCAS bestows this award upon an individual or organization demonstrating exemplary advocacy for the arts and sciences, flowing from a deep commitment to the intrinsic worth of liberal arts education.
- 2010: Centennial Medal of the Graduate School of Arts and Sciences, Harvard University
- 2012: Prince of Asturias Awards for Social Sciences
- 2014: John Locke Lectures at Oxford University.
- 2015: Premio Nonino, Italy
- 2015: Inamori Ethics Prize
- 2016: Kyoto Prize in Philosophy, Japan
- 2017: Jefferson Lecture
- 2017: Don M. Randel Award for Contribution to the Humanities, American Academy of Arts and Sciences
- 2018: Berggruen Prize
- 2021: Holberg Prize "for her groundbreaking contribution to research in philosophy, law and related fields"
- 2022: The Order of Lincoln the highest award for public service conferred by the State of Illinois
- 2022: The Balzan Prize for "her transformative reconception of the goals of social justice, both globally and locally".
- 2026: John W. Kluge Prize for Achievement in the Study of Humanity
- 2026: Prix de Principauté (Principality Prize of Monaco, presented jointly by Les Rencontres Philosophiques de Monaco and the Prince Pierre Foundation) for an entire body of work

== See also ==
- Aestheticization of politics
- American philosophy
- Instrumental and value rationality
- List of animal rights advocates
- List of American philosophers
- List of female philosophers
- Nikidion

Non-profit organization positions
Preceded by Amartya Sen	President of the Human Development and Capability Association; 2006–2008	Succeeded by Frances Stewart
Awards
Preceded by William G. Bowen	Grawemeyer Award for Education; 2002	Succeeded by Deborah Brandt
Preceded by Derek Bok	Grawemeyer Award for Education; 2002	Succeeded by Deborah Brandt
Preceded by Howard Gardner	Princess of Asturias Award for Social Sciences; 2012	Succeeded by Saskia Sassen
Preceded by John Neumeier	Kyoto Prize in Arts and Philosophy; 2016	Succeeded by Richard Taruskin
Preceded by The Baroness O'Neill of Bengarve	Berggruen Prize; 2018	Succeeded by Ruth Bader Ginsburg
