= Abbott Gleason =

American historian

Abbott Gleason (21 July 1938 – 25 December 2015) was professor emeritus of history and faculty member at the Watson Institute, Brown University. He graduated from Harvard University.

== Selected publications ==
- European and Muscovite: Ivan Kireevsky and the Origins of Slavophilism 1972
- Young Russia: The Genesis of Russian Radicalism in the 1860s 1980
- Totalitarianism: The Inner History of the Cold War 1995
- A Liberal Education 2010
