= Abbott House (childcare agency) =

Charity headquartered in Irvington, New York, US

- Formation: 1963
- Type: Charity
- Headquarters: Irvington, New York, U.S.

Abbott House is a community-based human services agency headquartered in Irvington, New York, established in 1963. While its main facility is in Irvington, Abbott House has offices in Manhattan and the Bronx, as well as Westchester, Dutchess and Orange, Sullivan counties. It serves homeless, neglected, abused, or developmentally disabled boys in grades 2 through 9, ages 7 through 17, and is a member of the Federation of Protestant Welfare Agencies. In 1992, Abbott House expanded its operations to include developmentally disabled adults as well.

As of 2010, the Abbott House residential facility houses around 60 boys, most of whom attend the Abbott School, but Abbott House provides services to around 1200 people not in residential custody. The Abbott School, the campus of which is located on the grounds of the Abbott House, is not part of the city's regular school district, but the Special Act school district called the "Abbott Union Free School District". The students of the Abbott School come from both the residential Abbott House facility, and as day students from community schools in Westchester, Rockland, and New York City.

== History ==
The main building of the Abbott House was previously a hospital called "Irvington House", which dealt primarily in the care of children with chronic maladies. Irvington House gradually began to shift away from providing solely medical care, to focusing on child welfare and child protection causes. In 1963, the hospital ceased to function as "Irvington House" and was incorporated as "Abbott House", and began providing services relating to foster care and adoptive placement.
