= Ward Hinckley House =

Historic house in Maine, United States

- U.S. National Register of Historic Places
- Location: Blue Hill, Maine
- Area: 1 acre (0.40 ha)
- Built: 1916
- Architect: Hinckley, Wallace
- Architectural style: Prairie School
- NRHP reference No.: 74000153
- Added to NRHP: December 16, 1974

The Ward Hinckley House is a historic house in Blue Hill, Maine. Built in 1916 for Otis Ward Hinckley, a Chicago businessman with roots in Blue Hill, it is one of only two documented examples of the Prairie School of architecture in the state of Maine. It was listed on the National Register of Historic Places in 1974.

== Description and history ==
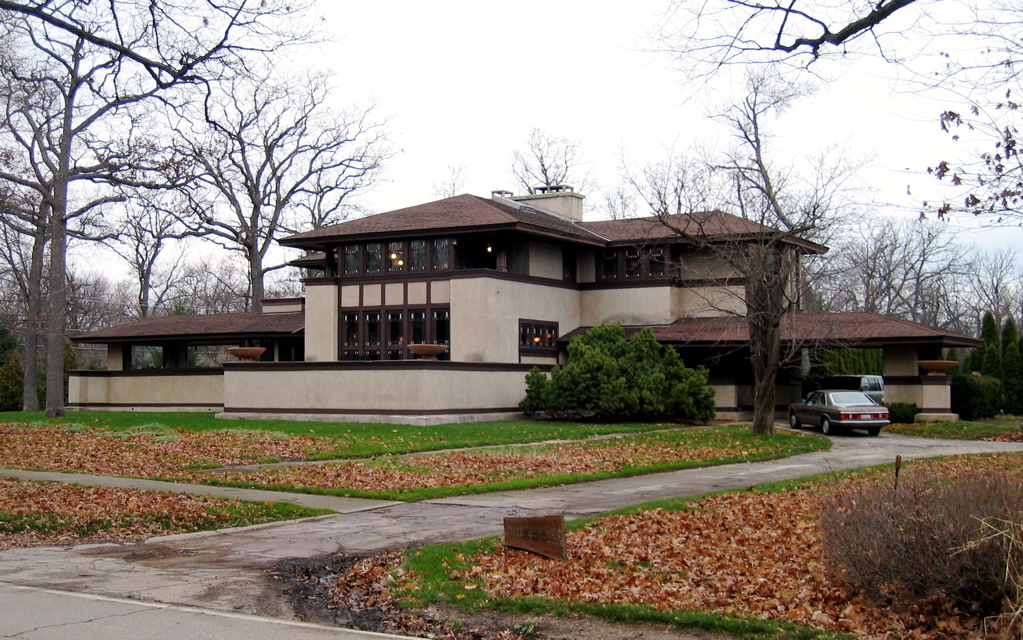
The Willits House in Highland Park, Illinois, designed by Frank Lloyd Wright and built in 1901. The Hinckley House is based on this work.

The Hinckley House is set on the coast of Blue Hill Harbor, an inlet of the Mount Desert Narrows, the body of water separating Blue Hill from Mount Desert Island. It is a two-story building with a hip roof that has extended eaves, and a long single-story projecting section on one side. It has groups of diamond-paned windows and a stuccoed exterior.

The house was built in 1916 for Otis Ward Hinckley, a Chicago businessman who was part owner of the Hinckley & Schmitt bottling company, and whose ancestors included Blue Hill native Rev. Jonathan Fisher. Hinckley was said to be aware of Frank Lloyd Wright's design work, and sought his services to design the house, but balked at Wright's price. Instead he hired his nephew Wallace Hinckley, who created this design based on Wright's Willits House in Highland Park, Illinois. The house remains in private ownership.

== See also ==
- National Register of Historic Places listings in Hancock County, Maine
