= Alice G. Schirmer =

American nurse and cookbook writer (1875–1935)

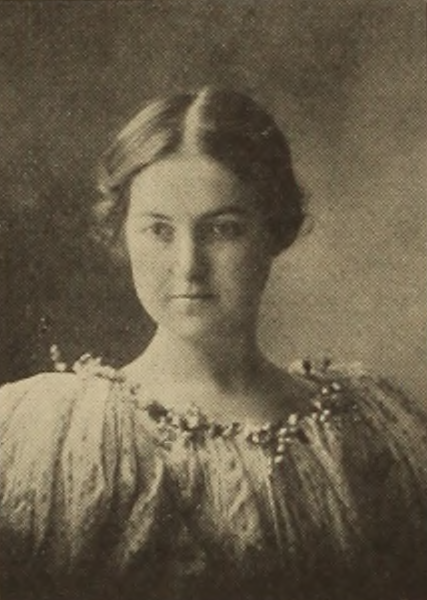
- Schirmer, c. 1897
- Born: Alice Phelps Goodwin; October 20, 1875; Lexington, Massachusetts, U.S.
- Died: May 21, 1935 (aged 59); Needham, Massachusetts, U.S.
- Resting place: Forest Hills Cemetery
- Education: Smith College (B.L., 1897); University of Berlin (1898–1899); Massachusetts Homeopathic Hospital (1903); Boston Floating Hospital (1904)
- Occupations: Nurse; cookbook writer
- Notable work: One Hundred Meatless Dishes (1914)
- Spouse: J. Walter Schirmer (m. 1908)
- Children: 2
- Relatives: H. B. Goodwin (stepgrandmother)

Alice Phelps Goodwin Schirmer (born Alice Phelps Goodwin; October 20, 1875 – May 21, 1935) was an American nurse and cookbook writer. A graduate of Smith College, she trained at the Massachusetts Homeopathic Hospital and completed postgraduate study at the Boston Floating Hospital. She worked as head nurse at the Medical Mission in Boston and as superintendent of nurses at the Boston Floating Hospital. Schirmer authored the vegetarian cookbook One Hundred Meatless Dishes (1914).

== Biography ==
=== Early life and education ===
Schirmer was born Alice Phelps Goodwin on October 20, 1875, in Lexington, Massachusetts, the daughter of Charles Clinton Goodwin (1839–1905) and Alice Dodge Goodwin (née Phelps; 1838–1906). She had an older brother and sister. Her maternal grandfather was the sea captain William Dane Phelps, and her paternal grandfather's second wife was the novelist H. B. Goodwin.

She graduated from Smith College in 1897 with a Bachelor of Letters. From 1898 to 1899, she studied at the University of Berlin. She graduated from the Massachusetts Homeopathic Hospital Training School for Nurses in 1903 and completed a postgraduate course at the Boston Floating Hospital in the summer of 1904.

=== Medical career ===
Schirmer served as head nurse at the Medical Mission in Boston from 1906 to 1907 and as superintendent of nurses at the Boston Floating Hospital from 1907 to 1908.

=== One Hundred Meatless Dishes ===
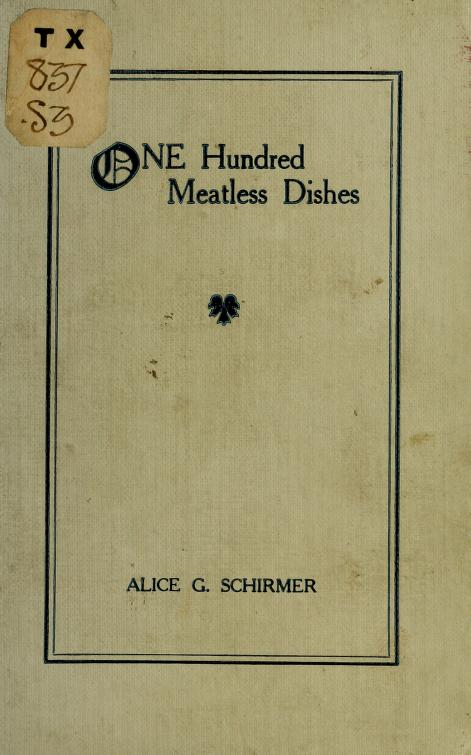
Cover of One Hundred Meatless Dishes, 1914

In 1914, Schirmer published the vegetarian cookbook One Hundred Meatless Dishes. The preface outlines five classes of foods, sections are introduced by quotations on vegetarianism, and the book includes sample menus. Its recipes include soups, meat substitutes, vegetable and nut dishes, salads, and desserts.

In 1915, a notice in The Boston Globe reported that a meatless dinner party had been held at a Boston hotel, and stated that Schirmer's book showed the possibilities for such a meal, including recipes and sample menus.

A second edition was published by Beacon Press in 1924. A notice of the new edition in The Starry Cross described it as an "excellent little vegetarian cook-book". In 1948, it was still being sold by the American Humane Education Society in Boston.

=== Personal life and death ===
Schirmer lived in Needham, Massachusetts, from 1908. She married Dr. J. Walter Schirmer of West Roxbury on September 24, 1908. They had two children, Louise (b. 1910) and John (b. 1914).

In January 1913, The New York Times reported that she and her husband had set out a daily routine and diet for Louise, then aged two and a half, including a meat-free diet and regular outdoor rest on a veranda during cold weather. In 1922, John died in a car accident at age eight.

Schirmer was a member of the Smith College Alumnae Association. She was a charter member of the New Century Club and served as a counsellor on the women's committee of the Norfolk County Agricultural School in Walpole, Massachusetts.

Schirmer died on May 21, 1935, at her home in Needham, after an illness lasting 24 hours. Her funeral was held on May 24, conducted by Clarence Skinner, dean of the Crane School of Theology at Tufts University, and she was cremated at Forest Hills Cemetery, Boston. In her will, she bequeathed US$5,000 to Smith College.

== Reception and legacy ==
Schirmer was included in Woman's Who's Who of America: A Biographical Dictionary of Contemporary Women of the United States and Canada, 1914–1915.

Her cookbook One Hundred Meatless Dishes has been listed in bibliographies including Lavonne B. Axford's English Language Cookbooks, 1600-1973, Judith C. Dyer's Vegetarianism: An Annotated Bibliography, and History of Vegetarianism and Veganism Worldwide (1430 BCE to 1969) by Akiko Aoyagi and William Shurtleff. A digitized edition is held by the Library of Congress.

== Publications ==
- One Hundred Meatless Dishes (1st ed.). Needham, Mass.: The Chronicle Press. 1914.
- One Hundred Meatless Dishes (2nd ed.). Boston: Beacon Press. 1924.
