= Merrill Hall =

- U.S. National Register of Historic Places
- U.S. Historic district – Contributing property
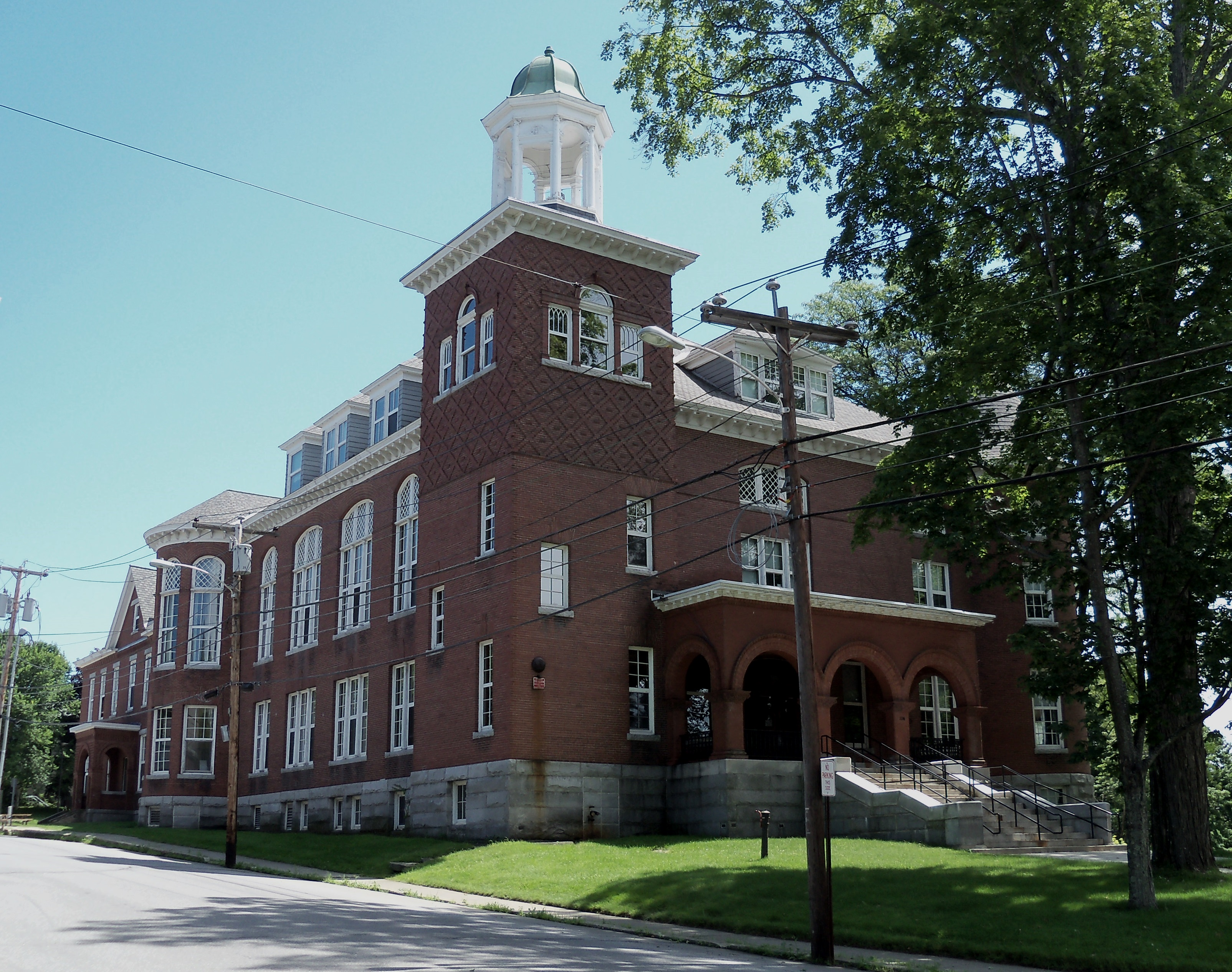

- Location within Maine Location within the United States
- Location: Maine and Academy Sts., Farmington, Maine
- Coordinates: 44°40′9″N 70°8′58″W
- Area: 1 acre (0.40 ha)
- Built: 1888
- Architect: George M. Coombs
- Architectural style: Romanesque, Romanesque Revival
- Part of: Farmington Historic District (ID94001551)
- NRHP reference No.: 80000217

Significant dates
- Added to NRHP: January 23, 1980
- Designated CP: January 20, 1995

Merrill Hall, located at Main and Academy Streets in Farmington, Maine, is the oldest building on the campus of the University of Maine at Farmington. It was designed by George M. Coombs of Lewiston and built in 1898, replacing the school's original 1864 building, but includes an ell dating to 1888. It was listed on the National Register of Historic Places in 1980. It currently houses administrative offices of the university.

== Architecture and history ==
Merrill Hall is set on a rise facing Farmington's Main Street to the west, just south of the town's central business district. It is a Romanesque Revival building 2-1/2 stories in height, constructed of brick with granite and wood trim. Its main facade is asymmetrically arranged, with a low round tower to the right, and a taller square tower to the left, the latter topped by a belfry and octagonal bellcast roof. The main entrance lies between them sheltered by a deep porch with three round arches. To the rear of the building is an attached 2-1/2 story brick ell, which predates the construction of the main block.

The University of Maine at Farmington was established as the "Western State Normal School" in 1864 as the state's first publicly funded normal school. It was originally housed in the old wood-frame Farmington Academy building, to which the present rear ell was added in 1888. Demand for space and the deteriorating condition of the old academy building prompted its demolition in 1897, followed by the construction of the main building in 1898. The architect was George M. Coombs of Lewiston, a prominent architect who also designed many buildings in downtown Farmingtion and elsewhere in Maine.

The normal school was formally merged into the University of Maine system in 1971. Merrill Hall now houses space for the performing and visual arts.

== See also ==
- National Register of Historic Places listings in Franklin County, Maine
