= John Nathan Levine =

American football player and coach (1881–1950)

John Levine
Biographical details
- Born: January 19, 1881; Poland
- Died: January 6, 1950 (aged 68); Farmington, Maine, U.S.

Playing career
- 1902: Colby
- 1903–1906: Yale

Coaching career (HC unless noted)
- 1908: Davidson
- 1909–1911: Transylvania

Administrative career (AD unless noted)
- 1909–1911: Transylvania

Head coaching record
- Overall: 12–16–5

John Nathan "Dutch" Levine (January 19, 1881 – January 6, 1950) was an American college football player and coach. He served as the head football coach at Davidson College in 1908 and at Transylvania University from 1909 to 1911, compiling a career coaching record of 12–16–5.

Levine moved from Great Neck, New York to Farmington, Maine in 1949. He died at his home there, on January 6, 1950.

== Head coaching record ==
Year	Team	Overall	Conference	Standing	Bowl/playoffs
Davidson (Independent) (1908)
1908	Davidson	5–3–1			
Davidson:		5–3–1			
Transylvania Crimsons (Independent) (1909–1911)
1909	Transylvania	1–5–3			
1910	Transylvania	3–4			
1911	Transylvania	3–4–1			
Transylvania:		7–13–4			
Total:		12–16–5			
