= Franklin County Courthouse (Maine) =

- U.S. National Register of Historic Places
- U.S. Historic district – Contributing property
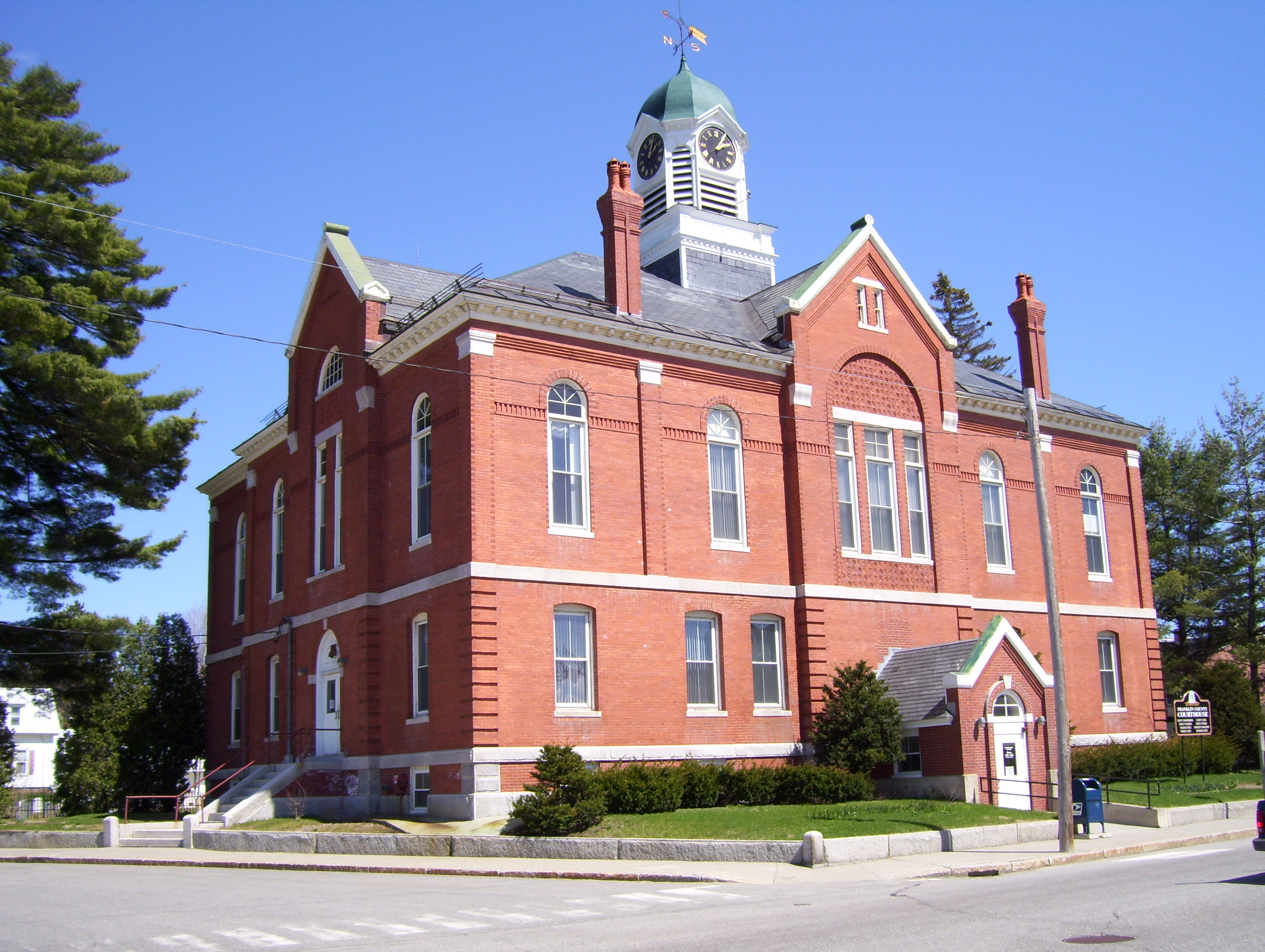

- Location within Maine Location within the United States
- Interactive map showing the location for Franklin County Courthouse
- Location: Farmington, Maine
- Coordinates: 44°40′17″N 70°9′8″W
- Area: less than one acre
- Built: 1885
- Architect: George M. Coombs
- Architectural style: Romanesque Revival/Queen Anne
- Part of: Farmington Historic District (ID94001551)
- NRHP reference No.: 83003641

Significant dates
- Added to NRHP: 1983
- Designated CP: January 20, 1995

The Franklin County Courthouse is a courthouse located in Farmington, Maine, the county seat of Franklin County. The 1885 courthouse represents a sophisticated design by George M. Coombs, with an addition in 1917 by Coombs' son, Harry Coombs. The building, the county's first purpose-built courthouse, was listed on the National Register of Historic Places in 1983.

== Architecture ==
The courthouse is set in a small park just on the northern edge of Farmington's central business district, bounded by Main, Anson, Cony, and Church Streets. It is a 3 1/2-story red-brick structure, roughly rectangular in shape, with high-style Victorian Italianate features. It has a hip roof which is crowned by a small square tower with a louvered ventilator, clock, and metal dome with weathervane. Each of three facades has a central pavilion which projects slightly and is topped by a gable section. The corners of the pavilions and the building have brick quoining on the first level, with pilasters at the building corners and between the bays on the elongated second level.

Farmington was designated the seat of Franklin County in 1838. The county court first met in a converted meeting house, which also housed town offices. This courthouse was built in 1885 on the site of this first building, to a design by the prolific and noted Lewiston architect George M. Coombs. Coombs designed a number of buildings in Farmington, particularly in the wake of a major fire that swept through the town in the 1880s. The annex to the courthouse was designed by his son Harry and completed in 1917.

== Significance ==
The Victorian-Italianate Queen Anne block portrays the work of one of George M. Coombs of Lewiston, one of Maine's leading architects.

Born in Brunswick, Maine, M. Coombs (1852-1909) moved to Lewiston in 1871 to join the office of William H. Stevens as an apprentice. William H. Stevens was an architect and civil engineer. Within a short time Coombs became a member of the firm; afterwards, the firm was renamed as Stevens and Coombs. After the death of Stevens, Coombs succeeded as senior partner. Subsequently Mr. Coombs, taking two former students as partners, started the firm of Coombs, Gibbs and Wilkinson.

Mr. Coombs is noted on the National Register for numerous structures which he designed including the Holman Day, Cushman and William P. Frye Houses, the Kora Shrine Temple, the Dominican Block, the Roak Block, The Lewiston Public Library, and the Oak Street School. He is gone but he is known as the architect of the original Poland Spring House.

Interestingly, the courthouse annex which was built in 1917, was designed by his son, Harry S. Coombs.

== See also ==
- National Register of Historic Places listings in Franklin County, Maine
