= Cutler Memorial Library =

- U.S. National Register of Historic Places
- U.S. Historic district – Contributing property
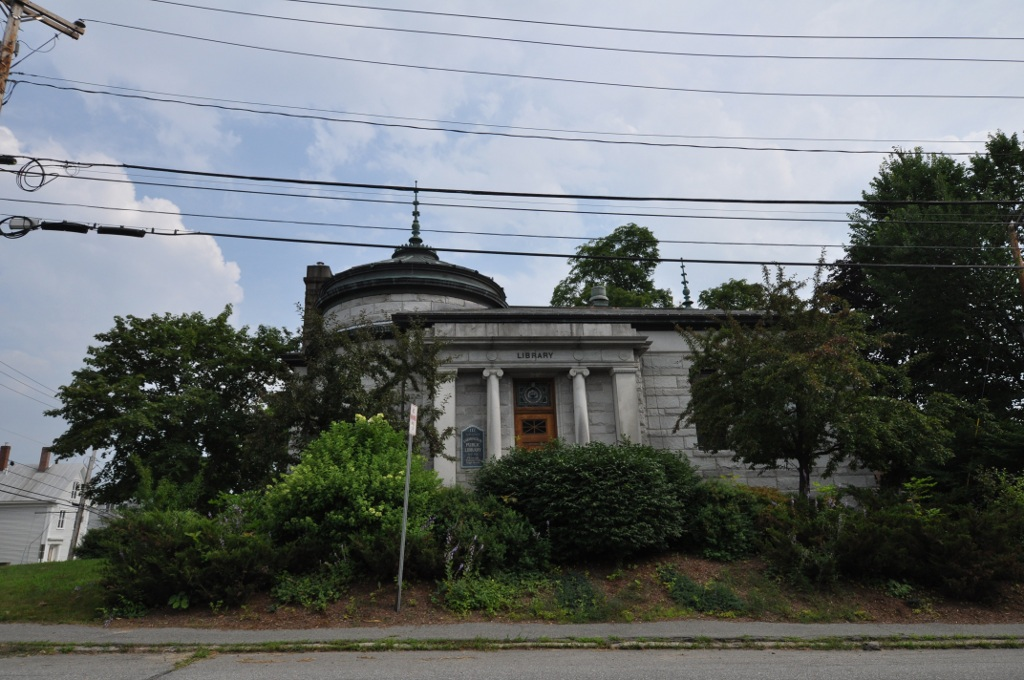

- Location within Maine Location within the United States
- Location: Academy and High Streets, Farmington, Maine
- Coordinates: 44°40′9″N 70°8′55″W
- Area: 1 acre (0.40 ha)
- Built: 1901-03
- Architect: William R. Miller
- Architectural style: Beaux Arts
- Part of: Farmington Historic District (ID94001551)
- NRHP reference No.: 73000104

Significant dates
- Added to NRHP: November 2, 1973
- Designated CP: January 20, 1995

The Cutler Memorial Library building houses the public library of Farmington, Maine. It is located at 117 Academy Street (corner of High Street), between the downtown area and the campus of the University of Maine at Farmington. Its building, dedicated to the memory of Nathan Cutler, was built in 1901-03 as the town's first dedicated library building, and was added to the National Register of Historic Places in 1973.

== Architecture ==
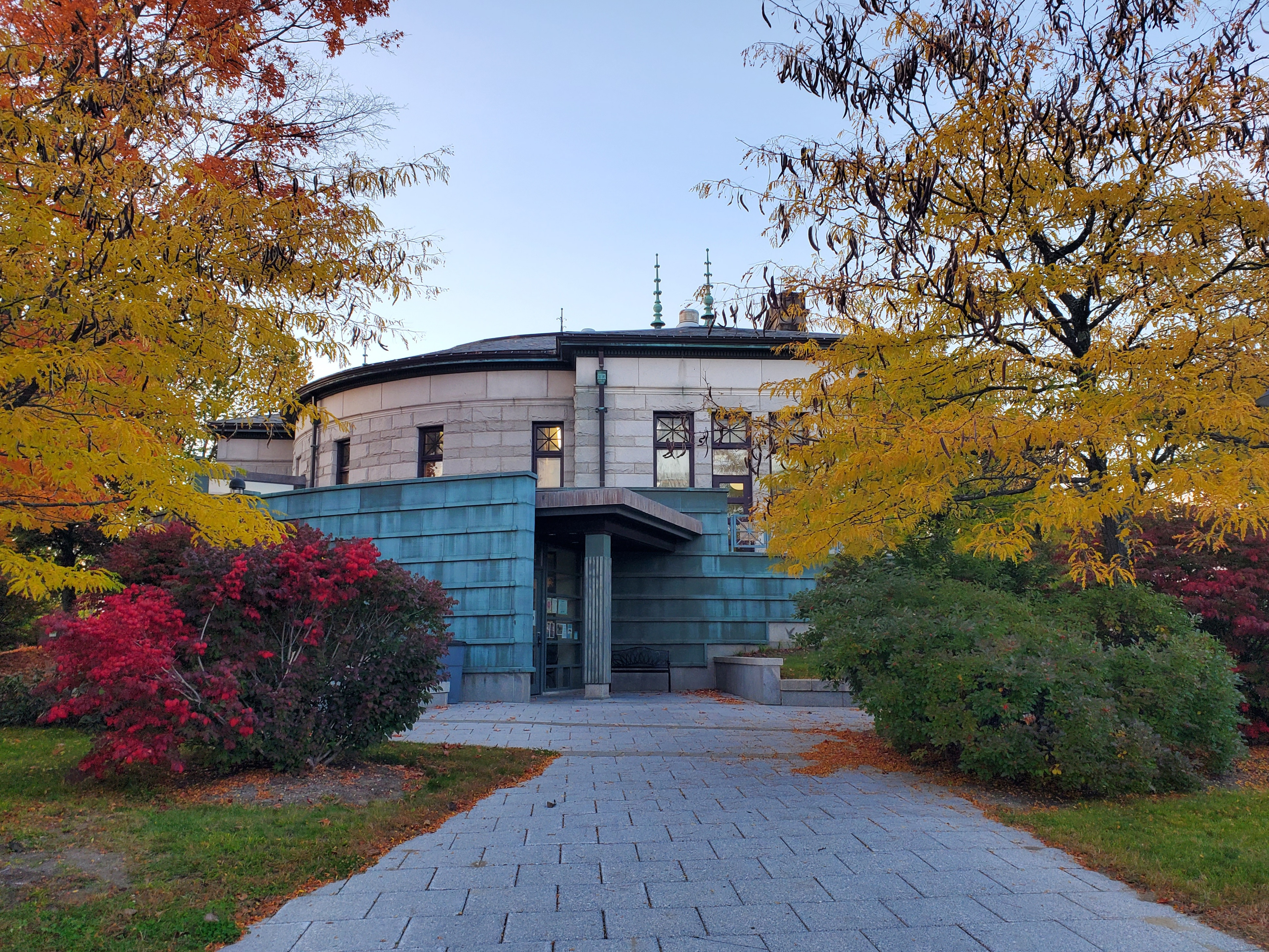
Lobby entrance to the Farmington Public (Cutler Memorial) Library in Maine.

The library building is a small Beaux Arts stone structure, designed by Auburn architect William R. Miller and built in 1901–03. The exterior is made of granite quarried in North Jay, Maine. It is a basically L-shaped building, with its long sides facing Academy and High Streets, joined at the corner by a low circular tower with a low-pitch conical roof and spire. The original entrance, facing Academy Street, has a recessed wooden door flanked by Doric columns, with Ionic pilasters at the outside of the recessed area. The interior of the library has retained much of its original woodwork, including particularly elegant arches, pilasters, and molding in the tower section. A new lobby area was added to the building in 2000, designed by Richard Burt.

== History ==
The first library association was established in Farmington in 1865 as a subscription service for its shareholders. This organization failed in 1880, and in 1890 the Farmington Public Library Association was formed, renting space in the local Masonic hall. Founders of this association included John and Isaac Cutler, the latter of whom donated the funds for the construction of this building, which is named in honor of his father Nathan.

== Significance ==
Franklin County’s first public library was established in 1845 at Keith’s Mills, currently a part of Chesterville. Some other libraries were constructed after that and the library in Farmington, the subject of this nomination, was one of them.

The Farmington Library Association was founded in 1865 and shares were sold to subscribers at $10.00 a share. The main portion of the library’s collection was the books that belonged to the old Philomathean Society. It is a reading group that has ceased to exist.

The Farmington Library Association was inoperative in 1880 but it was the forerunner of the current Farmington Public Library Association founded in 1890 with George C. Purington as its first president. The association voted to rent Room 6 in the Masonic Building as its headquarters in the fall. The rent of that room was $50.00 a year then. The library officially started its journey on February 14, 1891with Miss Mittie Fairbanks as librarian.

Two of the founding members were John L. and Isaac M. Cutler. Isaac made the first donation of 500 USD to the library in 1890. Mr. Purington recommended to Isaac Cutler a permanent memorial to his father, the Honorable Nathan Cutler. Isaac permitted the plans for submission with no regard to cost.

Dr. E.G. Merrill owned the selected site. His house was moved to the south side of Middle Street where it stands till date.

William R. Miller was the architect, he was a notable late nineteenth and early twentieth century Maine architect. He was born in 1866 in Durham, Maine. William R. Miller went to Bates College in Lewiston 2 years before specializing in architecture at M.I.T.. Prior to opening his office in Auburn, Miller studied in Europe for a year. He designed numerous public buildings and residences in Auburn and in its adjoining city of Lewiston. Afterward, moving his operations to Portland, Miller formed the firm of Miller and Beal. At the end of an active architectural career in Maine, William R. Miller died there in December 1929 at the age of 66.

The Cutler Memorial Library’s gray granite came from the Maine and New Hampshire Granite Company quarries in North Jay. Vermont green slate was used on the roof. The polished oak woodwork of the interior was done by Joseph Matthew of Farmington, and the stonework was done by Horace Purington & Co. D.H. Currier of Chesterville did the foundation.

The Cutler Memorial Library beautifies the center of Farmington and is situated as a memorial to the Hon. Nathan Cutler and the citizens of Farmington who realized the dream of a permanent library come true.

== See also ==
- National Register of Historic Places listings in Franklin County, Maine
