= Benjamin Vaughan Abbott =

American lawyer and author

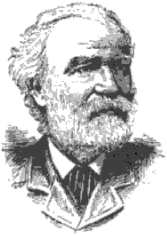
- Born: June 4, 1830; Boston, Massachusetts, U.S.
- Died: February 17, 1890 (aged 59); Brooklyn, New York, U.S.
- Resting place: Green-Wood Cemetery
- Education: New York University; Harvard Law School
- Occupations: Lawyer, novelist
- Father: Jacob Abbott (1803–1879)
- Relatives: Edward Abbott (brother); Austin Abbott (brother); Lyman Abbott (brother)

Benjamin Vaughan Abbott (June 4, 1830 – February 17, 1890) was an American lawyer and writer noted for his efforts in drawing up the New York penal code.

== Early life ==
On June 4, 1830, Abbott was born in Boston, Massachusetts. Abbott's father was Jacob Abbott, an author of children's books. Abbott's mother was Harriett Vaughan Abbott. Abbott's grandfather was also Jacob Abbott. Abbott's siblings are Edward Abbott, Austin Abbott and Lyman Abbott.

== Education ==
Abbott graduated from New York University in 1850, and Harvard Law School in 1852.

== Career ==
He practiced law for a number of years in New York, and became a partner in the firm Abbott Bros. with his brother Austin Abbott. He was the secretary of the New York Code Commission, which drew up the state's penal code in 1864. He also served on a commission created to revise the statutes of the United States from 1870 to 1872. He died in Brooklyn, N.Y., on February 17, 1890.

He is the author of several books, including the following novels:

- Come Cut Corners: The Experiences of a Conservative Family in Fanatical Times, 1855 (with Austin Abbott), and
- Matthew Caraby (with brother, under the pseudonym Beanauly).

His non-fiction works include:

- Abbott's Reports of Practice Cases in the Courts of the State of New York, 1855 (with Austin Abbott),
- Reports of cases in Admiralty, United States District Court for Southern New York, 1847–1850, 1857,
- A Collection of Forms of Practice and Pleading in Action, 1858,
- Digest of New York Statutes and Reports, 5 volumes, 1860,
- A Collection of Forms of Practice and Pleading in Actions, 1864,
- The Clerk's and Conveyancer's Assistant, 1866,
- Digest of the Reports of the United States Courts and Acts of Congress, 4 volumes, 1867,
- General Digest of the Law of Corporations, 1869,
- Digest of Reports of Indiana to the Year 1871,
- Reports of Decisions Rendered in the Circuit and District Courts of the United States, 1863–1871, 2 volumes, 1870–1871,
- United States Digest, 14 volumes, 1879,
- Dictionary of Terms and Phrases used in American or English Jurisprudence, 1879,
- General Digest of English and American Cases on the Law of Corporations, 1868–1878, 1879,
- Judge and Jury: A Popular Explanation of Leading Topics in the Law of the Land, 1880,
- National Digest, 4 volumes, 1884, containing court decisions of the year 1884, with a later supplement published in 1889,
- 1884: The Patent Laws of All Nations, 2 volumes, 1886, and
- Decisions on the Law of Patents for Inventions, English Cases, 1662–1843, 3 volumes, 1887.

== Personal life ==
In 1853, Abbott married Elizabeth, daughter of John Titcomb. Abbott had two children. On February 17, 1890, Abbott died in Brooklyn, New York, U.S. Abbott is buried in Green-Wood Cemetery in Brooklyn.
