= Farmington Historic District (Farmington, Maine) =

Historic district in Maine, United States

- U.S. National Register of Historic Places
- U.S. Historic district
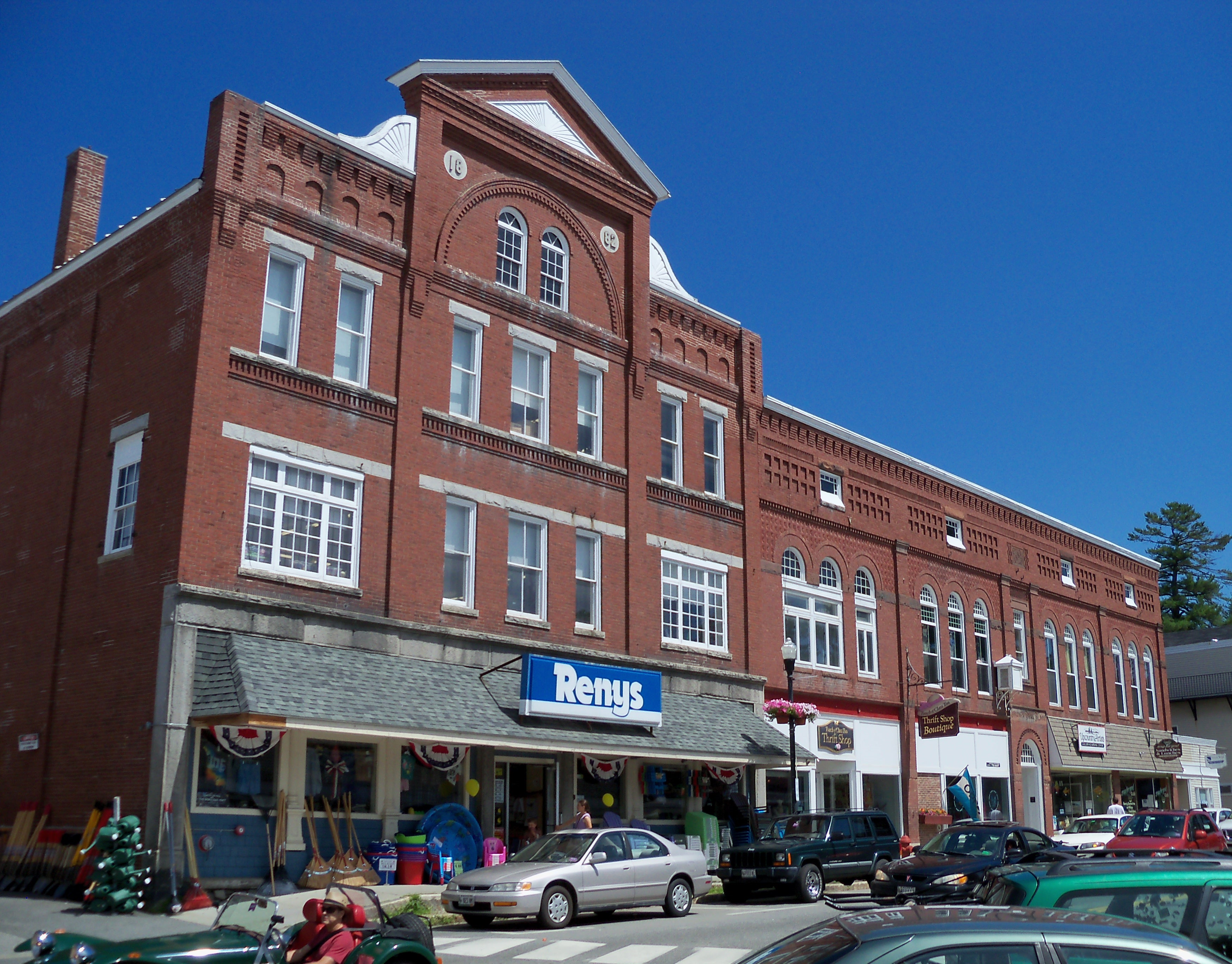

- Location within Maine Location within the United States
- Location: Roughly bounded by High, Academy, Anson and Grove Sts., Farmington, Maine
- Area: 85 acres (34 ha)
- Built: 1875
- Architect: George M. Coombs; Edwin E. Lewis
- Architectural style: Romanesque, Queen Anne, Italianate
- NRHP reference No.: 94001551

Significant dates
- Added to NRHP: January 20, 1995
- Boundary decrease: April 27, 2010

The Farmington Historic District encompasses much of the main central business district of Farmington, Maine. Farmington was settled in the 1770s, and experienced its most rapid growth after being named the shire town (county seat) of Franklin County in 1838, with a secondary spurt of redevelopment after a major fire in the 1880s. Its central business district encompasses many of the town's historic resources, and its most significant commercial and civic architecture. The district, which includes more than 130 resource over 85 acres (34 ha), was listed on the National Register of Historic Places in 1995.

== Description and history ==
The Farmington Historic District is primarily laid out along a stretch of Main Street, extending roughly between Belcher Road in the north and the junction of Main and Prescott Streets in the south. It also includes High Street between Middle and Anson Streets, and extends eastward along Broadway, Court and Orchards Streets. This area includes substantially all of the historic elements of the town's central business district, while excluding most of the campus of the University of Maine at Farmington, which lies just to the south on High and Main.

The center of the central business district is at the junction of Main Street and Broadway. Blocks to the north, south, and east are lined with brick commercial buildings. The Franklin County Courthouse lies one block north of this intersection, between Church and Anson Streets, and is one of several buildings designed by noted Maine architect George Coombs. The areas north and east of these blocks give way to more residential structures, with a few churches on High Street and near the southern end of the district on Main Street. Notable civic buildings in the district, besides the county courts, include town hall and the Cutler Memorial Library, a Beaux Arts structure built in early 20th century.

Greenacre, which stands high above Court Street, is probably the town's finest Italianate mansion. "Fewacres", the home of noted juvenile fiction writer Jacob Abbott, was originally part of the district, but was demolished c. 2010. Churches of interest include the First Congregational Church, United Church of Christ, and the former Free Will Baptist Church, which is now a garage at 219 Main Street.

== See also ==
- National Register of Historic Places listings in Franklin County, Maine
