= Chester Greenwood =

American inventor (1858–1937)

- Born: Chester Greenwood; December 4, 1858; Farmington, Maine
- Died: July 5, 1937 (aged 78); Farmington, Maine
- Education: Public Farmington, ME schools and Wilton, ME Academy
- Spouse: Sarah Isabel (Whittier) Greenwood
- Children: Lester Clyde Greenwood, Donald Whittier Greenwood, Vodisa Emilie (Greenwood) Magoon, Clinton Whittier Greenwood
- Parent(s): Zina Hyde Greenwood (father), and Emily Merrill (Fellows) Greenwood (mother)
- Engineering career
- Projects: Earmuffs

Chester Greenwood (December 4, 1858 – July 5, 1937) was an American engineer and inventor, known for inventing the earmuffs in 1873. He reportedly came up with the idea while ice skating and asked his grandmother to sew tufts of fur between loops of wire. His patent was for improved ear protectors. He manufactured these ear protectors in the Farmington, Maine, area for nearly 60 years.

== Life and career ==
In 1873, aged 15, while he was testing a new pair of ice skates, he got frustrated trying to protect his ears from the cold. He then wrapped his head with a scarf, but it was too itchy to wear. Greenwood was allergic to wool, so neither the scarves nor the wool hats available at the time were viable options for him as protective head coverings. Later, he designed two ear-shaped loops made by wire. He then asked his grandmother to sew fur on the loops. It successfully kept the cold away from his ears. He later improved the prototype earmuffs using a steel band which held them in place and named these earmuffs "Greenwood's Champion Ear Protectors".

Greenwood also patented a tea kettle, a variation of the steel-toothed rake, an advertising matchbox, and a machine used to produce wooden spools for wire and thread. He invented, but did not patent, an umbrella holder for mail carriers. The total number of patents Greenwood held is contested.

In addition to being an inventor, Greenwood was the owner of a bicycle business and a heating system business. He also introduced one of the first telephone systems in Farmington. He was an accomplished machinist and a business developer. His wife, Isabel (née Whittier), was a supporter of women's suffrage. They had four children.

== Legacy ==
In 1977, the State of Maine declared December 21 to be Chester Greenwood Day. Farmington, Maine, celebrates Chester Greenwood Day with a parade on the first Saturday of December.

The Isabel and Chester Greenwood House in Farmington is listed on the National Register of Historic Places.

In 2023, Three Brothers Theatre in Waukegan, Illinois, produced The Meaningful Action Theatre Company Presents A Workshop Reading Of "Muffed: A Recounting Of Farmington, Maine's 43rd Annual Chester Greenwood Day Devised By The Members Of The Meaningful Action Theatre Company" by Zack Peercy. The play follows a fictional theatre ensemble's attempt to devise a play about Farmington's Chester Greenwood Day celebrations. In 2025, it was also put on by The Factory Theater in Chicago and Prologue Theatre in Arlington County, Virginia.
