= Edward Abbott (priest) =

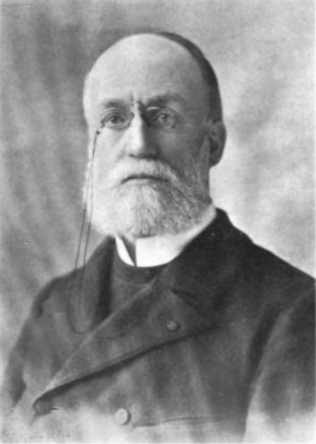
- Born: July 15, 1841; Farmington, Maine, U.S.
- Died: April 5, 1908 (aged 66); Boston, Massachusetts, U.S.
- Resting place: Pine Grove Cemetery in Brunswick, Maine, U.S.
- Education: New York University; Andover Theological Seminary
- Occupations: Minister, priest, journalist, author
- Spouses: Clara E. Davis (m. 1865) Katharine Kelly (m. 1883)
- Parents: Jacob Abbott (father); Harriet Vaughan (mother)

Edward Abbott (July 15, 1841 – April 5, 1908) was an American minister (later priest), journalist, and author.

== Early life ==
On July 15, 1841, Abbott was born in Farmington, Maine, fourth son of Jacob Abbott (1803-1879) and Harriet (Vaughan) Abbott.

== Education ==
Abbott graduated in 1860 at the New York University, being class poet, prophet, marshal, and editor of the Eucleian, also studied theology from 1861 to 1862 at the Andover Theological Seminary, and in 1863 served in the United States Sanitary Commission at Washington with the Army of the Potomac.

His degrees were conferred by the University of the City of New York, A.B., 1860, and D.D. in 1890.

== Career ==
Abbott was ordained in 1863 to the Congregational ministry, and was the first pastor of Pilgrim Congregational Church (then Stearns chapel) at Cambridge, Massachusetts, serving from 1865 to 1869. From 1869 to 1878 he was associate editor of The Congregationalist, and from 1878 to 1888 editor of the Literary World, whose direction he again assumed in 1895, continuing with that periodical until 1903. In 1879 he was ordained a deacon of the Protestant Episcopal Church, he was advanced to the priesthood in 1880 and became rector of St. James's parish, Cambridge.

In 1889 was elected by the general convention as bishop to Japan, but declined to serve. He was a member of the Cambridge school committee, chaplain of the Massachusetts Senate from 1872 to 1873, member of the board of visitors of Wellesley College 1884, vice-dean of the eastern convocation of Massachusetts, 1889, member of the missionary council of the P. E. church after 1886, and clerical deputy from Massachusetts to the general convention in 1892.

== Works ==
Besides contributions to American periodicals, his publications include:

- The Baby's Things, a story in verse (1871)
- Pilgrim Lesson Papers (1873-1874)
- The Conversations of Genius (1875)
- A Paragraph History of the United States (1875)
- A Paragraph History of the American Revolution (1876)
- Revolutionary Times (1876)
- Long-Look Books, 3 volumes (1877-1880)
- Memoir of Jacob Abbott in "Memorial Edition of Young Christian" (1882)
- Phillips Brooks (1900)

== Family ==
He was married, February 16, 1865, to Clara E. Davis, and August 21, 1883, to Katharine, daughter of Alfred Kelly.

He died at the Homeopathic Hospital in Boston on April 5, 1908.
