= Thomas Parker (Maine judge) =

American judge

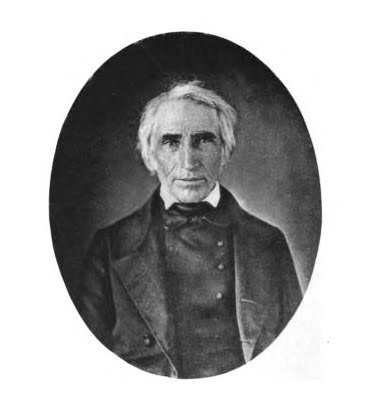
Judge Thomas Parker, donor of Parker Hall at Bates College

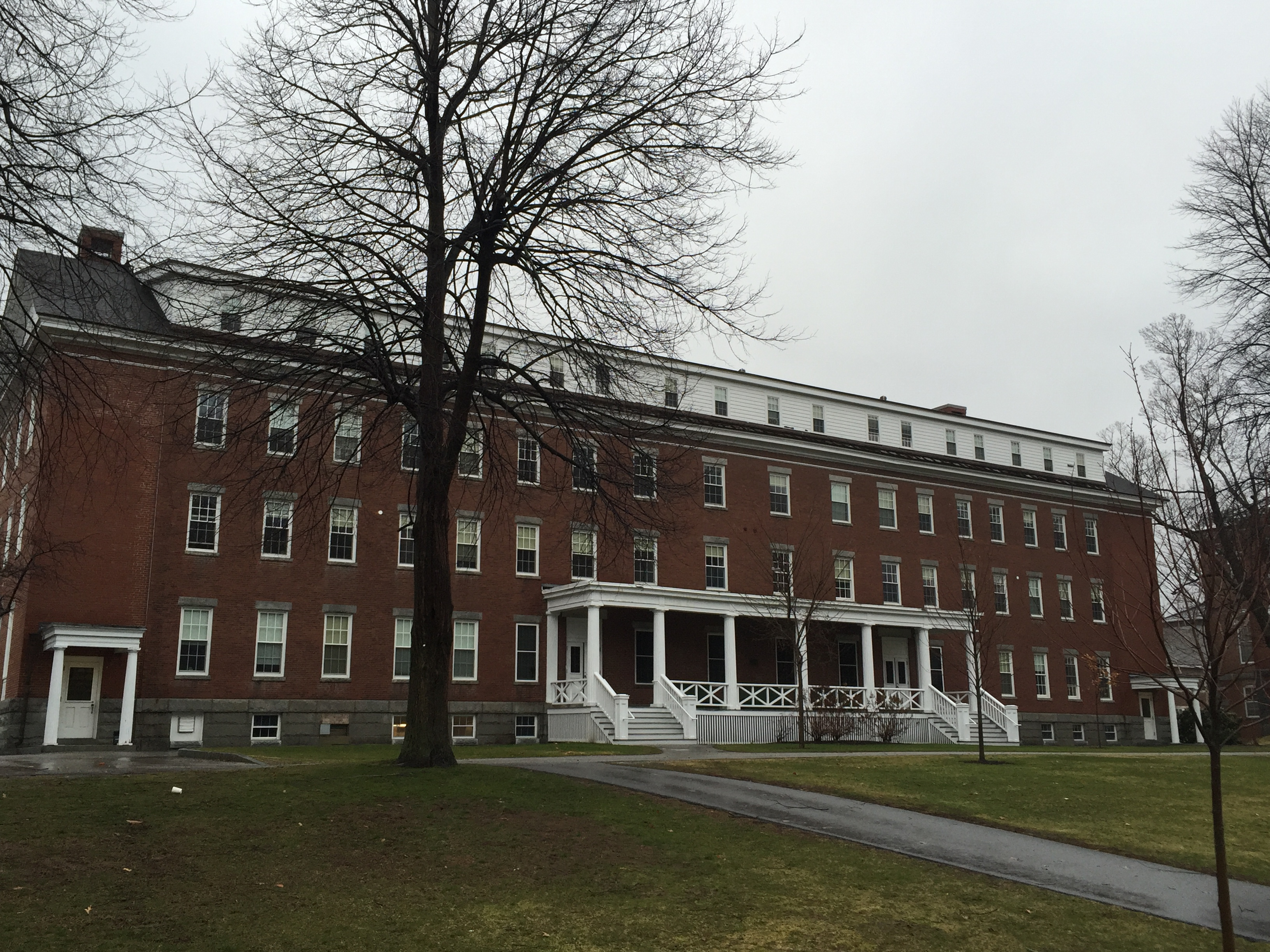
Parker Hall at Bates College was named in Judge Parker's honor

Thomas Parker (1783–1860) was a judge, writer, and philanthropist from Maine, who is the namesake of Parker Hall at Bates College.

Parker was born in 1783 in Edgartown, Massachusetts but moved to Farmington, Maine as a child with his father, Elvation Parker, and eventually worked for a period as a stonemason. In 1807 he married Judith Thomas. Parker served as a County Commissioner for several years and in 1838 Governor Edward Kent appointed Parker to be a probate judge from Franklin County where he served until 1845.

Parker later carried on extensive business in the probate courts. In 1846 Parker published a book on the History of Farmington Maine.

In 1856 he donated $5,000 to Bates College then called the Maine State Seminary, and Parker Hall at Bates is named in his honor.

He died in 1860.
