= The Fortunes of Miss Follen =

1876 novel by Mrs. Goodwin-Talcott

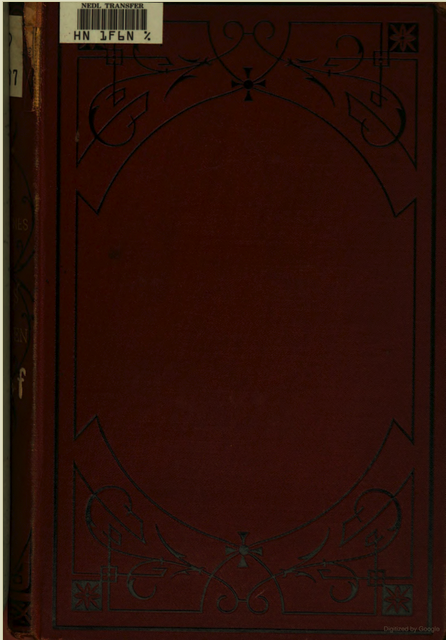
- First edition cover
- Author: Mrs. Goodwin-Talcott
- Language: English
- Genre: Romance novel
- Set in: Rhineland
- Publisher: D. Appleton & Company
- Publication date: 1876
- Publication place: United States
- Pages: 270
- Followed by: Christine's fortune

The Fortunes of Miss Follen is a romance novel by American author H. B. Goodwin, using the pen name, "Mrs. Goodwin-Talcott". It was published in 1876 by D. Appleton & Company of New York City. The book depicts German country life and manners, with vivid descriptions of the Rhineland and of English scenery, as well as a realistic word-picture of the Oberammergau Passion Play.

== Publication history ==
Goodwin wrote under various pen names. The Fortunes of Miss Follen (New York, D. Appleton & Company, 1876; 12mo, cloth, pp. 270. Price $1.50) was the only instance when she used "Mrs. Goodwin-Talcott". Most of the reviews were favorable, but the one issued by The New York Times was quite negative. When the novel's new edition was published five years later, this time by A. Williams & Co. of Boston, a new title was used, Christine's fortune, and the author was credited as "Mrs. H. B. Goodwin", a name she had used before and after publishing The Fortunes of Miss Follen.

== Plot summary ==
The story opens with a description of Baden and its curious market. The heroine, Christine, makes her appearance as a young and delicate market-girl, presiding over a table of dainty laces or needle work, the results of her own toil. She is the daughter of a frugal couple who cultivate a small dairy farm on the hillside. She has a male friend in the schoolmaster also, who later on would be nearer if he could, and who meanwhile with his books and talk feeds her growing culture with music and knowledge of art and of the great world outside the valley. She is an apt scholar. An early and happy love fades into a consuming grief; but an American gentleman and his wife become interested in her sweet face and pure character, and her elevation begins. They teach her English, and then employ her to teach their young daughter, Bessie, the German language. Presently, Colonel Ranney appears, a retired English army officer who wants a governess for his two little daughters, and Christine has got far enough along to prove just the one.

The story explores Christine's blossoming out in beauty both of person and character. She is a sort of Undine, born not indeed of the waves, but of the vine-clad soil, and carrying with her everywhere the freshness and innocence of nature. None of these uplifting stages seem to be at all foreign to her, and after seeing her graceful motions and hearing her sing at her spinning wheel on her mother's porch it is clear that she is capable of everything which is attributed to her afterwards.

The plot centers on whether Christine will marry Conrad Kleist, the schoolmaster, or Colonel Ranney. The narrative includes an episode involving the escape of a young girl, Alice, and Christine ultimately marries the Colonel and settles on his ancestral estate.

== Major characters ==
- Christine Follen, the heroine, is a German peasant girl who is born with a beauty which gradually lifts her into refined life. She has three lovers in succession, a miller's son, the schoolmaster, and the English gentleman, who finally, in defiance of his family, marries her. His fine estate is the least of his merits.
- Ludwig, the miller's son
- Conrad Kleist, the German schoolmaster
- Herr Vassar, an American
- Colonel Ranney, an Englishman in the British Army, with no special ambitions, but with a thorough-going disposition to do the right thing when he knows it

== Themes ==
Christian sentiment abounds in the book.

== Style and genre ==
The novel is renowned for its sweet, placid tone and for the absence of introspective manner and disposition to satire which had been somewhat overdone in the era when written. The general style of the book is notable for its purity and its closeness of detail. The writer, Mrs. Goodwin Talcott was married to a professor in theological seminary, who has evidently watched the scenes she describes, whether of home life in Germany, or mountain views in Saxony, or the Passion Play at Oberammergau, or works of art in the galleries. She is a good observer; knows what features to describe and how to group them; and then puts them into an artistic setting of pure English that is always elegant and often rises to the poetic. The book is as valuable for its information as it is interesting for its story. In this, as in some other respects, it far surpasses her previous works. The art criticisms are modest and unpretentious, but discriminating; the author manifestly bas no fear of Rubens before her eyes. The chapter describing the Passion Play at Oberammergau is interesting and valuable. The author witnessed the play in 1871, and her descriptions of it then in the columns of a religious weekly were admired and enjoyed by readers.

According to a review in The New Englander (1876), there are a few flaws in this story. But they are all on the surface and easily detected, we example being the title. There are one or two typographical errors in the misspelling of names. The affixing of the title Herr to Mr. Vassar strikes us as inconsistent with the fact that that gentleman is not a German, but an American. If it were necessary, some cases in which the good Herr uses words in his narrative which seem too much like the elevated diction of Pope to be natural in even highly cultivated conversation.

== Reception ==
The New York Times published a scathing review:—

We may commend this book to all readers who are incapable of digesting any but the very weakest description of mental food. It is a story of German social life in which Christine Follen, an improbable peasant girl of Rhineland, is the heroine. The construction of the plot is faulty, and the introduction of one Herr Vassar, though whom the tale is unfolded, is clumsy and quite unnecessary. The author's men are not men. The characters are not individualized. In everybody, we recognize Mrs. Goodwin Talcott. Men do not talk as Herr Vassar and Col. Ranney, an officer in the British Army, talk, while the latter uses expressions which are never heard among Englishmen. The author's descriptions of wild flowers are also far from accurate; and, finally, there is no purpose to the story. No high principle is upheld; no evil is exposed; no moral is to be found. Some readers may perhaps be disposed to question whether such a narrative of the fortunes of a young peasant girl may not have a bad rather than a good tendency, and we should not be indisposed to take part with such. In fact, it is one of that vast multitude of books which seem to have to reason for being, which make us think with wonder at the quantities of spare cash which some writers must possess if they pay their publishers, and which find readers, if they have them at all, in quarters that are far beyond the ken of people of average understanding.
