= Gorham Dummer Abbott =

American clergyman, educator, and author (1807-1874)

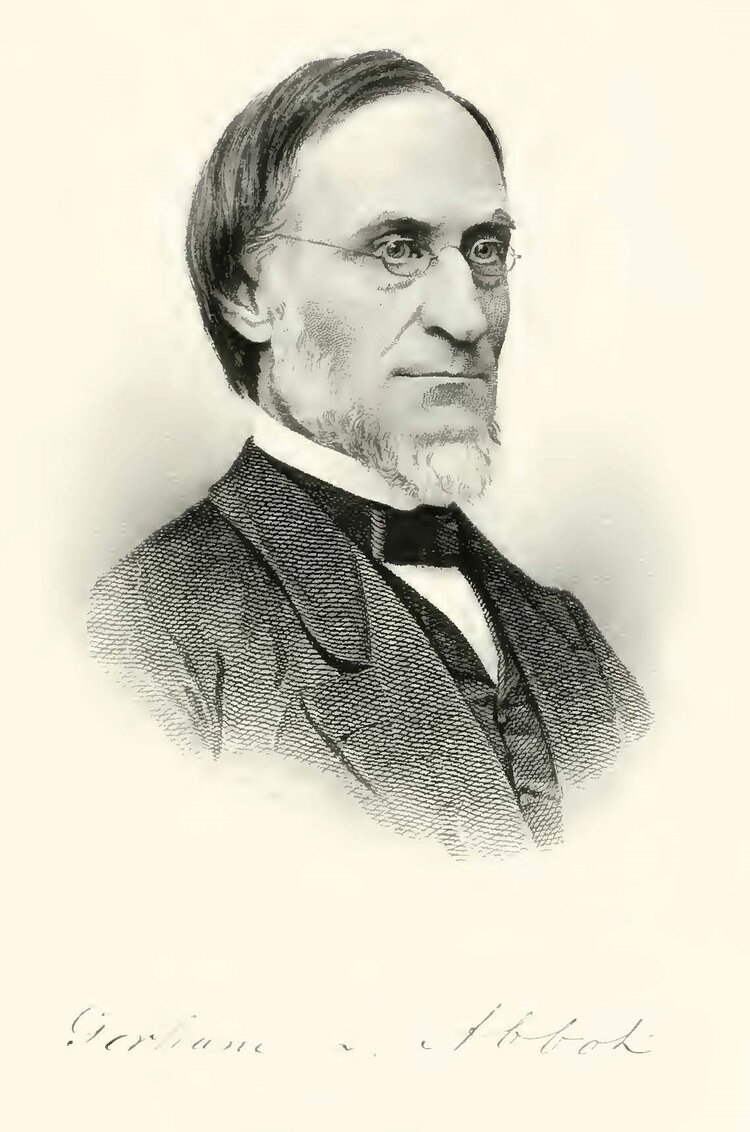
- Born: September 3, 1807; Hallowell, Maine, US
- Died: August 3, 1874 (aged 66); South Natick, Massachusetts, US
- Occupations: clergyman, educator, author
- Spouse: Rebecca S. Leach

Gorham Dummer Abbott (September 3, 1807 – August 3, 1874) was an American clergyman, educator, and author. He was one of the earliest pioneers in the work of higher education for women in this country.

== Early life and education ==
He was born in Hallowell, Maine, to Jacob and Betsey Abbott. In 1826, he graduated from Bowdoin College, and later attended Andover Theological Seminary were also graduated in 1831. Starting in 1831, together with his brother Jacob Abbott, conducted the Mount Vernon School for Girls in Boston, Massachusetts. He left the school in 1833, and married Rebecca S. Leach on February 11, 1834.

== Career ==
He was ordained a minister in the Presbyterian Church in 1837, and served as the pastor of the Presbyterian Church of New Rochelle, New York from 1837 through 1841. Beginning in 1841, he served with the literary department of the American Tract Society, a position he kept until 1843, when he went to New York City to found a new girls' school with his brothers: the Abbott Collegiate Institute for Young Ladies.

In 1846, when one of his brothers decided to leave, Abbott took 40 of the students from this school and established the Spingler Institute for Girls. In an era that ordinarily heralded the cult of domesticity, in which a woman’s sphere was within the home (the four qualities that a “true” or “good” woman embodied were purity, piety, submissiveness, and domesticity), the Spingler Institute was a contradiction: the Institute’s catalogue stated its aim was “to provide for daughters, privileges of education equal to those of sons in our Universities, Colleges, and Halls.” At the school’s dedication ceremony, Abbott proclaimed, “We have between one and two hundred colleges in our country, but where is the Yale, or Harvard, or Princeton for the education of females?”. Abbott’s purpose, according to The American Journal of Education, was “the hope of calling attention to a higher order of education for daughters in our country, and of elevating its general character.” Abbott’s progressive school also housed a large playground for girls and provided athletic equipment, which was unusual for the era. The students also were self-governed, and no punishments were meted out.

On August 23, 1862, The Chicago Daily Tribune called it “one of the best if not the very best institutions in the country...Parents and guardians who wish their daughters and wards to enjoy the highest social and religious advantages, and an intellectual training equal to that which our best colleges can afford, will be sure to have them at the Abbot [sic] Collegiate Institute.” He also was a significant influence on Matthew Vassar in the matter of education of women. In 1870, he retired to South Natick, Massachusetts, where he died in 1874.

== Legacy ==
Abbott also inspired and guided his longtime, personal friend Matthew Vassar in the founding of Vassar College in 1861, and when a Vassar Scholarship fund was dedicated in memory of Gorham Abbott in 1902, more than thirty years after his passing, it was noted that: “Gorham D. Abbott has been considered by many educators to be one of the very earliest pioneers in the work of higher education for women in this country, working in behalf of collegiate education for women at a time when the obstacles and opposition were discouraging in an extreme which is hardly possible to realize today, with Vassar, Wellesley, Smith, Bryn Mawr, and other institutions leading their flourishing and influential existence.”

== Publication ==
He was the author of several books, including:

- The Family at Home: or, Familiar Illustrations of the Various Domestic Duties (1834) and
- Mexico and the United States, Their Mutual Relations and Common Interests (1869).
