= Garage at 219 Main Street =

Historic church in Maine, United States

- Free Will Baptist Meetinghouse
- U.S. National Register of Historic Places
- U.S. Historic district – Contributing property
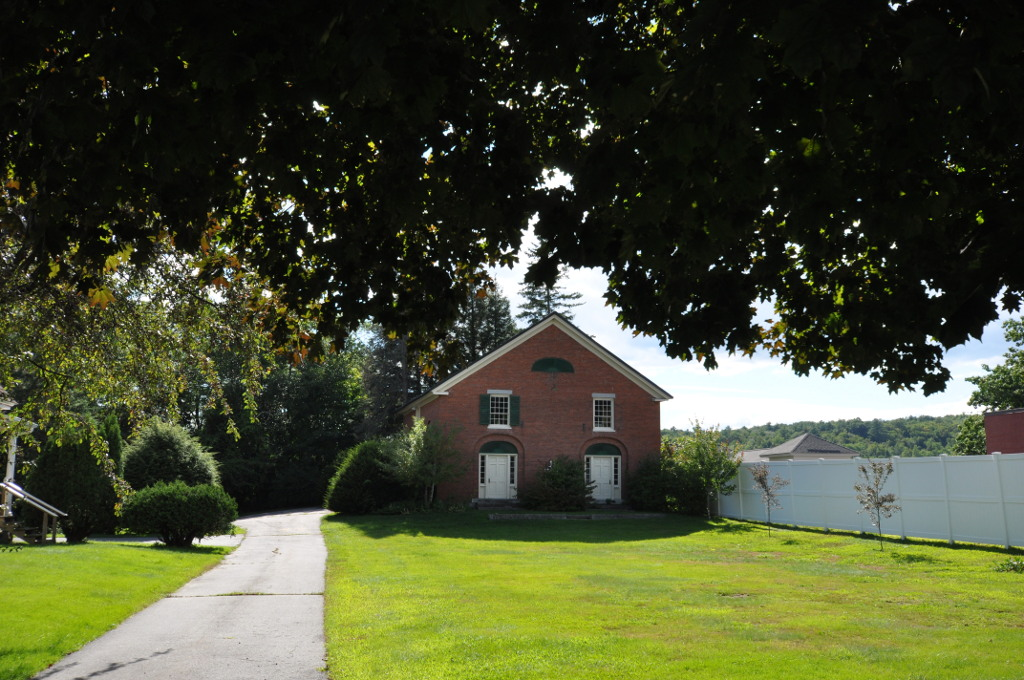

- Location within Maine Location within the United States
- Location: 219 Main St., Farmington, Maine
- Coordinates: 44°40′8″N 70°9′3″W
- Area: 1 acre (0.40 ha)
- Built: 1835
- Architectural style: Federal
- Part of: Farmington Historic District (ID94001551)
- NRHP reference No.: 73000264

Significant dates
- Added to NRHP: August 28, 1973
- Designated CP: January 20, 1995

The Garage at 219 Main Street in Farmington, Maine, was once a Free Will Baptist Meetinghouse. Built in 1835, it is one of a relatively small number of 19th-century brick meeting houses, and its history exhibits the creative reuse of structures in rural Maine. It was listed on the National Register of Historic Places in 1973.

== Description ==
The church is a rectangular brick structure, set well back from Main Street, with a gable roof whose end faces the street. It exhibits modest Federal styling, with a pair of entry doors on the front facade, each with narrow sidelight windows and topped by a decorative fan. Above each door is a single sash window, with 12 over 8 lights. The gable pediment also has a decorative fan. There is a large doorway in the center of the southern facade, presently used as a garage door. The interior, although significantly altered from its original religious setting, includes the inscription "Glory to God in the Highest" on its plaster walls.

== History ==
The Free Will Baptist congregation was established in Farmington in 1793, and first met in people's homes and barns. This meetinghouse was built in 1835 at a cost of $1,250, and was the first of the denomination north and east of Gorham. In the early 20th century the building was converted for use as a cheese factory, at which time the side garage entrance was added. Later 20th century uses included a medical facility, a stable, and as a fur storage building, before its present use as residential garage.

== See also ==
- National Register of Historic Places listings in Franklin County, Maine
