= Austin Abbott =

American novelist

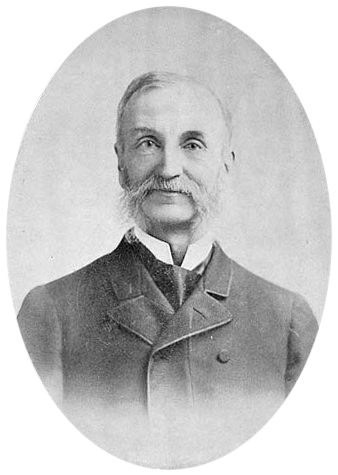
- Austin Abbott
- Born: December 18, 1831; Boston, Massachusetts
- Died: April 19, 1896 (aged 64); New York City
- Citizenship: United States of America
- Education: New York University
- Occupations: Lawyer; author; novelist; writer
- Father: Jacob Abbott (1803-1879)

Austin Abbott (December 18, 1831 – April 19, 1896) was an American lawyer and academic. He is probably best remembered as being the government counsel in the trial of Charles J. Guiteau for the assassination of President James Garfield.

== Early life ==
On December 18, 1831, Abbott was born in Boston, Massachusetts, son of Jacob Abbott and Harriet Vaughan Abbott.

== Education ==
He was educated in Boston and was graduated with an LLD and with honors from the University of the City of New York in 1851.

== Career ==
In 1852, Abbott was admitted to the bar and became a partner with his brother Benjamin Vaughan Abbott in the legal firm Abbott Brothers, a firm he stayed with through 1870. He aided his brother Benjamin in the preparation of his well-known digests of laws and was himself a prolific legal author. His works, mostly of a practical character, included a comprehensive digest of New York Statutes and Reports, a treatise on Trial Practice, and a useful collection of legal forms, all of which proved to be useful to the profession. He married Ellen Louise Dummer Gilman in 1854. His second wife was since 1879 Anna Rowe Worth.

He assisted commissioners in preparing the codes of New York in 1865. In 1875, he gained a national reputation as counsel for Henry Ward Beecher in Theodore Tilton's suit against him.

In 1881, he took the case against Guiteau and won. The case was one of the first highly publicized uses of the insanity defense in the United States. From 1891 until his death he was Dean of the Law School of the New York University, and the professor of pleading, equity, and evidence there as well.

He was a member of the New York bar association, the Union League Club, a founder of the Y. M. C. A. of New York City, and a deacon of the Broadway (N.Y.) Tabernacle.

== Works ==
He wrote several books and he assisted in the preparation of Abbott's New York Digest, and Abbott's Forms. He also wrote in conjunction with his brothers, Benjamin Vaughan and Lyman, the novels:

- Cone Cut Corners; The Experiences of a Conservative Family in Fanatical Times (1855)
- Matthew Caraby (1859)

His non-fiction works include the following books, as well as several briefs and other legal writings:

- Reports of Practice Cases Determined in the Courts of the State of New York, Volume 1, 1855 (with his brother Benjamin Vaughan Abbott)
- Reports of Decisions of the Court of Appeals of New York, 1850–69, (4 volumes), 1873–1874
- New Cases, Courts of the State of New York, 31 volumes covering 1876–1894,
- Abbott's Digest of New York Statutes and Reports, new 6 volume edition, 1873
- Official Report of the Trial of Henry Ward Beecher, 2 volumes, 1875.

His publications also include:

- Legal Remembrances (1871)
- New Cases: Decisions of the Courts, State of New York, 1874–1890, with an analytical index to points of law and practice (26 volumes, 1877–1891)
- Brief for the Trial of Civil Issues before a Jury (1885)
- Table of Cases Criticised in the New York Reports (1887)
- Principles and Forms of Practice (2 volumes, 1887–1888)
- Brief for the Trial of Criminal Cases (1889)
