= Farmington Academy =

Farmington Academy was a secondary school for boys which opened in 1812 in Farmington, Maine. Plagued by financial problems, the property became part of the State Normal School system in the 1860s. Merrill Hall is located on the site of what was the Farmington Academy.

== History ==
Early in 19th century a number of individuals felt the importance and necessity of providing a higher institution of learning, not only for the training of young men and women as teachers, but to furnish a preparatory school for students who might wish to enter college. The men of the period foresaw that the establishment of an academy at Farmington, Maine would be of advantage to the rising generation, consequently they took measures to procure a charter from the General Court of Massachusetts, which was granted February 13, 1807. The Academy was opened for instruction January 1, 1812.

During the existence of this institution, young ladies were admitted to its instruction, sometimes in a separate department under the tuition of a preceptress, but more frequently in the main department. An additional half township of land was granted to the Farmington Academy by a resolve of the legislature of 1850, and this added some $52,000 to the endowment of the institution, which had suffered during its entire existence from lack of funds. However, the school was generously patronized, drawing students from every part of the State.

== Preceptors ==
Rev. James Hall became its first preceptor, at a salary of US$400 a year. N. G. Howard acted as preceptor from 1816 to 1817; Joseph Caldwell from 1817 to 1818; Moses 5. Moody from 1818 to 1819; William A. Drew from 1820 to 1823; Nathaniel Greene from 1823 to 1830; David Worcester, Horatio Getchell, and M. Upham from 1830 to 1837; John J. Butler from 1837 to 1839; Orrin B. Cheney from 1839 to 1841; Alexander H. Abbott from 1841 to 1849; Jonas Burnham from August 27, 1849, to July 15, 1859. During Burnham’s preceptorship, the number of terms was twenty, the total number of scholars was 2,524, with an average of one 126 to a term; and 50 students were prepared for college. From 1859 to 1863, Horatio O. Ladd and Ambrose P. Kelsey were respectively principals of the Academy.

== State Normal School ==
By a resolve of the trustees, adopted on the third of June, 1863, a tender of the funds and all other property of the academy was made to the state for the establishment of a State Normal School at Farmington (now University of Maine at Farmington). By an order of the Governor and Council of October 9, 1863, the tender was accepted, and the school located at Farmington. By a vote of the trustees of the academy, passed January 26, 1867, the treasurer was authorized and empowered to convey, upon certain conditions, the whole property to the State of Maine, subject, however, to the payment of a mortgage. The total value of the property thus conveyed, subject to the mortgage aforesaid, was estimated as follows: real estate, including old academy building, chemical and philosophical apparatus, library, etc., $5,000; personal assets, converted into money and expended in the erection of the new building, about $3,500, making a total of $8,500 given to the state.
