= Isabel and Chester Greenwood House =

Historic house in Maine, United States

- U.S. National Register of Historic Places
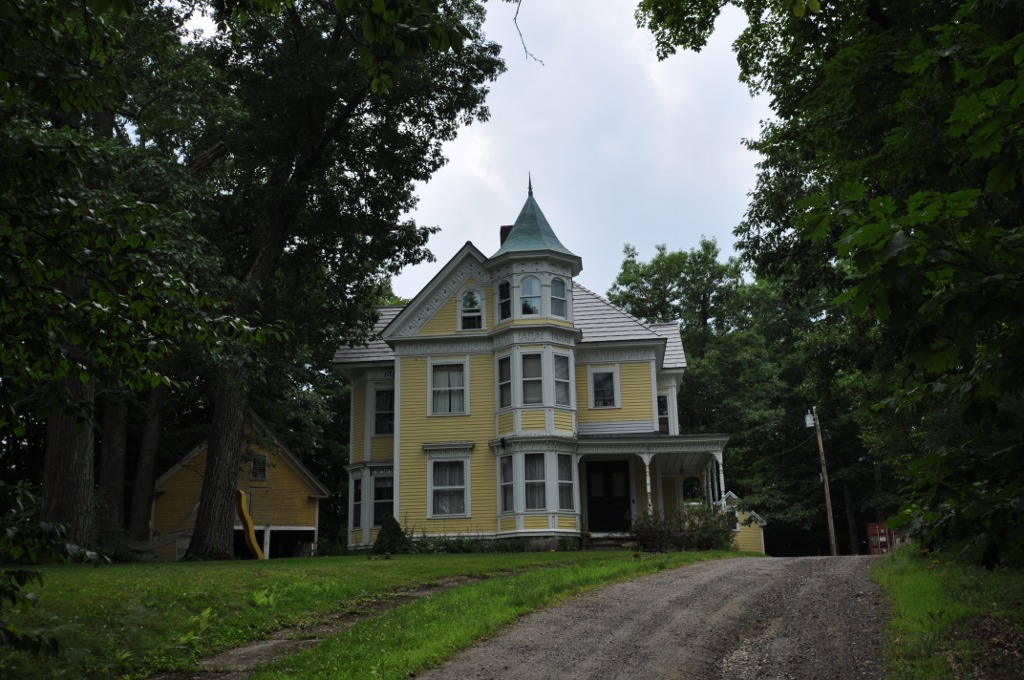

- Location within Maine Location within the United States
- Location: 112 Hill Street, Farmington, Maine
- Coordinates: 44°39′39″N 70°8′52″W
- Area: 0.5 acres (0.20 ha)
- Built: 1896
- Architectural style: Queen Anne
- NRHP reference No.: 78000160
- Added to NRHP: 1978

The Isabel and Chester Greenwood House is an historic house at 112 Hill Street in Farmington, Maine. Built in 1896, it is an architecturally distinctive sophisticated Queen Anne Victorian. It is also notable as the home of Chester Greenwood, who invented the earmuff. It was listed on the National Register of Historic Places in 1978.

== Description and history ==
The Greenwood House is a 2 1/2-story wood-frame structure, set on a wooded knoll between Maine State Route 27 and the Sandy River, south of downtown Farmington. The house as asymmetrical massing typical of the Queen Anne period, its most prominent feature being a three-story octagonal tower topped by a bellcast pyramidal roof. The lower levels of the tower have rectangular sash windows, while the third level has arched windows, a detail repeated in a large half-story gable project from the hip roof to the left of the tower. A single-story porch wraps around to the right of the tower, supported by turned posts. There is delicate sawn woodwork in a frieze band below the main roof, and in the front-facing gable. The interior of the building also features ornate woodwork characteristic of the period.

Chester Greenwood (1858-1937), is locally famous as the inventor of the earmuff, which were manufactured at a local factory and shipped across the colder parts of North America. Greenwood invented the earmuff at age 15, obtained a patent for it in 1877. He engaged in many other business endeavours in Farmingtion, including establishing its first telephone exchange (with equipment he manufactured), a bicycle factory, and a machine shop. His factory building still stands in Farmington on Front Street, as does the Greenwood Block in Main Street.

== See also ==
- National Register of Historic Places listings in Franklin County, Maine
