= H. B. Goodwin =

American novelist

Hannah Elizabeth Bradbury Goodwin Talcott
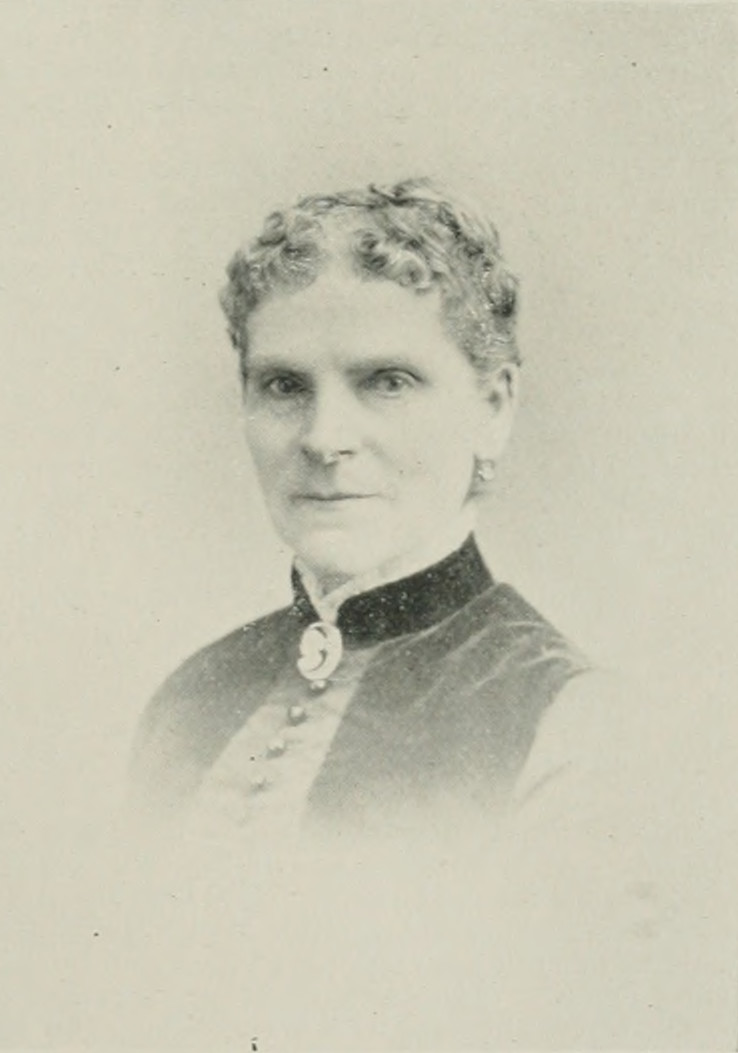
- "A Woman of the Century"
- Born: Hannah Elizabeth Bradbury; March 16, 1827; Chesterville, Maine, U.S.
- Died: June 1, 1893 (aged 66); Boston, Massachusetts, U.S.
- Education: Farmington Academy
- Occupations: educator; writer
- Spouses: George Clinton Goodwin (m. 1857; died 1869); Daniel Smith Talcott (m. 1874)
- Writing career
- Pen name: "H. B."; "H. E. B"; "H. B. G."; "Mrs. H. B. Goodwin"; "Mrs. Goodwin-Talcott"
- Genres: novels; short stories; sketches; poetry
- Notable work: Dorothy Gray

Hannah Elizabeth Bradbury Goodwin Talcott (née, Bradbury; after first marriage, Goodwin; after second marriage, Talcott; March 3, 1827 – June 1, 1893) was an American novelist, poet and educator from Maine who resided in Boston for many years. She wrote under various pen names, including H. B., H. E. B., H. B. G., Mrs. H. B. Goodwin, and Mrs. Goodwin-Talcott.

== Early life and education ==
Hannah Elizabeth Bradbury was born March 3, 1827, in Chesterville, Maine. Her parents were Benjamin and Elizabeth (Davolle) Bradbury. Her school life was spent mainly in Farmington Academy.

== Career ==
Before her marriage, she wrote many short stories and sketches, which were published in magazines and papers under her initials, "H. B." or "H. E. B". She worked as a teacher of girls in Bangor, Maine, and afterward served as principal of the Charlestown Female Seminary in Boston.

On July 15, 1857, she married George Clinton Goodwin, a Boston drug manufacturer. After this marriage, she wrote three novels under the pen name, "H. B. G." Her first novel, Madge (New York, D. Appleton and Company, 1863), was favorably received. Goodwin regarded it as the least worthy of her books. Her second was, Roger Deane's work (Boston, Graves and Young, 1863). The third, Sherbrooke (New York, D. Appleton and Company, 1866), was a story of New England life. The success of that story was instantaneous.

Widowed in 1869, her next two novels appeared under the name, "Mrs. H. B. Goodwin". Dr. Howell's Family (Boston, Lee and Shepard, 1869), was written during months of great physical pain. Many readers regarded it as the author's strongest work. After its publication, Goodwin was for several years an invalid and only wrote short stories, sketches, and letters from Europe to religious newspapers. A spray from Lucerne appeared in 1873.

In Boston, on July 9, 1874, she married Professor Daniel Smith Talcott, D.D., of Bangor, Maine. Using the name, "Mrs. Goodwin-Talcott", her next work was The Fortunes of Miss Follen (New York, D. Appleton & Company, 1876). The book received a damning review, but she republished the book five years later as Christine's fortune (A. Williams, 1881), a picture of German life, returning to the pen name, "Mrs. H. B. Goodwin". One Among Many (Boston, Cupples, Upham and Company, 1884) gave new evidence of her ability to represent real life. Elizabeth and the roses : a legend of Hungary (Boston, Cupples, Upham and Company, 1886) was in the poetic genre. Our Party of Four (Boston, Cupples and Hurd, 1887), describes a tour in Spain. Perhaps to Dorothy Gray (Boston; Damrell & Upsham, 1891) the highest praise came from critics and literary friends. She also compiled a volume of essays on art and history.

== Later life ==
For the last 16 years of her life, she was strongly associated with the educational work of Wellesley College. She was an active member of its board of trustees and of its executive committee. She also wrote and read to the students of Wellesley many essays on art, the studies for which were made in the great art centers of Europe, where she traveled in England, France, Germany, Italy and Spain.

She died in Boston on June 1, 1893.

== Works ==
=== As H. B. G. ===
- 1863, Madge; or, Night and morning (text)
- 1863, Roger Deane's work (text)
- 1866, Sherbrooke (text)

=== As Mrs. H. B. Goodwin ===
- 1869, Dr. Howell's family (text)
- 1873, A spray from Lucerne
- 1881, Christine's fortune
- 1884, One Among Many (text)
- 1886, Elizabeth and the roses : a legend of Hungary (poetry)
- 1887, Our party of four : a story of travel
- 1891, Dorothy Gray : an Indian Summer idyl (text)

=== As Mrs. Goodwin-Talcott ===
- 1876, The Fortunes of Miss Follen (text)

== Gallery ==
Dr. Howell's family

Madge; or, Night and morning

Sherbrooke

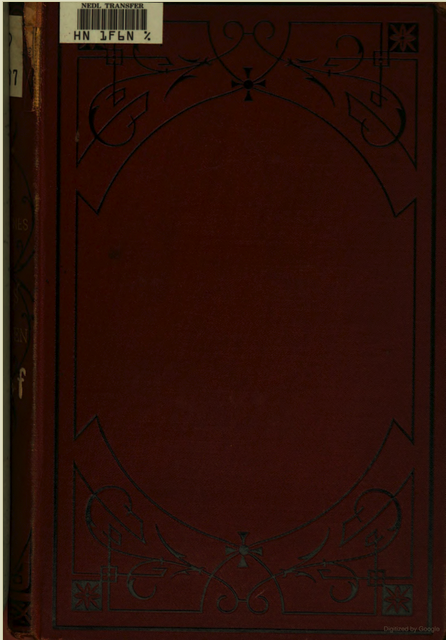
The Fortunes of Miss Follen
