= Greenacre (Farmington, Maine) =

Historic house in Maine, United States

- U.S. National Register of Historic Places
- U.S. Historic district – Contributing property
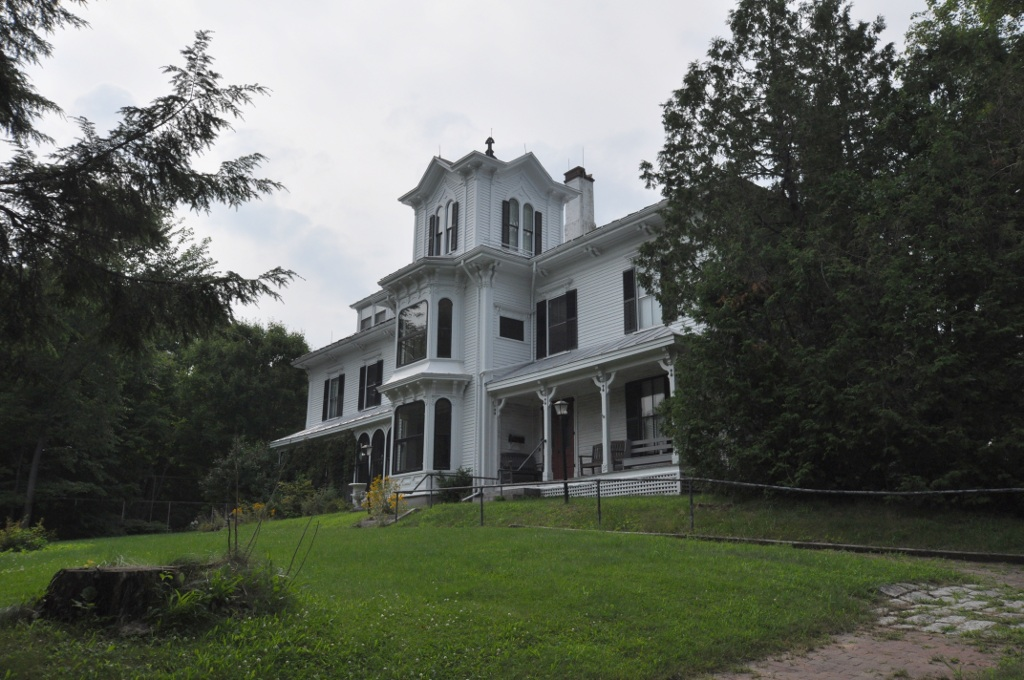

- Location within Maine Location within the United States
- Location: 17 Court St, Farmington, Maine
- Coordinates: 44°40′24″N 70°8′53″W
- Area: 1 acre (0.40 ha)
- Built: 1880
- Architect: Alvin Neal, Theodore Stewart
- Architectural style: Italianate
- Part of: Farmington Historic District (ID94001551)
- NRHP reference No.: 82000422

Significant dates
- Added to NRHP: October 29, 1982
- Designated CP: January 20, 1995

Greenacre is a historical house in Farmington, Maine. It is set on a large lot bounded by Court, Fountain, and Orchard Streets, northeast of Farmington's downtown area. Built in 1880, it is one of the largest and most ornate 19th-century houses in Franklin County. The property was listed on the National Register of Historic Places in 1982.

== Description ==
Greenacre is set near the back of a large lot which slopes upward from Court Street toward Orchard Street. It is a two-story wood-frame structure set on a granite foundation, with a hip roof. Its most prominent feature is a square three-story tower, which rises near the center of the front (south-facing) facade. The main entrance is in the first of two bays to the right of the tower, while there are three bays to its left. A single-story porch extends across the front. The first two levels of the tower have bay windows in front, while the third level has smaller sash windows on all four faces. The building's roofline is decorated with Italianate brackets, and windows are capped by carved lintels with entablature. There is a single clay tennis court maintained by a local group. The property also includes a period carriage house, which is joined to the house by a single-story ell.

== History ==
Greenacre was built by Joseph Thwing, a tanner, in 1880. Thwing sold the property in 1894 to Franklin Clark, who was responsible for enlarging it by the addition of bays on the sides. In 1919 Clark's estate sold the property to Harold Titcomb. Titcomb was an internationally renowned mining engineer, who traveled widely and had married an Englishwoman. The Titcombs decorated their home with antiques and cultural artifacts acquired on their travels. They also frequently entertained, and Greenacre (which was given its name by the Titcombs) was a fashionable social center in the community. Titcomb was also a skilled archer, who was the first American member of the Royal Toxophilite Society and was its president at his death in 1953.

== See also ==
- National Register of Historic Places listings in Franklin County, Maine
