= Jacob Abbott =

American writer of children's books (1803–1879)

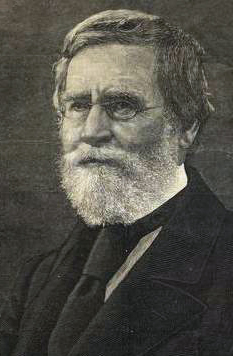
- Born: November 14, 1803; Hallowell, Massachusetts, United States
- Died: October 31, 1879 (aged 75); Farmington, Maine, United States
- Education: Bowdoin College
- Occupations: Children's author, historical biographer

Jacob Abbott (November 14, 1803 – October 31, 1879) was an American writer of children's books and historical biographies.

== Early life ==
On November 14, 1803, Abbott was born in Hallowell, Maine to Jacob Abbott II and Betsey Chandler. He attended the Hallowell Academy.

== Education ==
Abbott graduated from Bowdoin College in 1820. At some point during his years there, he supposedly added the second "t" to his surname, to avoid being "Jacob Abbot the 3rd" (although one source notes he did not actually begin signing his name with two t's until several years later).

Abbott studied at Andover Theological Seminary in 1821, 1822, and 1824. He taught at Portland Academy and was a tutor in Amherst College during the next year.

== Career ==
From 1825 to 1829 Abbott was professor of mathematics and natural philosophy at Amherst College; was licensed to preach by the Hampshire Association in 1826; founded the Mount Vernon School for Young Ladies in Boston in 1829, and was principal of it in 1829–1833; was pastor of Eliot Congregational Church (which he founded), at Roxbury, Massachusetts in 1834–1835; and was, with his brothers, a founder. In 1838, he purchased land, now Abbott park, in Farmington, Maine but moved to New York when his wife died shortly thereafter. In 1843–1851 he was the principal of Abbott's Institute, and in 1845–1848 of the Mount Vernon School for Boys, in New York City.

He was a prolific author, writing juvenile fiction, brief histories, biographies, religious books for the general reader, and a few works in popular science. He wrote 180 books and was a coauthor or editor of 31 more. He died in Farmington, Maine, where he had spent part of his time after 1839, and where his brother, Samuel Phillips Abbott, founded the Abbott School.

His Rollo Books, such as Rollo at Play and Rollo in Europe, are the best known of his writings, having as their chief characters a representative boy and his associates. In them Abbott did for one or two generations of young American readers a service not unlike that performed earlier, in England and the US, by the authors of Evenings at Home, The History of Sandford and Merton, and The Parent's Assistant. To follow up his Rollo books, he wrote of Uncle George, using him to teach the young readers about ethics, geography, history, and science. He also wrote 22 volumes of biographical histories and a 10 volume set titled the Franconia Stories.

His intention was to both amuse and educate, shown by this quotation from the Preface of Bruno:

The books, though called story books, are not intended to be works of amusement merely to those who may receive them, but of substantial instruction. The successive volumes will comprise a great variety, both in respect to the subjects which they treat, and to the form and manner in which the subjects will be presented; but the end and aim of all will be to impart useful knowledge, to develop the thinking and reasoning powers, to teach a correct and discriminating use of language, to present models of good conduct for imitation, and bad examples to be shunned, to explain and enforce the highest principles of moral duty, and, above all, to awaken and cherish the spirit of humble and unobtrusive, but heartfelt piety.

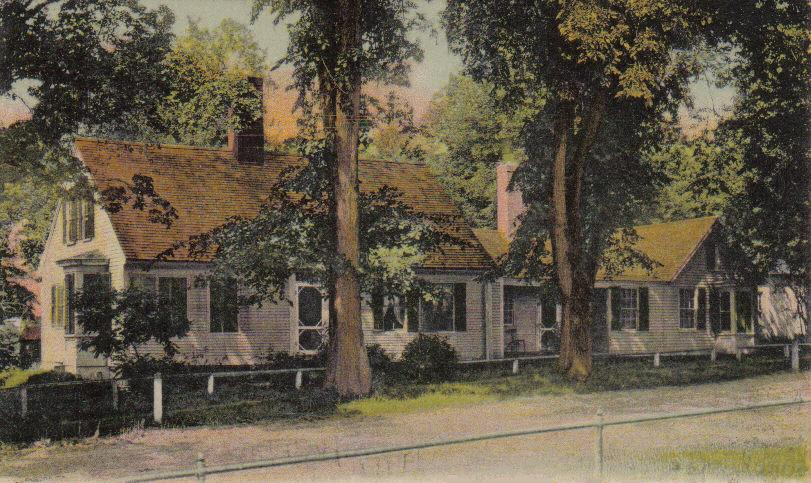
Fewacres in 1906, Abbott's residence at Farmington, Maine

His brothers, John Stevens Cabot Abbott and Gorham Dummer Abbott, were also authors.

See his Young Christian, Memorial Edition, with a Sketch of the Author by Edward Abbott with a bibliography of his works.

Other works of note: Lucy Books, Jonas Books, Harper's Story Books, Marco Paul, Gay Family, and Juno Books.

== Personal life ==
On May 18, 1829, Abbott married Harriet Vaughan. He had four sons; Benjamin Vaughan Abbott, Austin Abbott, both eminent lawyers, Lyman Abbott, and Edward Abbott, a clergyman, were also well-known authors.

== Select Bibliography ==
=== Biographies ===
- Alexander the Great (1841)
- Alfred the Great
- King Charles I
- King Charles II
- Cleopatra
- Cyrus the Great (1878)
- Darius
- Queen Elizabeth
- Genghis Khan
- Hannibal
- Hortense
- Josephine
- Julius Caesar
- Margaret of Anjou
- Mary, Queen of Scots
- Nero
- Peter the Great
- Pyrrhus
- Richard I
- Richard II
- Richard III
- Romulus
- William the Conqueror
- Xerxes

=== American History Series ===
- Aboriginal America (1860)
- Discovery of America (1860)
- Southern Colonies (1860)
- Northern Colonies (1862)
- Wars of the Colonies (1863)
- Revolt of the Colonies (1864)
- War of the Revolution (1864)
- Washington (1865)

=== Educational fiction ===
- Rollo's Experiments (1839)
- Rollo Learning to Read (1847)
- Rollo at Work or, The Way to Be Industrious (1848)
- Rollo at Play or, Safe Amusements (1850)
- Rollo in London (1854)
- Bruno or, Lessons of Fidelity, Patience, and Self-Denial Taught by a Dog (1854)
- Cousin Lucy's Conversations (1854)
- Rollo in the Woods (1857)
- Georgie (1857)

[Note: dates may be revised editions]
