= Chesterville, Maine =

- Town
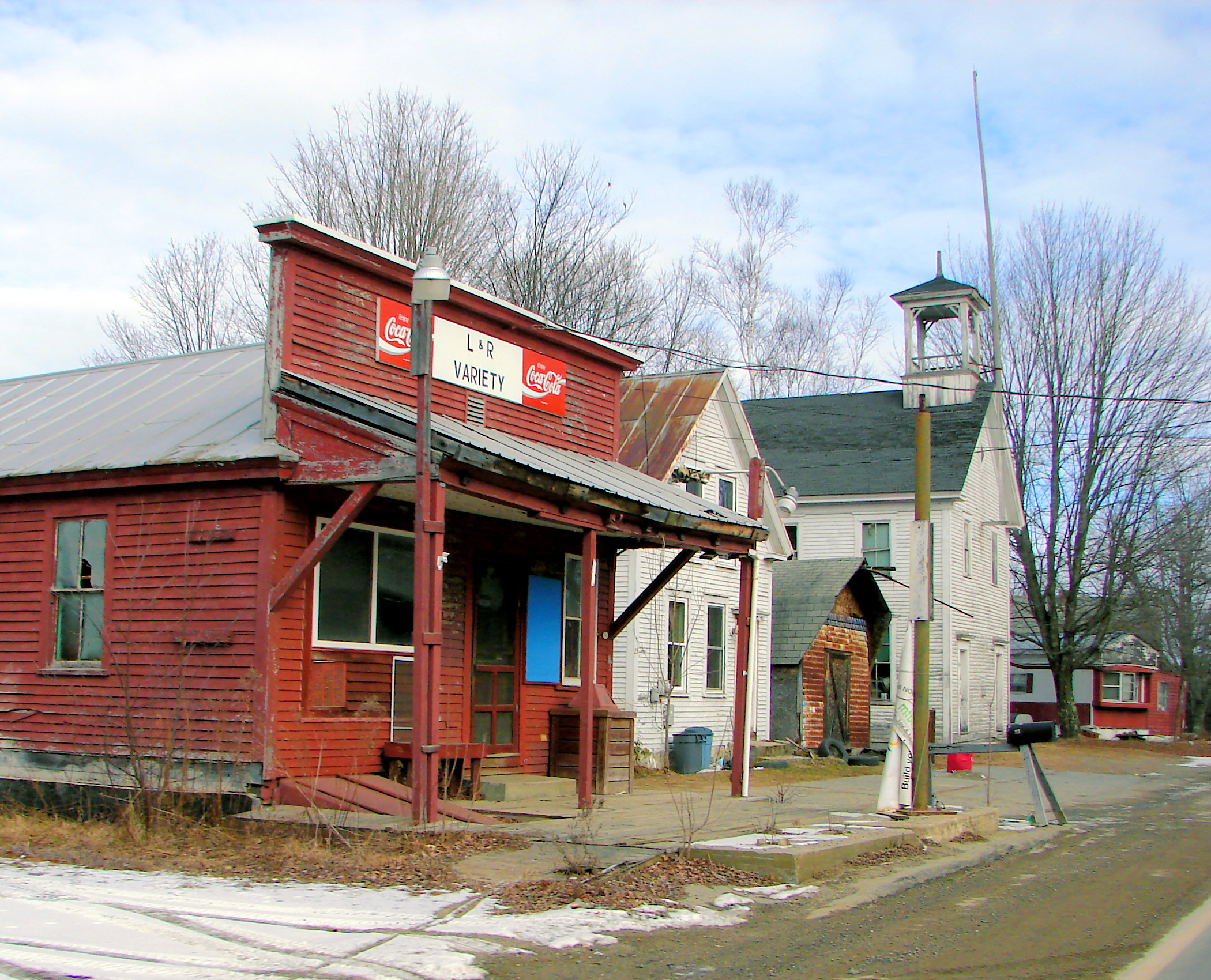
- North Chesterville, 2012

- Seal

- Location within Maine Location within the United States
- Coordinates: 44°31′39″N 70°06′30″W
- Country: United States
- State: Maine
- County: Franklin
- Villages: Chesterville; North Chesterville; Farmington Falls (part)

Government
  - Mayor: Carroll Corbin

Area
  - Total: 37.55 sq mi (97.25 km^{2})
  - Land: 36.17 sq mi (93.68 km^{2})
  - Water: 1.38 sq mi (3.57 km^{2})
- Elevation: 361 ft (110 m)

Population (2020)
  - Total: 1,328
  - Density: 37/sq mi (14.2/km^{2})
- Time zone: UTC-5 (Eastern (EST))
  - Summer (DST): UTC-4 (EDT)
- ZIP code: 04938
- Area code: 207
- FIPS code: 23-12595
- GNIS feature ID: 582409
- Website: www.townofchesterville.me

Chesterville is a town in Franklin County, Maine, United States. The population was 1,328 at the 2020 census.

== Geography ==
According to the United States Census Bureau, the town has a total area of 37.55 square miles (97.25 km^{2}), of which 36.17 square miles (93.68 km^{2}) is land and 1.38 square miles (3.57 km^{2}) is water.

== Demographics ==
Historical population
Census	Pop.	Note	%±
1810	430		—
1830	923		—
1840	1,098		19.0%
1850	1,142		4.0%
1860	1,110		−2.8%
1870	1,011		−8.9%
1880	955		−5.5%
1890	770		−19.4%
1900	709		−7.9%
1910	627		−11.6%
1920	586		−6.5%
1930	575		−1.9%
1940	538		−6.4%
1950	588		9.3%
1960	505		−14.1%
1970	643		27.3%
1980	869		35.1%
1990	1,012		16.5%
2000	1,170		15.6%
2010	1,352		15.6%
2020	1,328		−1.8%
U.S. Decennial Census

=== 2010 census ===
At the 2010 census there were 1,352 people, 549 households, and 392 families living in the town. The population density was 37.4 inhabitants per square mile (14.4/km^{2}). There were 779 housing units at an average density of 21.5 per square mile (8.3/km^{2}). The racial makeup of the town was 97.3% White, 0.1% African American, 0.2% Native American, 0.6% Asian, 0.1% from other races, and 1.8% from two or more races. Hispanic or Latino of any race were 0.4%.

Of the 549 households 29.1% had children under the age of 18 living with them, 57.2% were married couples living together, 10.4% had a female householder with no husband present, 3.8% had a male householder with no wife present, and 28.6% were non-families. 22.8% of households were one person and 7.8% were one person aged 65 or older. The average household size was 2.46 and the average family size was 2.81.

The median age in the town was 44.1 years. 20.1% of residents were under the age of 18; 7.4% were between the ages of 18 and 24; 24% were from 25 to 44; 34.3% were from 45 to 64; and 14.3% were 65 or older. The gender makeup of the town was 49.4% male and 50.6% female.

=== 2000 census ===
At the 2000 census there were 1,170 people, 467 households, and 324 families living in the town. The population density was 32.1 inhabitants per square mile (12.4/km^{2}). There were 684 housing units at an average density of 18.8 per square mile (7.2/km^{2}). The racial makeup of the town was 98.46% White, 1.20% Asian, 0.09% from other races, and 0.26% from two or more races. Hispanic or Latino of any race were 0.51%.

Of the 467 households 33.8% had children under the age of 18 living with them, 56.5% were married couples living together, 7.5% had a female householder with no husband present, and 30.6% were non-families. 22.1% of households were one person and 7.7% were one person aged 65 or older. The average household size was 2.50 and the average family size was 2.94.

The age distribution was 25.0% under the age of 18, 7.6% from 18 to 24, 29.1% from 25 to 44, 27.3% from 45 to 64, and 10.9% 65 or older. The median age was 38 years. For every 100 females, there were 95.7 males. For every 100 females age 18 and over, there were 97.1 males.

The median household income was $31,563 and the median family income was $35,938. Males had a median income of $29,615 versus $20,592 for females. The per capita income for the town was $15,376. About 10.0% of families and 12.7% of the population were below the poverty line, including 10.7% of those under age 18 and 15.2% of those age 65 or over.

== Notable person ==
- H. B. Goodwin (1827–1893), novelist
