= Dingley Building =

- Oak Street School
- U.S. National Register of Historic Places
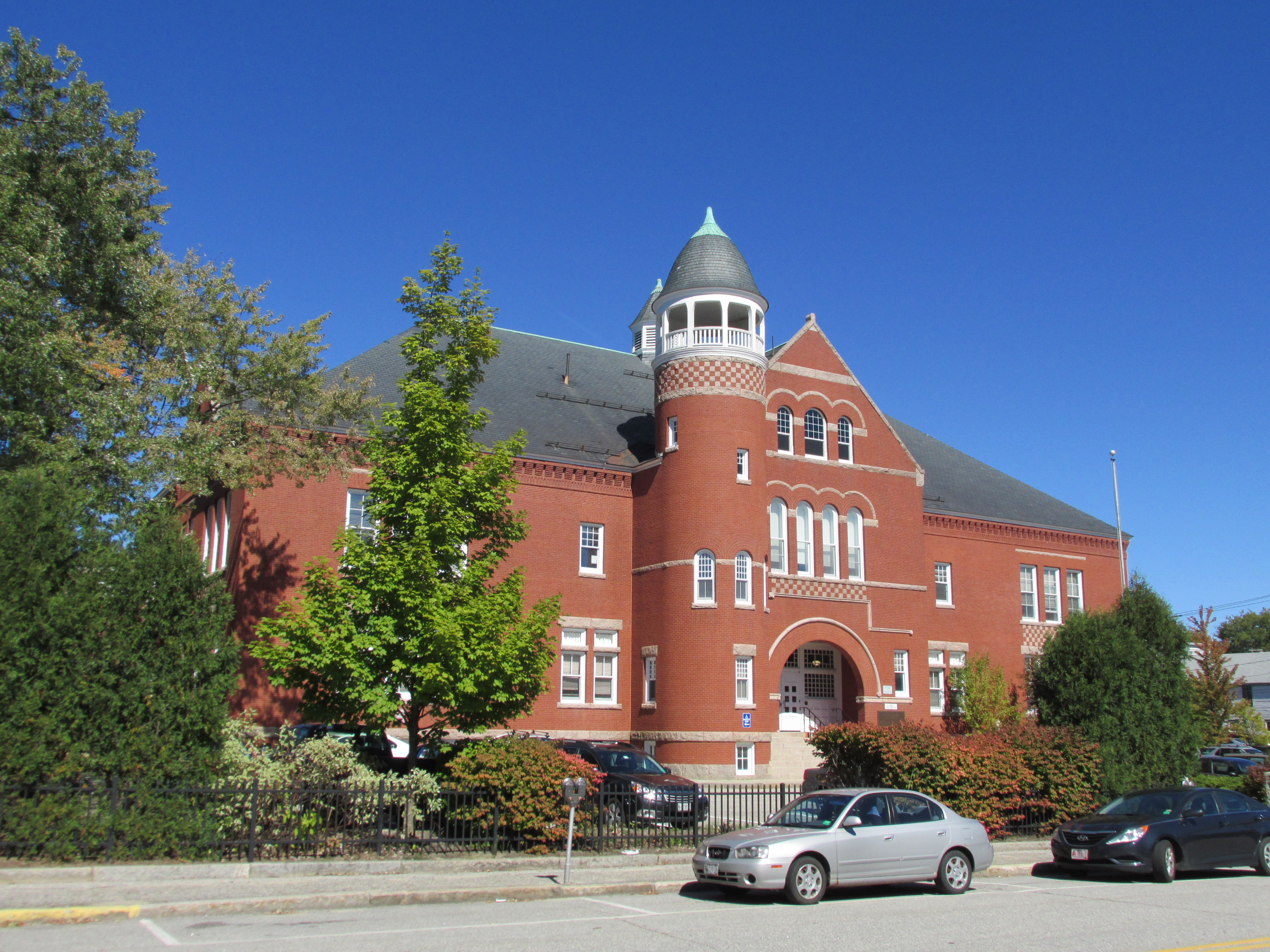
- Oak Street School

- Location within Maine Location within the United States
- Interactive map showing the location for Dingley Building
- Location: 36 Oak Street, Lewiston, Maine
- Coordinates: 44°5′55″N 70°12′58″W
- Built: 1890
- Architect: George M. Coombs
- Architectural style: Romanesque Revival
- NRHP reference No.: 76000190
- Added to NRHP: October 8, 1976

The Dingley Building, formerly the Oak Street School, is a historic municipal building at 36 Oak Street in Lewiston, Maine. Built in 1890, it is a distinctive local example of Richardsonian Romanesque architecture, designed by local architect George M. Coombs. It was added to the National Register of Historic Places in 1976. It now houses the Lewiston school system's administrative offices.

== Description and history ==
The Dingley Building stands near the eastern edge of Lewiston's commercial downtown area, on a lot bounded by Middle, Oak, and Bates Streets. It is a two-story masonry structure, built of red brick with stone trim. It is covered by a tall hip roof, and is set on a raised basement, from which it is separated by a stone beltcourse. The main entrance is recessed in a large round-arch opening, which shelters the stairs providing access. The entrance is set in a projecting gabled section, from which a turret rises at the left corner, topped by an open belvedere and a convex circular roof. Windows in the projecting section above the entrance are set in round-arch openings, in a group of four on the second level, and in a Palladian-style group of three in the gable.

The school building was designed by architect George M. Coombs and was built in 1890. The name was changed to the Dingley Building in 1899 in honor of Nelson Dingley, Jr., a former governor of Maine and longtime congressman from Maine's second district. It was later used as an elementary school, then the headquarters for the Lewiston Board of Education. It remains the central office for the school district today. The Lewiston Historical Commission also meets in the building.

A lightning bolt struck the Dingley Building in June 2008, causing no injuries, but resulting in moderate damage to the wooden tower as well as utilities.

== See also ==
- National Register of Historic Places listings in Androscoggin County, Maine
