= Farmington Falls, Maine =

- Village
- Location within Maine
- Coordinates: 44°37′15″N 70°04′31″W
- Country: United States
- State: Maine
- County: Franklin
- Town: Farmington
- Elevation: 344 ft (105 m)
- Time zone: UTC-5 (Eastern (EST))
  - Summer (DST): UTC-4 (EDT)
- ZIP code: 04940
- Area code: 207
- GNIS feature ID: 566055

Farmington Falls is an unincorporated village in the town of Farmington, Franklin County, Maine, United States. The community is located along the Sandy River, 5 miles (8 km) southeast of the village of Farmington; U.S. Route 2, Maine State Route 27, Maine State Route 41, and Maine State Route 156 all pass through the village. Farmington Falls has a post office, with ZIP code 04940.
