= Massachusetts Homeopathic Hospital =

Former hospital in Massachusetts, United States

Coordinates: 42.336°N 71.071°W

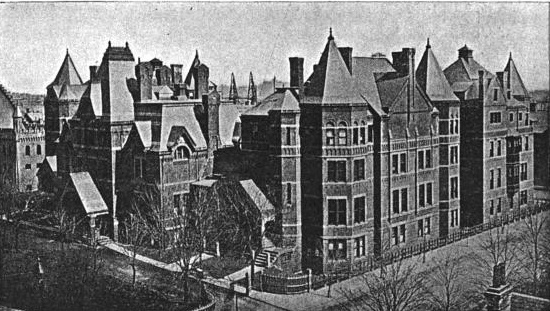
Picture of the hospital, c. 1916

Massachusetts Homeopathic Hospital was a homeopathic institution in Boston, Massachusetts, at which the first successful kidney removal in New England was performed. Established by an act of the Massachusetts legislature in 1855, the hospital opened its doors in 1871 at a site in Jamaica Plain. In 1874 it moved into a newly built facility in the South End of Boston. Over the next 30 years, its facilities in that area were expanded, and in 1908 it opened a satellite facility in Brighton for the treatment of contagious diseases. The hospital eventually abandoned homeopathic practices, and in 1929 was renamed the Massachusetts Memorial Hospital to better conform to modern nomenclature.

In 1962 Massachusetts Memorial Hospitals merged with the Boston University Medical Center, now part of Boston Medical Center, in order "to provide and maintain better health in contemporary society." The hospital's main building survives, and is known as the Talbot Building; it now houses the Boston University School of Public Health.
