= Farmington, Maine =

- Town
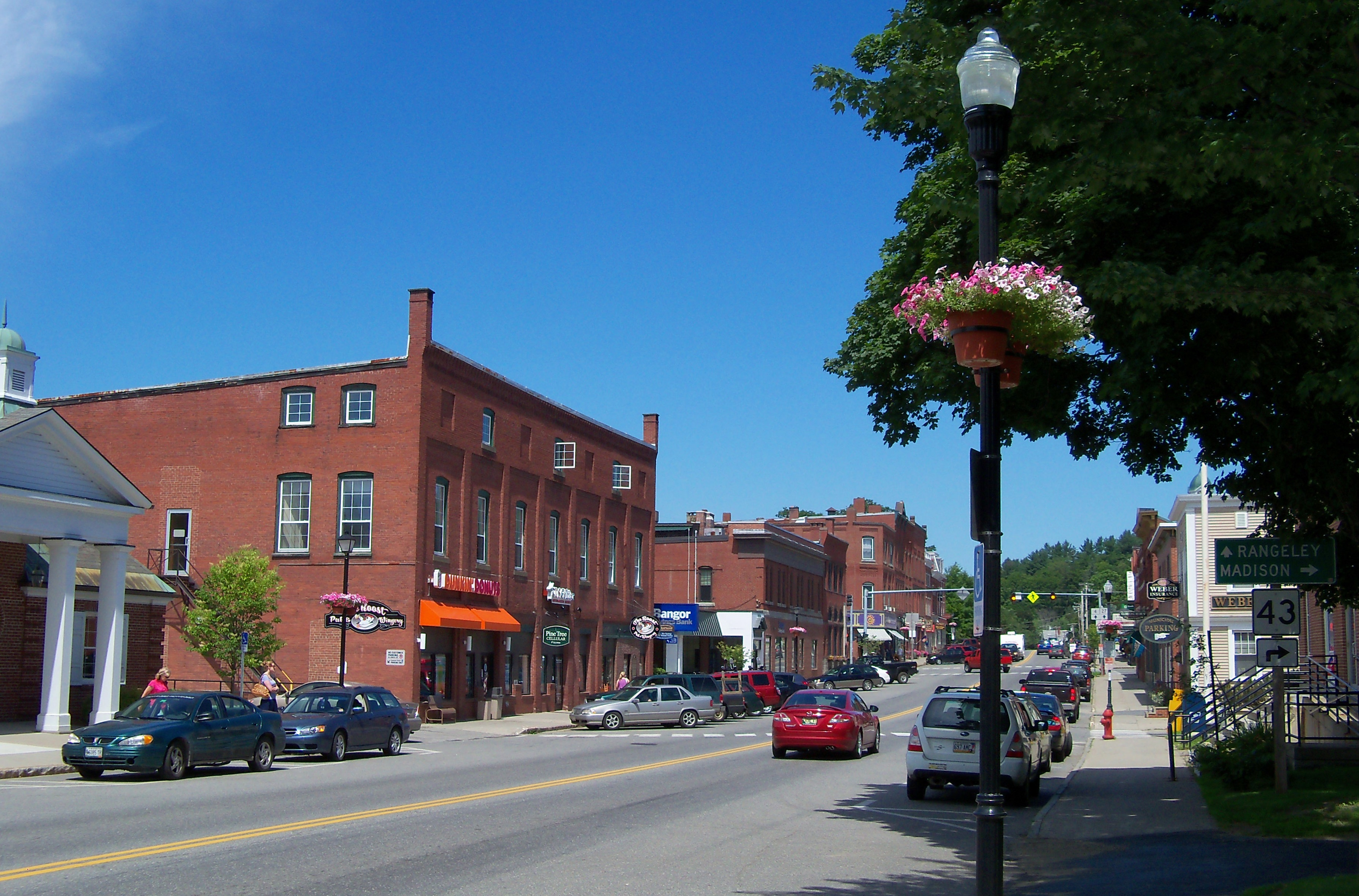
- Downtown Farmington

- Seal
- Nicknames: Farmtown, The Farm
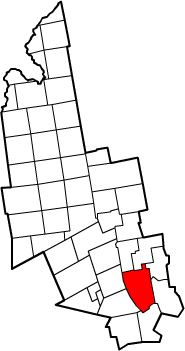
- Location in Franklin County, Maine

- Location within Maine Location within the United States
- Coordinates: 44°40′28″N 70°07′46″W
- Country: United States
- State: Maine
- County: Franklin
- Incorporated: February 1, 1794
- Villages: Farmington; Farmington Falls; Fairbanks; West Farmington

Area
  - Total: 55.82 sq mi (144.57 km^{2})
  - Land: 55.67 sq mi (144.18 km^{2})
  - Water: 0.15 sq mi (0.39 km^{2})
- Elevation: 430 ft (130 m)

Population (2020)
  - Total: 7,592
  - Density: 136/sq mi (52.7/km^{2})
- Time zone: UTC-5 (Eastern)
  - Summer (DST): UTC-4 (Eastern)
- ZIP Codes: 04938 (Farmington); 04940 (Farmington Falls); 04992 (West Farmington)
- Area code: 207
- GNIS feature ID: 582474
- Website: www.farmington-maine.org

Farmington is a town in and the county seat of Franklin County, Maine, United States. As of the 2020 census, its population was 7,592. Farmington is home to the University of Maine at Farmington, Nordica Memorial Auditorium, the Nordica Homestead, and the annual Farmington Fair.

== History ==
The area was once territory of the Canibas tribe of Abenaki Indians. They had two camps located near Farmington Falls, with fields cleared for cultivation of maize and potatoes named Amassokanty (Amesoquanty by the French). Their fort's stockade enclosed about an acre at the center of what is today Farmington Falls village.

A group from Topsham arrived in 1776 to explore the area and lay out a town, called Plantation No. 1 or Sandy River Plantation, but permanent settlement was delayed by the Revolutionary War.

In 1781, the first settlers arrived, the same year a sawmill was established. On February 1, 1794, Sandy River Plantation was incorporated as Farmington, named for its unusually fertile soil. Beginning with a cluster of log houses at Farmington Falls, the town grew quickly and prospered. Agriculture was an important early occupation, with hay a principal product. Orchards yielded apples and other fruit. Farmington became one of the largest wool producing towns in New England, with many herds of sheep grazing the hills and intervales.

The town's water power attracted industry, including five lumber mills, two sash, blind and door factories, two brickyards, a foundry, a rake factory, three gristmills, nearly a dozen carriage factories, a cheese factory, two corn canning factories, two reaper machine factories, a spool factory and a tannery. As a regional center for manufacturing, trade and agriculture, Farmington was designated county seat when Franklin County was formed in 1838. In 1859, the Androscoggin Railroad completed its line from Leeds Junction to Farmington, carrying freight and tourists.

In 1879, the town became the southern terminus for the narrow gauge Sandy River Railroad (later part of the Sandy River and Rangeley Lakes Railroad), making it a gateway to the Rangeley Lake and Sugarloaf Mountain areas. Farmington suffered a devastating fire on October 22, 1886, when thirty-three houses, nineteen stores, three churches, the county jail and the post office were destroyed. The 1877 Methodist Church designed by noted architect Arthur H. Vinal survived.

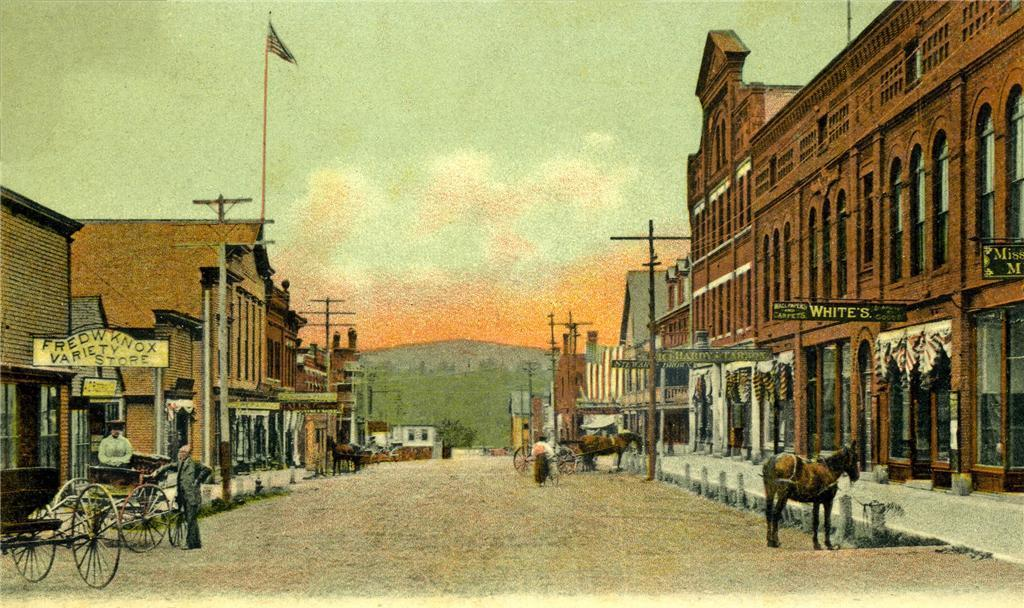
Broadway c. 1905

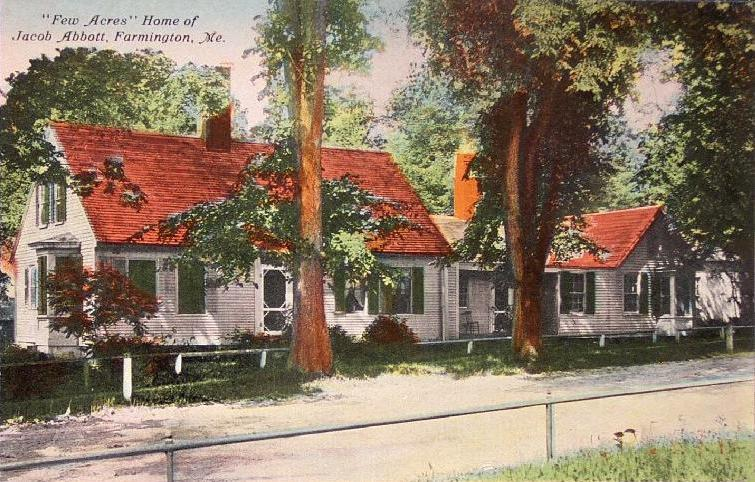
Jacob Abbott home in 1906

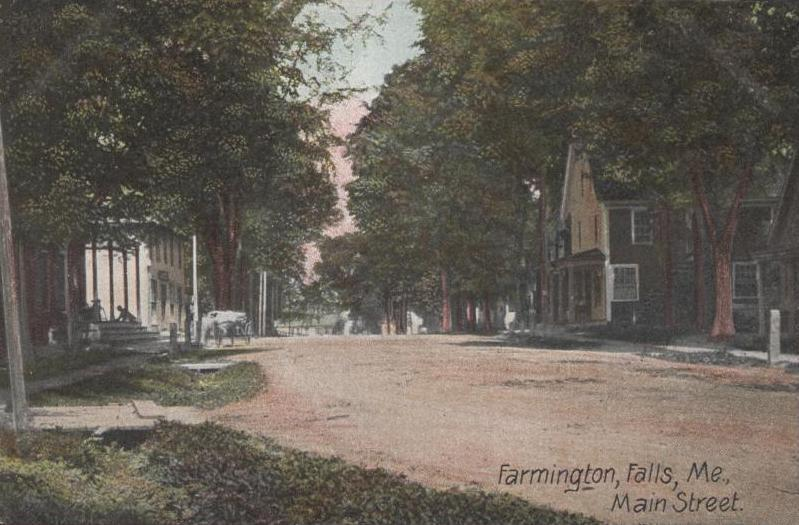
Farmington Falls in 1907

== Geography ==
According to the United States Census Bureau, the town has a total area of 55.82 square miles (144.57 km^{2}), of which 55.67 square miles (144.18 km^{2}) is land and 0.15 square miles (0.39 km^{2}) is water. Farmington is drained by Wilson Stream, Temple Stream, Beaver Brook and the Sandy River.

The town is crossed by U.S. Route 2 and Maine State Routes 4, 27, 43, 133 and 149. It borders the towns of Industry and New Sharon to the east, Chesterville to the south, Wilton to the southwest, Temple to the west, and Strong and New Vineyard to the north.

Farmington is divided into four local areas and sometimes mapped as such. They are West Farmington, Fairbanks, Farmington Falls, and Farmington (downtown). Each except Fairbanks has its own zip code, but all are within Farmington's town limits.

=== Climate ===
Typical for Maine, Farmington has a humid continental climate (Köppen Dfb) with cold (sometimes severely cold) winters and warm, often humid summers. Winters are cold and snowy, with forty nights per year under 0 °F or −17.8 °C and 68.6 days failing to top freezing. Snow cover peaks in February at typically around 18 inches or 0.46 metres, and the deepest snow cover on record is 84 inches or 2.13 metres on February 28, 1969. The coldest month since records began in 1893 was January 1982, with an average of 3.4 °F or −15.9 °C, and the hottest was July 1921, with an average of 73.3 °F or 22.9 °C, including 12 days over 90 °F or 32.2 °C, while the coldest winter was that of 1917–1918, with an average temperature of 10.45 °F or −12.0 °C. The hottest day was August 3, 1975, which reached 101 °F or 38.3 °C, while the coldest temperature was −39 °F or −39.4 °C on January 20, 1994.

Precipitation is abundant throughout the year, with snowfall especially heavy in winter. The wettest calendar month was December 1969, with 15.49 inches or 393.4 millimetres including 41.0 inches (1.04 m) of snow and a fall from a warm front of 9.97 inches or 253.2 millimetres of precipitation (mostly rain) on December 27 and 28. The snowiest season was from July 1968 to June 1969, with total snowfall of 164.0 inches or 4.17 metres, while the least snowy was from July 1980 to June 1981, with 43.0 inches or 1.09 metres.

Climate data for Farmington, Maine (1991–2020, extremes 1893–present)
Month	Jan	Feb	Mar	Apr	May	Jun	Jul	Aug	Sep	Oct	Nov	Dec	Year
Record high °F (°C)	62 (17)	61 (16)	83 (28)	90 (32)	100 (38)	100 (38)	104 (40)	102 (39)	100 (38)	90 (32)	79 (26)	65 (18)	104 (40)
Mean maximum °F (°C)	47.1 (8.4)	48.4 (9.1)	57.9 (14.4)	74.5 (23.6)	85.2 (29.6)	88.9 (31.6)	89.1 (31.7)	88.3 (31.3)	84.9 (29.4)	75.3 (24.1)	63.8 (17.7)	51.5 (10.8)	91.9 (33.3)
Mean daily maximum °F (°C)	26.8 (−2.9)	30.1 (−1.1)	38.9 (3.8)	52.3 (11.3)	65.4 (18.6)	73.6 (23.1)	78.6 (25.9)	77.4 (25.2)	69.9 (21.1)	56.9 (13.8)	44.1 (6.7)	32.8 (0.4)	53.9 (12.2)
Daily mean °F (°C)	16.2 (−8.8)	18.4 (−7.6)	28.4 (−2.0)	41.1 (5.1)	53.0 (11.7)	62.0 (16.7)	67.0 (19.4)	65.4 (18.6)	57.7 (14.3)	46.0 (7.8)	34.8 (1.6)	23.8 (−4.6)	42.8 (6.0)
Mean daily minimum °F (°C)	5.6 (−14.7)	6.8 (−14.0)	17.9 (−7.8)	30.0 (−1.1)	40.7 (4.8)	50.4 (10.2)	55.5 (13.1)	53.5 (11.9)	45.4 (7.4)	35.0 (1.7)	25.5 (−3.6)	14.8 (−9.6)	31.8 (−0.1)
Mean minimum °F (°C)	−16.8 (−27.1)	−14.5 (−25.8)	−5.9 (−21.1)	17.6 (−8.0)	27.3 (−2.6)	36.7 (2.6)	43.3 (6.3)	40.9 (4.9)	29.8 (−1.2)	21.7 (−5.7)	9.0 (−12.8)	−6.0 (−21.1)	−19.7 (−28.7)
Record low °F (°C)	−39 (−39)	−37 (−38)	−25 (−32)	−2 (−19)	20 (−7)	27 (−3)	32 (0)	29 (−2)	20 (−7)	11 (−12)	−14 (−26)	−36 (−38)	−39 (−39)
Average precipitation inches (mm)	3.53 (90)	3.15 (80)	3.99 (101)	4.34 (110)	3.87 (98)	5.09 (129)	3.96 (101)	4.05 (103)	3.51 (89)	5.21 (132)	4.44 (113)	4.31 (109)	49.45 (1,256)
Average snowfall inches (cm)	20.7 (53)	22.9 (58)	18.8 (48)	5.3 (13)	0.2 (0.51)	0.0 (0.0)	0.0 (0.0)	0.0 (0.0)	0.0 (0.0)	0.3 (0.76)	4.9 (12)	20.8 (53)	93.9 (239)
Average extreme snow depth inches (cm)	20.4 (52)	26.4 (67)	25.4 (65)	9.5 (24)	0.1 (0.25)	0.0 (0.0)	0.0 (0.0)	0.0 (0.0)	0.0 (0.0)	0.3 (0.76)	2.8 (7.1)	12.9 (33)	31.9 (81)
Average precipitation days (≥ 0.01 in)	11.0	9.3	11.1	11.4	12.9	12.7	12.7	11.5	10.0	11.7	11.5	12.9	138.7
Average snowy days (≥ 0.1 in)	7.5	6.8	5.7	2.3	0.1	0.0	0.0	0.0	0.0	0.3	2.8	7.1	32.6
Source: NOAA

== Demographics ==
Historical population
Census	Pop.	Note	%±
1800	942		—
1810	1,639		74.0%
1820	1,938		18.2%
1830	2,341		20.8%
1840	2,613		11.6%
1850	2,725		4.3%
1860	3,106		14.0%
1870	3,251		4.7%
1880	3,353		3.1%
1890	3,207		−4.4%
1900	3,288		2.5%
1910	3,210		−2.4%
1920	3,197		−0.4%
1930	3,600		12.6%
1940	3,743		4.0%
1950	4,677		25.0%
1960	5,001		6.9%
1970	5,657		13.1%
1980	6,730		19.0%
1990	7,436		10.5%
2000	7,410		−0.3%
2010	7,760		4.7%
2020	7,592		−2.2%
U.S. Decennial Census

=== 2010 census ===
As of the census of 2010, there were 7,760 people, 3,072 households, and 1,597 families residing in the town. The population density was 139.4 inhabitants per square mile (53.8/km^{2}). There were 3,441 housing units at an average density of 61.8 per square mile (23.9/km^{2}). The racial makeup of the town was 96.9% White, 0.3% African American, 0.4% Native American, 0.3% Asian, 0.1% Pacific Islander, 0.3% from other races, and 1.7% from two or more races. Hispanic or Latino of any race were 1.3% of the population.

There were 3,072 households, of which 23.1% had children under the age of 18 living with them, 38.2% were married couples living together, 9.9% had a female householder with no husband present, 3.9% had a male householder with no wife present, and 48.0% were non-families. 34.1% of all households were made up of individuals, and 13% had someone living alone who was 65 years of age or older. The average household size was 2.17 and the average family size was 2.75.

The median age in the town was 32.1 years. 16% of residents were under the age of 18; 27.2% were between the ages of 18 and 24; 18.3% were from 25 to 44; 23.3% were from 45 to 64; and 15.5% were 65 years of age or older. The gender makeup of the town was 45.3% male and 54.7% female.

=== 2000 census ===
As of the census of 2000, there were 7,410 people, 2,813 households, and 1,533 families residing in the town. The population density was 132.8 inhabitants per square mile (51.3/km^{2}). There were 3,048 housing units at an average density of 54.6 persons/sq mi (21.1 persons/km^{2}). The racial makeup of the town was 97.48% White, 0.20% African American, 0.30% Native American, 0.65% Asian, 0.03% Pacific Islander, 0.40% from other races, and 0.94% from two or more races. 0.82% of the population were Hispanic or Latino of any race.

There were 2,813 households, out of which 24.8% had children under the age of 18 living with them, 42.5% were married couples living together, 9.1% have a woman whose husband does not live with her, and 45.5% were non-families. 31.7% of all households were made up of individuals, and 11.8% had someone living alone who was 65 years of age or older. The average household size was 2.25 and the average family size was 2.87.

In the town, the population was spread out, with 18.4% under the age of 18, 25.0% from 18 to 24, 21.5% from 25 to 44, 19.3% from 45 to 64, and 15.9% who were 65 years of age or older. The median age was 32 years. For every 100 females, there were 81.0 males. For every 100 females age 18 and over, there were 75.1 males.

The median income for a household in the town was $26,814, and the median income for a family was $33,656. Males had a median income of $27,569 versus $21,101 for females. The per capita income for the town was $13,982. About 18.0% of families and 22.6% of the population were below the poverty line, including 30.6% of those under the age of 18 and 5.4% ages 65 or older.

== Government ==
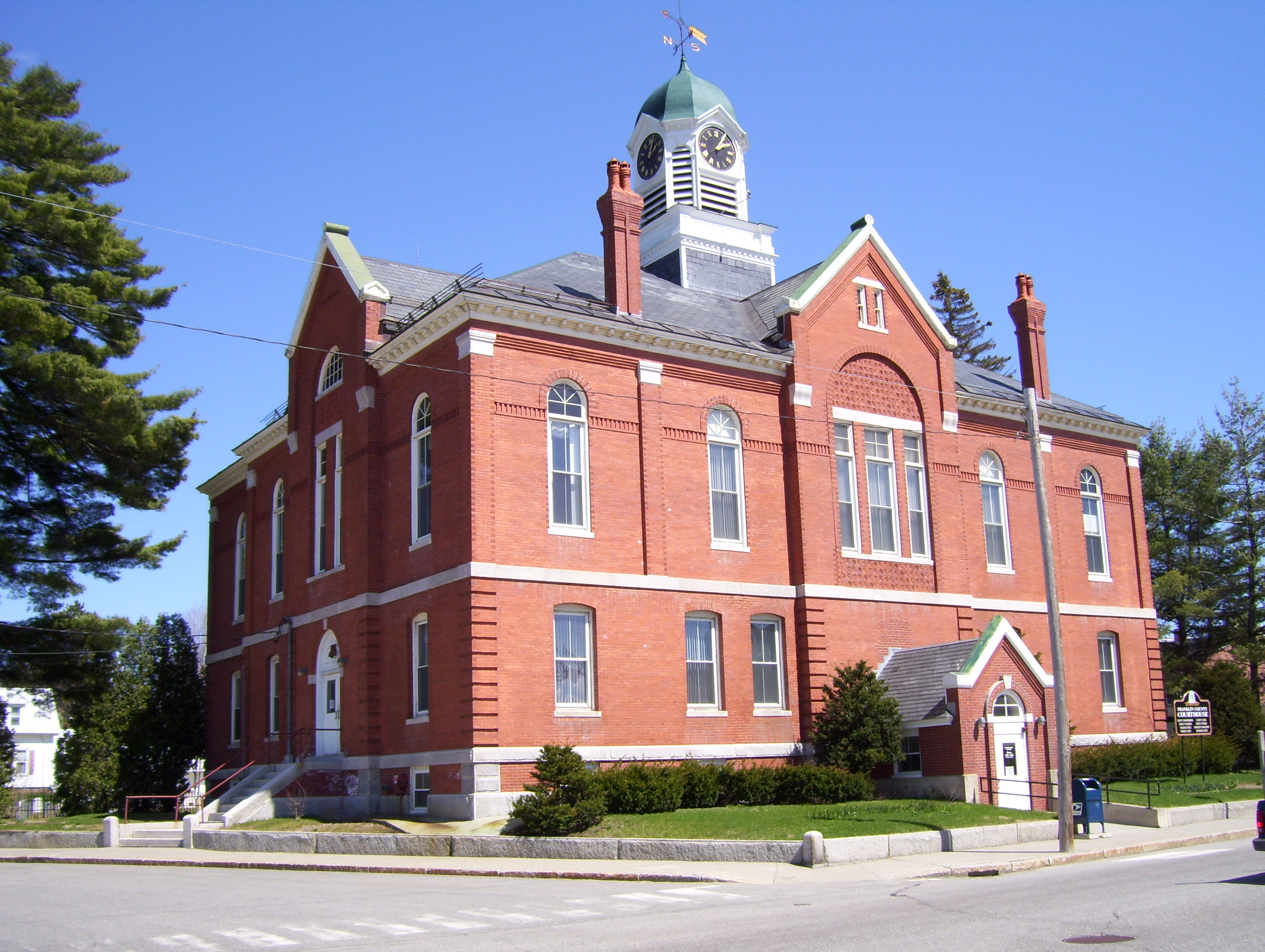
Franklin County Courthouse

Farmington is the county seat and largest town in Franklin County. It has regional administrative buildings including a courthouse. It is governed by a board of selectmen who meet biweekly. Daily administration is by a town manager, and the town holds an annual town meeting in March.

== Notable sites ==
- Sandy River
- Mount Blue Middle School
- University of Maine at Farmington
- Cutler Memorial Library
- First Congregational Church, United Church of Christ
- Franklin County Courthouse
- Free Will Baptist Meetinghouse
- Greenacre, a historic house
- Chester Greenwood House
- Old Union Meetinghouse
- Hiram Ramsdell House

== University of Maine at Farmington ==
Farmington is home to The University of Maine at Farmington, part of Maine's public university system. UMF had a full-time enrollment of 1,800 in 2016.

== Prophecy ==
Farmington is the subject of a prophecy by the Quaker Licia Kuenning (formerly Lisa Bieberman) about a Coming New Order in the town. This was originally prophesied for Tuesday, June 6, 2006 but, after gathering more than 80 people together with no apparent miracles on that date, was then (2012) prophesied "within the next few years".

== Notable people ==
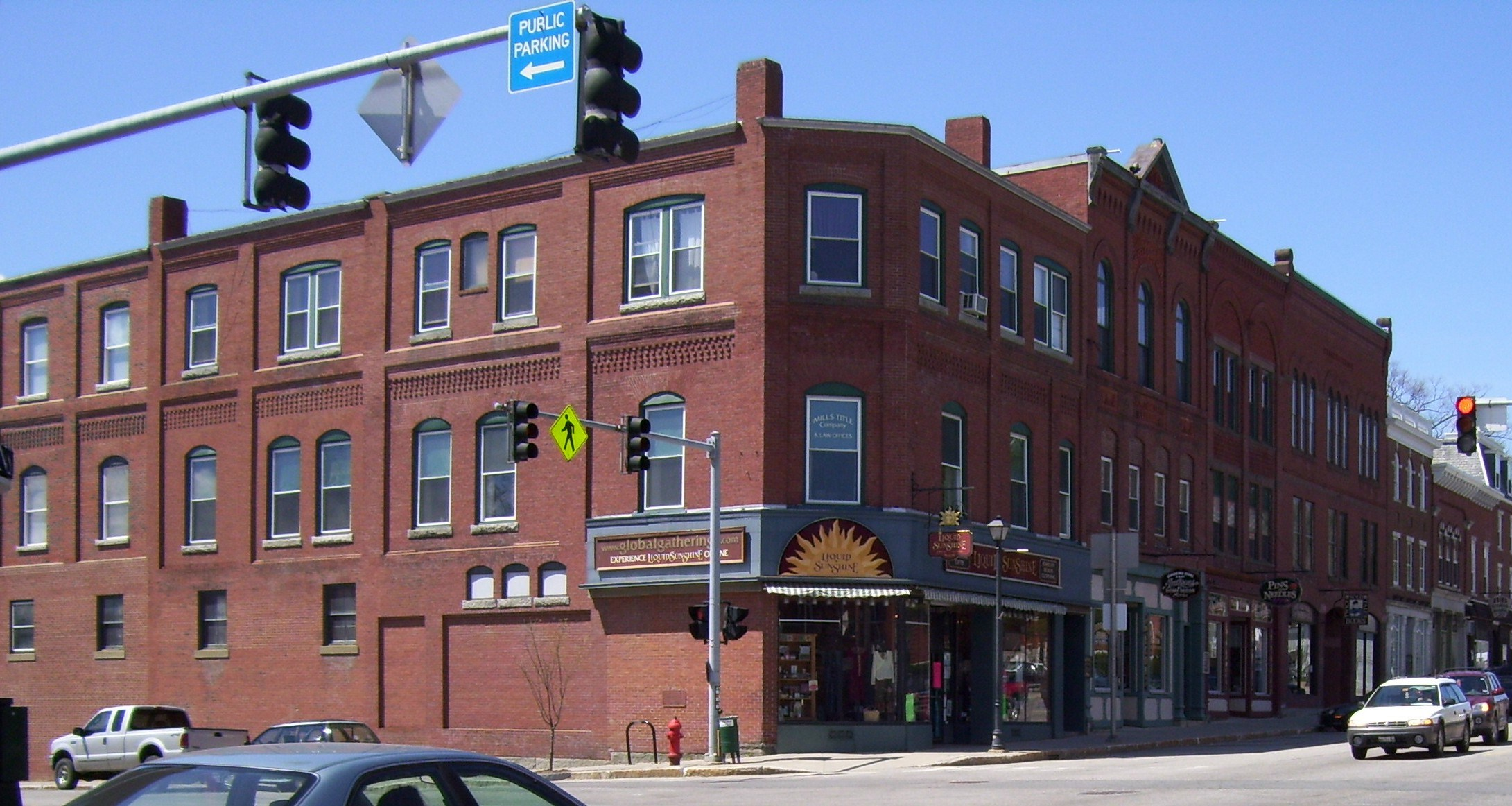
View of downtown

- Edward Abbott, clergyman, journalist, author
- Jacob Abbott, author, educator
- Elizabeth Akers Allen, author, journalist, poet
- Nellie Greenwood Andrews, Canadian suffragist
- Hiram Belcher, US congressman
- Supply Belcher, composer, musician
- Nathan Cutler, politician
- Robert Goodenow, US congressman
- Walter Gooley, state legislator
- Chester Greenwood, the inventor of earmuffs
- Wilhelmina Harper, librarian and author
- S. Clifton Ives, Methodist bishop
- H. Scott Landry (born 1948 or 1949), politician
- Julia Harris May (1833–1912), founder of May School in Farmington
- Florence Percy McIntyre (1855–1923), short story writer, journalist, and clubwoman
- Janet Mills, Governor of Maine, former state attorney general
- Peter Mills, politician
- Samuel P. Morrill, US congressman and minister
- Lillian Nordica, singer
- Thomas Parker, Judge, early donor to Bates College
- Dan Simoneau, cross country skier
- Charlie Webster, state legislator and Chair of the Maine Republican Party
- Seth Wescott, first Olympic gold medalist in Snowboard Cross
- Henry Clay Wood, U.S. Army officer who received the Medal of Honor during the American Civil War
- Chandler Woodcock, state senator

== See also ==
- WUMF-FM
- WKTJ-FM
