= Dick Cerri =

American disc jockey

- Born: Richard Anthony Cerri; June 1, 1936; Utica, New York, United States
- Died: October 3, 2013 (aged 77); Silver Spring, Maryland, United States
- Occupation: Radio personality
- Years active: 1960–1995
- Spouse: Eleanor Frates
- Children: Debbi Cerri
- Parent(s): Dominick J. Cerri and Mildred May Issac

Richard Anthony Cerri (June 1, 1936 – October 3, 2013) was an American folk music disc jockey in Washington, D.C. between 1960 and 1995.

Cerri was born in Utica, New York, on June 1, 1936, the younger of two children of Dominick J. Cerri and his wife Mildred May Isaac. Cerri started out in high school as an announcer in Utica on WIBX and moved to ABC affiliate WRUN where he remained through college. He graduated in 1959 from Utica College.

He moved to Washington, D.C. in 1960 and soon after was employed at WAVA-FM, where he created the show "Music Americana, the Folk Music of America". Cerri hosted and produced at several area radio stations, including WHFS and WJMD-FM which changed call sign to WLTT-FM where the name of his show was shortened to "Music Americana". He was at WETA-FM from 1970 to 1973 where his brother Bill was also a disc jockey, well known for his classical music show.

Cerri had a very humble view of his reputation as an expert, instead typifying his role as a spectator, albeit a professional one.

Cerri started the World Folk Music Association with singer-songwriter Tom Paxton in 1982 and Cerri served as its president for much of its existence. In the 1980s and 1990s, Cerri also sponsored monthly musical concerts using the name of his radio show "Music Americana."

Cerri retired in the mid-1990s and continued working with the World Folk Music Association (WFMA). He was most recently working on digitizing his "Music Americana" radio shows, a project announced at the "Remembering Dick Cerri: A Celebration in Song", will be completed by the WFMA Foundation. The extent of his influence can be gauged by the musicians at the September 27, 2014 concert: Noel Paul Stookey, Peter Yarrow (from Peter, Paul and Mary), Chad Mitchell, Christine Lavin, Schooner Fare, Squid Jiggers (Dave Rowe & Troy R. Bennett), Donal Leace, Modern Man (Rob Carlson, George Wurzbach and David Buskin), Tom Paxton, Steve Gillette and Cindy Mangsen, Bill Danoff, Mack Bailey, Anne Hills, Carolyn Hester and daughters Amy Blume and Karla Blume, Jonathan Edwards and Side By Side (Doris Justis and Sean McGhee).
