= Batteau =

Batteau or Bateau may refer to:

== People ==
- Laurent Bateau, French actor
- Sean Bateau (1986-), Trinidadian footballer
- Sheldon Bateau (1991-), Trinidadian footballer
- David Batteau (1949-), American singer-songwriter
- Dwight Wayne Batteau (1916-1967), American researcher on external ears and human-dolphin communication
- Robin Batteau (1948-), American musician

== Places ==
- Batteau, Newfoundland and Labrador
- Bateau Bay, suburb of Central Coast region of New South Wales, Australia

== Other ==
- Bateau, a type of boat
- Bateau (horse)
- Bateau (restaurant), steakhouse in Seattle
- Le Bateau paper-cut by Matisse
- Le Bateau ivre, poem by Rimbaud
- Bateau-Lavoir, building in Montmartre
- Bateaux Mouches, excursion boats in Paris
- Petit Bateau, French clothing brand for children

== Alternate spellings ==
- Batteux, surname
- Batou, Ghosties in the Shell character
- Batuo, first abbot of the Shaolin Monastery
