= Fires of Eden (album) =

Studio album by Judy Collins
- Released: September 1990
- Genre: Pop rock; folk
- Length: 49:00
- Label: Columbia
- Producer: Joel Dorn; Lucy Simon

Judy Collins chronology
Sanity and Grace (1989)	Fires of Eden (1990)	Baby's Bedtime (1990)

Singles from Fires of Eden
- 1. "Fires of Eden" Released: October 1990

Professional ratings
Review scores
Source	Rating
AllMusic	4/5 stars
The Encyclopedia of Popular Music	2/5 stars
Entertainment Weekly	B
The Rolling Stone Album Guide	3/5 stars

Fires of Eden is the eighteenth studio album by American singer Judy Collins, released in September 1990 by Columbia Records. It was Collins's first and only release for Columbia. The album was produced by Joel Dorn and Lucy Simon.

== Overview ==
For the album, Collins wrote the album's opening seven-minute track "The Blizzard"; she also contributed to the songs "Fortune of Soldiers", "Home Before Dark", "City of Cities", "Queen of the Night", mostly with songwriters Robin Batteau and David Buskin. A studio version of the song "From a Distance" was included; it was presented on the previous album in a live version.

The album failed to chart in any country, but the title track single peaked at number 31 on the Adult Contemporary chart.

== Track listing ==
No.	Title	Writer(s)	Length
1.	"The Blizzard"	Judy Collins	7:31
2.	"Fortune of Soldiers"	Robin Batteau; David Buskin; Collins	4:15
3.	"Test of Time"	Batteau; Judy David; Collins	5:12
4.	"Fires of Eden"	Mark Goldenberg; Kit Hain	4:20
5.	"Home Before Dark"	Batteau; Buskin; Collins	4:30
6.	"The Air That I Breathe"	Albert Hammond; Mike Hazelwood	4:22
7.	"City of Cities"	Batteau; Buskin; Collins	3:35
8.	"Dreaming"	Amanda McBroom	4:27
9.	"Queen of the Night"	Batteau; Buskin; Collins	4:06
10.	"From a Distance"	Julie Gold	4:14
11.	"The Blizzard" (Reprise)	Collins	2:18
Total length:			49:00
