= Music of Maine =

The state of Maine is located in the New England region of the northeastern United States. Its musical traditions extend back at least 13,000 years to the music of the first peoples of Maine, the Penobscot Passamaquoddy, Wabanaki and other related Indigenous cultures.

== Classical music ==
In the colonial era, the talented composer, singer and compiler of tune books, Supply Belcher (1751–1836), a Maine resident, was known in his time as "the Handel of Maine". Belcher organized the first choir in Farmington, Maine.

Neoclassical composer Walter Piston (1894–1976) was born and raised in Rockland before moving to Boston at the age of ten.

== Popular music ==
Maine is home to many talented singers, songwriters, band leaders and composers. Composers from Maine include Charles Whitney Coombs, John Knowles Paine, Frank Churchill, Aaron Robinson, Claude Demetrius, Peter Garland, and Harold J. Crosby.

Rudy Vallée grew up in Westbrook. His career started as a saxophone player and singer, later becoming a band leader. He also helped Alice Faye and Frances Langford start their careers and appeared on Broadway for a time. Vallée also attended the University of Maine.

Born in Fort Fairfield, country musician Dick Curless was a singer, songwriter and guitarist. His biggest hit, "A Tombstone Every Mile", was a song about a stretch of road in Northern Maine. He was an inaugural member of the Maine Country Music Hall Of Fame, located in Mechanic Falls. The Dick Curless Memorial Scholarship Fund has been established to support young Maine musicians.

Donald Doane Sr. is another member of the Maine Country Music Hall of Fame, born in Kennebunk in 1907. His band, the Kahtadin Mountaineers, was formed in the early 1950s and still performs regularly today at county fairs, fiddle contests and for many charities. The Windham Community Church was built from charity proceeds. The group has also played with singer Kate Smith, best known for her rendition of "God Bless America" (written by Irving Berlin).

Howie Day, who grew-up in Brewer, made it to the top 20 of the Billboard Hot 100 in June 2004 with "Collide".

== Music venues and institutions ==
Major music venues in Maine include the University of Southern Maine, Corthell Hall, Gorham, Maine, Portland's Merrill Auditorium, State Theatre, One Longfellow Square, Port City Music Hall, Portland House of Music and Events, Stone Mountain Arts Center in Brownfield, North Atlantic Blues Festival in Rockland, The Chocolate Church Arts Center in Bath, Bar Harbor Music Festival, American Folk Festival in Bangor, Bay Chambers Summer Music Festival in Rockport, Bowdoin International Music Festival, Kneisel Hall Chamber Music Festival, Portland Chamber Music Festival, Salt Bay Chamberfest in Damariscotta, Sebago – Long Lake Music Festival in Harrison, Saltwater Celtic Music Festival, Ossipee Valley Music Festival in South Hiram, East Benton Fiddlers Festival and Contest, Sweet Chariot Music Festival on Swan's Island, Saddleback Mountain Bluegrass Festival, Frantasia at the University of Maine at Farmington, Treat Memorial Library in Livermore Falls, American Folk Festival in Bangor, Thomas Point Beach Bluegrass Festival in Brunswick, the Gamper Festival of Contemporary Music in Bowdoin and the Sebago – Long Lake Festival Players.

Maine is home to several prominent professional organizations, including the Portland Symphony Orchestra, the Bangor Symphony Orchestra, the Maine Country Music Association Hall of Fame, the Down East Country Musical Association and the Maine Academy of Country Music. The Maine State Music Theater in Brunswick has operated since 1959 and is one of three professional music theaters in the state; the others are Northport Music Theater in Northport, which opened in 2007, and Ogunquit Playhouse in Ogunguit, which opened in 1933.

Portland is also home to the Portland Choral Arts Society and the Portland String Quartet. The DaPonte String Quartet is the only other professional string quartet in Maine. The Portland Opera Repertory Theatre and Opera Maine are the main outlets for opera in the state.

Outside of Portland, there are pockets of people who preserve the traditional musical styles of their ancestors, including the Swedish music of Stockholm and New Sweden, the French-Maine community (especially in Upper St. John Valley, home to the Acadian Festival) and the ethnic Russian music of the Kennebec River community in Richmond.

Maine's musical heritage also include the longstanding men's a cappella group, the Meddiebempsters, at Bowdoin College, and Bates College's all-male Manic Optimists.

Original compositions about Maine and by Maine composers are stored in the Maine Collection at the Bagaduce Music Lending Library in Blue Hill. With over 225,000 separate titles, this library houses the largest publicly available sheet-music collection in North America.

== Folk, country, and bluegrass music ==
Maine has a long folk fiddling tradition, including Mellie Dunham, which has helped inspire many modern bluegrass musicians. Maine's bluegrass and fiddling tradition is celebrated at the Eastern Maine Music Festival. There is also a Bluegrass Music Association of Maine. Maine's contributions to bluegrass include Clarence and Roland White of the Kentucky Colonels and Jimmy Cox.

Many prominent singer-songwriters grew up in Maine, including Patty Griffin, Ellis Paul, Slaid Cleaves, David Mallett and Rod Picott. Cleaves and Picott were childhood friends in South Berwick. Randy Browning of the Late Bloomer moved to South Berwick.

The Freewill Folk Society at Bates College also continues the folk tradition. There are also more traditional folk acts such as Schooner Fare, Maine's best-known folk trio-turned-duo following the death of Tom Rowe in 2004, and the Dave Rowe Trio, founded by the late Tom Rowe's son. The Maritime- and Celtic-inspired folk duo Castlebay continues these traditions by researching archives for songs and ballads sung in Maine and performing them. In addition, members Julia Lane and Fred Gosbee write and perform songs about Maine's people and history. Newer Maine-based progressive folk artists have been emerging since the 1990s, including Heather Caston and Nancy Cartonio.

Maine's religious music includes the well-known church choirs of St. Luke's Episcopal Cathedral and two Bangor-area churches both named after St. John (one Catholic and one Episcopal).

One Longfellow Square in Portland is a popular folk-music venue.

Contra dances abound throughout the state of Maine keeping a tradition vital. Live bands often include fiddle, guitar, piano, banjo, mandolin, bass, and more.

Maine's folk tradition is celebrated and kept alive in summer camps such as Maine Fiddle Camp in Montville. The Acadia School of Traditional Music and Arts (the Acadia Trad School) operates a week-long festival in June that attracts serious music and dance students of all ages from all across the US, Canada and beyond.

Maine's musicians play a variety of different styles of folk music. Irish, Scottish, Quebecois, and even southern styles were influential on Maine's folk tradition. French-Canadian music is popular in Northern Maine on the border of Canada. The traditional fiddle tunes extended into Maine and became very prominent in all of New England.

The only music museum east of Nashville is located in Mechanic Falls. The Maine Country Music Hall of Fame was founded in 1978 and in 2008 they opened a museum.

== Blues ==
Blues pianist Bob Page was from Damariscotta. Harmonica player and singer Jason Ricci is from Portland.

== Jazz ==
The southern coastal region both in and near Portland, Maine is home to many jazz instrumentalists, composers, singers, songwriters and arrangers. The University of Southern Maine at Gorham campus offers many jazz concerts throughout the academic year.

Lenny Breau, born in Auburn in 1941, is often considered to have been the most gifted jazz guitarist of all time. He was also a very well versed classical guitar player, known for his distinctive fingerstyle technique and ability to incorporate two-note comping, harmonics, quartal harmony and three-against-two rhythms. He was also known for blending jazz, flamenco, classical and country styles. During his lifetime, Breau recorded albums such as The Hallmark Sessions, Swingin' on a Seven String and Guitar Sounds. Some of his most memorable tunes are "Bouree", "The Claw" and "Emily", performed in Brunswick on August 2, 1980. Breau died in Los Angeles in 1984.

Don Doane, a jazz trombonist and music teacher within the Maine school system, has played with Woody Herman and Maynard Ferguson.

Dave Bowler, a professional jazz drummer born in 1957 in Portland, helped found the jazz/rock band the Franklin Street Arterial and recorded an album called Blue Hills. He has played with other well-known musicians such as Willie Nelson, Willie Dixon and Kilimandjaro. He also became a member of the Ahmad Jamal Trio.

Pianist, arranger and composer John Benson Brooks was born in Houlton.

== Rock ==
Punk rock band Pinkerton Thugs formed in Kennebunk.

Alternative rock band As Fast As, indie rock bands Rustic Overtones, Paranoid Social Club, Phantom Buffalo, Big Blood, hardcore punk band Cruel Hand, and rock band 6Gig, among others, are from Portland. Portland is also home to many venues catering to the city's underground punk, indie, and experimental rock scene, including the Apohadion Theater, Sun Tiki Studios, and Geno's Rock Club. One of the more prominent acts to come out of the state is the indie rock band Weakened Friends, who were named "Unsigned Artist of the Year" in 2017's Boston Music Awards and collaborated with J Mascis of Dinosaur Jr. on the track Hate Mail.

The DIY venue, the Squashed Warehouse, is revered among punk musicians and commonly hosts hardcore, pop punk, folk punk, and noise rock shows, having been played by national and local acts including folk punk outfit Days N' Daze, underground ska-core act Grey Matter, and many of the groups mentioned above. Another DIY Venue, Project Freewill, in New Portland, Maine, celebrates underground musicians in Maine.

== Hip-hop ==
Two founding members of the label Anticon were from Maine, Alias from Hollis, and Sole from Portland.

Spose was born in Portland and grew up in Wells.
