= Rosalie Sorrels discography =

This is a discography for folk musician Rosalie Sorrels. It includes albums where she is the principal performer as well as tribute albums, retrospective albums, and compilation albums for a genre of music.

== Albums—Primary vocal performer ==
Album information
Rosalie Sorrels Sings Songs of the Mormon Pioneers
- Release Date: 1961
- Record label: Festival Records (USA)
- Studio album, Thematic, Traditional songs
- Notes: Rosalie Sorrels (vocals) with Jim Sorrels and the Singing Saints. Most songs are from the collection of Austin E. and Alta S. Fife.
- Songs: — Songs: None can preach the gospel like the Mormons do—The gospel news — A poor wayfaring man of grief—Tittery-irie-ay—On the road to California—The lonesome roving wolves—The dying Californian—The handcart song—The unknown grave—Whoa! Haw! Buck and jerry boy—Hard times come again no more—Don't you marry the Mormon boys—Blue Mountain—Once I lived in Cottonwood—Seagulls and crickets—Zack, the Mormon engineer—Echo Canyon—St. George and the drag-on—Mormon yankee doodle
Rosalie's Songbag
- Release Date: 1961
- Record label: Prestige Records (13025)
- Studio album; Traditional songs
- Notes: Rosalie Sorrels, vocals and guitar; in part with Jim Sorrels, guitar.
- Songs: Bucking bronco—Fourth of July—Babies—Girls of constant sorrow—Two sisters—Rock salt and nails—The unknown grave—Find a wife—Willie and John—No one knows me—Rags to my back—Awful, o how awful—The female highwayman—The haunted hunter—Mormon Sunday school
Folk Songs of Idaho and Utah
- Release Date: 1961
- Record label: Folkways Records (5343)
- Studio album, Thematic, Traditional songs
- Notes: Sung by Rosalie Sorrels, with Jim Sorrels, guitar.
- Songs: The lineman's hymn — Brigham Young—Winter song—Death of Kathy Fiscus—I'll give you my story—The girl that played Injun with me—Utah's Dixie—Empty cots in the bunkhouse tonight—Tying knots in the devil's tail—The fox—Way out in Idaho—My last cigar—The wreck of the old Number Nine—The house carpenter—The wild colonial boy—I left my baby—The Philadelphia lawyer.
Somewhere Between
- Release Date: 1967
- Record label: Boise Unitarian Universalist Fellowship (TAD 3080)
- Studio album
- Notes: Rosalie Sorrels, vocals and guitar; with accompanying musicians. Recorded by Don Cederstrom Custom Recording, Boise, Idaho.
- Songs: Magic penny (1:52) — It could be a wonderful world (1:16) — My father's mansion (3:03) — Mighty river (2:43) — Ain't you got a right (2:28) — Pale green disease (2:04) — Pig hollow (2:36) — I saw my country's flag go down (3:14) — Simple gifts (1:42) — If I were free (2:28) — Death of Ellenton (2:15) — Judas ram (2:08) — Enola Gay (3:31) — Killing ground (2:13) — The miracle (1:46) — Somewhere between (2:47).
If I Could Be the rain
- Release Date: 1967
- Record label: Folk-Legacy Records (FSI-31)
- Studio album
- Notes: Songs by Utah Phillips and Rosalie Sorrels, sung by Sorrels with Mitch Greenhill, guitar.
- Songs: Go With Me—Goodbye Joe Hill—I Think of You—If I Could Be the Rain—Il Pleure—In the Quiet Country of Your Eyes—I've Got a Home Out In Utah—Jesse's Corrido—One More Next Time—Some Other Place, Some Other Time—Starlight on the Rails—Up Is a Nice Place to Be—Walking Down That Lonely Street
Travelin' Lady
- Release Date: 1972
- Record label: Sire Records (5902)
- Studio album
- Notes: Mitch Greenhill, Mayne Smith, Mike Woodward, Lee Poundstone, Sid Page and Will Scarlett. Liner notes from Hunter S. Thompson.
- Songs: Traveling Lady—They'll Know Who I Am—Come Talk To Me—All I Ever Do Is Say Goodbye—Postcard From India—Rock Me To Sleep—Lovin' Of The Game—She Can Do Without You—Occasional Man—He Doesn't See Me—Rosalie, You Can't Go Home Again
Whatever Happened to the Girl that Was
- Release Date: 1973
- Record label: Paramount (6072)
- Studio album
- Notes: Rosalie Sorrels, vocals; Mitch Greenhill, guitars; Eric Kaz and David Holt, keyboard instruments; Harvey Brooks, electric bass and guitarron; Dave Holland, acoustic bass; Greg Thomas, drums./ Recorded at Bearsville Studios, Bearsville, New York, April, 1973.
- Songs: Just a country girl—Nobody's—Roadrunner #2—Too many strangers—Come and be my driver—Elegant hobo—First fall of snow—Hall of fame—Rock, salt and nails (Bruce Phillips)—Another woman's man—The toast—Brightwood fire
Always a Lady
- Release Date: 1975
- Record label: Philo Records
- Studio album
- Notes: Rosalie Sorrels, vocals & guitar; Roma Baran, lead guitar; Jay Ungar, fiddle & mandolin; Geoff Outlaw, mandolin (7th work); Lyn Hardy, backup vocals; Tony Markellis, bass. Album notes by Malvina Reynolds.
- Songs: Mehitabel's theme—Baby rocking medley—Song for David—Hey little girl—Apple of my eye—The caterpillar & the butterlfly—Did I knock—Red wine at noon—When I was in my prime—Song for my birthday—The moth
Travelin' Lady Rides Again
- Release Date: 1978
- Record label: Philo Records (1049) (Re-released by Green Linnet Records in 1997)
- Studio album
- Notes: Rosalie Sorrels, vocals and guitar; Bruce Carver, guitar; Jeff Salisbury, drums; Winnie Winston, pedal steel guitar and banjo; Jeff Gutcheon, piano; Peter Madcat Ruth, harmonica, jaw harp; Jim Tullio, acoustic bass./ Recorded March 1978, Earth Audio Techniques, North Ferrisburg, Vt.
- Songs: — Traveling Lady (Rosalie Sorrels) — I Like It (Mayne Smith) — We Were Kinda Crazy Then (Susanna Clark) — Trucker's Cafe (Sylvia Tyson) — Going Away (Bruce Phillips) — I Remember Loving You (Bruce Phillips) — Talkin' Wolverine 14 (Bruce Phillips & Andy Cohen) — Feather Ben (Peter Bowen) — Bad Girl's Lament (Traditional) — Post Card From India (Rosalie Sorrels)
Moments of Happiness
- Release Date: 1976
- Record label: Philo Records (1033)
- Studio album
- Notes: Songs, vocals and guitar by Rosalie Sorrells, with Mitch Greenhill (guitar), Jeff Gutcheon (piano, organ), John Payne (woodwinds), Evan Stover (fiddle), Tony Markellis (bass guitar) and Steve Mosley (drums). recorded at Earth Audio Techniques in North Ferrisburg, Vermont, 1976–1977.
- Songs: — Moments of happiness—Falling in love again, can't help it—Ain't nobody got the blues like me—Green firefalls—Truth is on the streets—Just one more cowboy—Singing in the country—High flyin' wonder—See you stand that way—Up is a nice place to be
Lonesome Roving Wolves : Songs & Ballads of the West
- Release Date: 1980 (Re-release 1993 on CD)
- Record label: Green Linnet (1024)
- Studio album; traditional songs
- Notes: Liner notes by Rosalie Sorrels and Hedy West. This album features Sorrels as an interpreter of traditional material. Many are Mormon pioneer songs collected by Rosalie during her years in Salt Lake City.
- Songs: — The Lonesome Roving Wolves—Don't You Marry the Mormon Boys—Brigham Young] — Christine LeRoy—The Merry Mormons—The Haunted Hunter—Winter Song—Logan's Lament—Juanita—Awful, Oh How Awful—The Star of Bannock—State of Arkansas—Fourth of July—Jerusalem—Basque Christmas Song
Miscellaneous Abstract Record #1
- Release Date: 1982 (Re-release 1993 on CD)
- Record label: Green Linnet (1042)
- Studio album
- Notes: Rosalie Sorrels, vocals and guitar; with instrumental accompaniment. All songs recorded at Golden East Recording Studios, New Canaan, Connecticut except If you love me recorded live at The Barn Coffeehouse, Westport, Connecticut. This is a collection of the artist's favorite songs.
- Songs: Ashes On The Sea (Bruce Philips) — I'm Thinking Tonight Of My Blue Eyes (Traditional) — Satisfied (Mississippi John Hurt) — The Cool Green Shores Of Erin (Patrick Sky) — If You Love Me (Malvina Reynolds) — You've Got To Go To Sleep Alone (Jimmy Gilmore) — Foxy Devil (Joe Dolan) — Erin's Green Shore (Traditional, from the singing of Hedy West) — The Last Letter—Aunt Molly Jackson Defines Folk Songs Once And For All (Aunt Molly) — I Am A Union Woman (Aunt Molly Jackson) — My Dearest Dear (Traditional)
Then Came the Children
- Release Date: 1985 (Re-release 1991 on CD)
- Record label: Green Linnet (2099)
- Live album
- Notes: Rosalie Sorrels with Bruce Carver recorded live at the Vancouver East Cultural Centre on February 26, 1984.
- Songs: — Then came the children—Bride 1945—Girls in our town—Rosie Jane—Mother's day song—Delia Rose—What was the colour—Song for daughters/mama—Rosalie you can't go home again.
Be Careful, There's a Baby in the House
- Release Date: 1991
- Record label: Green Linnet
- Studio album
- Notes: Rosalie Sorrels, vocals and guitar; R. Bruce Carver, electric and acoustic guitar; Johnny Shoes, bass and mandolin; Chanterelles, back-up vocals.
- Songs: — Be Careful, There's A Baby In The House—Baby Rocking Medley—You're Always Welcome At Our House—Mehitabel And Her Kittens—God Bless The Child—Don't Play 'Em Unless You've Got Em' — Aces, Straights Flushes—Lost Children Street—Right To Life—Rim Of The World—1972 — New Hampshire (Fear And Loathing On The Campaign Trail) — L.A. Nights—Two Years Later—Jesse's Corrido—Sing Like The Rain (Last Song For David) — I Cannot Sleep For Thinking Of The Children
Report from Grimes Creek
- Release Date: 1991
- Record label: Green Linnet
- Studio album
- Notes: A portrait of the place where I live, Way Out in Idaho. Mostly pieces written by my mother, Nancy Stringfellow and some by me and mom's favorite songs. Rosalie Sorrels, spoken word, vocals, acoustic guitar; Johnny "Shoes" Pisano, mandolin and bass; Charlie Burry, fiddle; Father Jim Watkinson, piano.
- Songs-Poems-Stories: Report From Grimes Creek Written by Nancy Stringfellow Published by Grimes Creek Publishing—A Clearing In The Forest (Saratoga, Mon Amour) Written by Bruce Phillips Published by On Strike Publishing—Querencia Written by Nancy Stringfellow Published by Grimes Creek Publishing—Old Devil Time Written by Pete Seeger—Social Security Written by Nancy Stringfellow Published by Grimes Creek Publishing—Singing In The Country Traditional—My Grandmother's Gardens Written by Rosalie Sorrels Published by Grimes Creek Publishing—The Bells Of Ireland Written by Rosalie Sorrels Published by Grimes Creek Publishing—Love Stories Written by Rosalie Sorrels and Nancy Stringfellow Published by Grimes Creek Publishing—China Or A Woman's Heart Written by Kate Wolf Published by Another Sundown Publishing—Then You'll Remember Me Written by Rosalie Sorrels Published by Grimes Creek Publishing (Song Fragment: "Then You'll Remember Me" from The Bohemian Girl by Balfe)
What Does It Mean to Love?
- Release Date: 1994
- Record label: Green Linnet
- Studio album
- Notes: Rosalie Sorrels, vocals, guitar; in part with instrumental acc. Recorded at Horizon Recording, Boise, Idaho. Folk songs, stories, poems, and monologues of Sorrels' reminiscences of her family and childhood in Utah.
- Songs and stories: There was an old woman / trad. (2:04) — When much in the woods as child / Emily Dickinson (:29) — Place to be / Malvina Reynolds (:47) — I have watched and respected the solitude of a child / Collette (2:35) — Turn around / Malvina Reynolds (2:11) — And I have turned around so many times / R. Sorrels (2:51) — Hi-fi stereo color TV / John Cohen, Jay Ungar (2:05) — Green-eyed dragon / from my family (3:34) — The adventures of Isabelle / Ogden Nash (1:45) — Waltzing with bears / Dale Marxson, Dr. Seuss, Eugene Poddany; The neat thing about my father was— / R. Sorrels (8:49) —Monologue / R. Sorrels (:38) — What does it mean to love? / Antoine de Saint-Exupéry (1:21) — The broken token / from The singing street (1:19) — Love is a silly thing / trad. (2:15) — Well, I certainly am a country girl / R. Sorrels (4:54) — Apples and pears / R. Sorrels (3:05) — The cat that walked by himself / Rudyard Kipling (26:08).
Borderline Heart
- Release Date: 1995
- Record label: Green Linnet
- Studio album
- Notes: Musicians Bruce Barthol; Scott Breadman; Nina Gerber; Mitch Greenhill; Barbara Higbie; Laurie Lewis; Brent Rampone; Rosalie Sorrels; Mayne Smith and Dan Warrick./ Recorded December 1994, at Bay Records in Berkeley, California; additional recording January 1995 at AGE Studio in New York City; additional recording January 1995 at Danny McKinney Recording in Glendale, California.
- Songs: Going Away Party/Looking For Lew—Hitchhiker In The Rain—If I Could Be The Rain—Borderline Heart—Come And Be My Driver—Snowing On Ratone—Tucson One More Time—La Bruja: Flower Of Revolution—Ragweed Ruth—Gospel Snake—Lonesome Georgia Brown—Nevada Moon—Sweet Loving Friendship—My Last Go Round
No Closing Chord: The Songs of Malvina Reynolds
- Release Date: 2000
- Record label: Red House Records
- Studio album, Tribute album
- Notes: A tribute to Malvina Reynolds. Thirteen of Reynolds's most loved songs with vocalist Rosalie Sorrels. Guitarist Nina Gerber, Bonnie Raitt (Slide Guitar), Barbara Higbie (Fiddle, Piano, Accordion, Background Vocals), Laurie Lewis (Hardingfele), Terry Garthwaite (vocals), and Will Scarlett (harmonica.)
- Songs: Magic Penny/Visitation / Sorrels, Rosalie—A Little Muscle—What Have They Done to the Rain? — The Money Crop—The Judge Said—No Hole in My Head—From Way Up Here—Lost Children Street—Rosie Jane—I Cannot Sleep—On the Rim of the World—This World—No Closing Chord
Learned by Livin' Sung by Heart
- Release Date: 2003
- Record label: Way Out In Idaho Productions
- Retrospective or Compilation album
- Notes: A collection of Rosalie's favorite cuts from albums that go all the way back to 1967 and all the way up to 1995. The index includes the original recording information of the cuts. Rosalie Sorrels, vocals and guitar; with various accompanying musicians.
- Songs: Bells Of Ireland (R. Sorrels – Ascap / Report From Grimes Creek / Green Linnet Records, 1991) — Turn Around (Malvina Reynolds / Clara Music / What Does It Mean To Love? / Green Linnet, 1994) — Apple Of My Eye (R. Sorrels – Ascap—Always A Lady — Philo Records – 1978) — Just One More Cowboy (Al Jacobs / Ascap / Moments Of Happiness / Philo Records, 1978) — Nevada Moon (R. Sorrels / Ascap / Borderline Heart / Green Linnet Records, 1995) — Borderline Heart (R. Sorrels – Ascap / Borderline Heart / Green Linnet Records, 1995) — Going Away (B. Phillips / Ascap / Traveling Lady Rides Again / Philo Record, 1978—I Like It – (Mayne Smith / Bmi / Traveling Lady Rides Again / Philo Records, 1978) — Baby Rocking Medley (R. Sorrels / Ascap / Always A Lady / Philo Records, 1976) — Delia Rose (R. Sorrels / Ascap / Then Came The Children / Aural Tradition, Vancouver Bc, 1986) — Sing Like The Rain (R. Sorrels / Ascap / Be Careful, There's A Baby In The House / Aural Tradition, 1991) — Falling In Love Again (Lerner And Hollander / Famous Music / Moments Of Happiness / Philo Records, 1977) — Up Is A Nice Place To Be (R. Sorrels / Ascap / If I Could Be The Rain, 1967 — Currently Available From Folk Legacy Records — Po Box 1148 — Sharon, Ct 06069) — Rosalie, You Can't Go Home Again (R. Sorrels / Ascap / Then Came The Children / Aural Tradition, Vancouver, Bc; 1986) — If You Love Me (Malvina Reynolds / Schroeder Music / Miscellaneous Abstract Record No. 1 / Green Linnet, 1982)
My Last Go Round
- Release Date: 2004
- Record label: Red House Records
- Studio album
- Notes: Rosalie Sorrels, vocals and acoustic guitar; additional musicians include Peggy Seeger, Tony Markellis, Christine Lavin, Patrick Sky, Loudon Wainwright III, Jean Ritchie, Teresina Huxtable, Roma Baran, Peter 'Madcat' Ruth, Vivian Stoll and Mitch Greenhill. Recorded March 23, 2002 in Cambridge, Mass.
- Songs: My last go round—The telling takes me home—I met Rosalie—Pretty Saro—My grandmother told me stories—There was an old woman—Traveling lady—To the dear memory of our friend Dave van Ronk—Aishling Gael—We had some high old times—I think of you—Love will linger on—Rock salt and nails—Be careful, there's a baby in the house—The place you snuck into—Randinelli's castle—Well, now that Rosalie's retired—Wind chimes—My home ain't in The Hall of Fame—Poem—Old devil time

== Albums—Multiple vocal artists featuring Sorrels ==
Album information
The Unfortunate Rake
- Release Date: 1960, 1990
- Record label: Folkways Records — FW03805
- Compilation album, thematic
- Notes: 20 different versional and variational forms of the 'Rake' cycle of ballads. Insert; edited by Kenneth S. Goldstein. Originally issued as analog disc on Folkways Records: FS 3805, 1960; released on Compact disc in 1990. Program notes by the compiler, including texts of the songs (8 p.) inserted in outer container. Performed by various folk singers.
- Songs: The Unfortunate Rake (A. L. Lloyd and Alf Edwards) — The Trooper Cut Down in His Prime – (Ewan MacColl and Peggy Seeger) — The Young Sailor Cut Down in His Prime (Harry Cox) — Noo I'm a Young Man Cut Down in My Prime (Willie Mathieson) — The Bad Girl's Lament (Wade Hemsworth) — One Morning in May (Hally Wood) — Bright Summer Morning (Viola Penn) — The Girl in the Dilger Case (D. K. Wilgus) — The Cowboy's Lament (Bruce Buckley) — Streets of Laredo (Harry Jackson) — St. James Hospital (Alan Lomax) — Gambler's Blues (Dave Van Ronk) — I Once Was a Carman — I Once Was a Carman in the Big Mountain Con (Guthrie T. "Gus" Meade) — The Lineman's Hymn (Rosalie Sorrels) — The Wild Lumberjack (Kenneth S. Goldstein) — A Sun Valley Song (Jan Brunvand and Ellen Stekert) — The Ballad of Bloody Thursday (John Greenway) — Streets of Hamtramck (Bill Friedland, Mark Newman, and Morris Howarth) — The Ballad of Sherman Wu (Pete Seeger) — The Professor's Lament (Roger Abrahams)
The Cotton-pickin' Lift Tower and Other Skiing Songs
- Release Date: 196?
- Record label: Prestige Records (13039)
- Notes: Skiing songs; Ray Conrad, vocals & guitar; with vocal acc. by Rosalie Sorrels. Lyrics (4 p.) inserted; program notes by Ray Conrad
- Songs: Round-Bottomed Bogners—The Cotton-Pickin' Lift Tower — Skiing Billy (with Rosalie Sorrels) — In the Mountains Near Alta—Two Cubes with a Slug of V. O. — The Ski Instructor—The Mineshaft Song—The Last Ride — Skier's Bible School (with Rosalie Sorrels) — Stretch Pants Lament—An Ounce of Prevention—The Skier's Daydream
Welcome to Caffe Lena
- Release Date: 1972
- Record label: Biograph Records
- Live album; various artists
- Notes: Durations and program notes by M. Cooney and B. Spence on the container. Folk songs and instrumentals; various performers. "Recorded live at Caffè Lena, Phila St., Saratoga, N.Y. by The Bottom Forty Recording Company."
- Songs: Lena, won't you open your door (Michael Cooney) — Cluck old hen (Bill Vanaver) — Elegant hobo (Paul Geremia) — Belles of Cheyenne/The blackbird (Bob and Evelyne Beers) — The blacksmith (Lou Killen) — The clog hornpipe/Harvest home (High Level Ranters) — Come on friend (Rosalie Sorrels) — Giovani Montini, the Pope (Patrick Sky) — Blue birds singing (Bottle Hill) — Whore's lament (Hedy West) — Daddy what's a train? (Bruce Phillips) — Sweet little cafe in a square (Lena Spencer) — Tarry not (Frank Wakefield)
Live at the Great American Music Hall
- Release Date: 1980 (Re-released 1993)
- Record label: Flying Fish Records (FF 70238)
- Live album
- Notes: Terry Garthwaite, vocals, guitar; Bobbie Louise Hawkins, monologues; Rosalie Sorrels, vocals, guitar. Recorded live at the Great American Music Hall, San Francisco, 1980.
- Songs: — True love (Garthwaite) —- Take love, for instance (Hawkins) -— The pine (Sorrels) -— Liver piece (Hawkins) —— Hoy hoy hoy (Garthwaite) —- Hot-buttered rum (Sorrels) -— I owe you one (Hawkins) —- Snake toast (Sorrels) -— Catch it while you can (Sorrels) —- You don't know (Garthwaite) -— I remember loving you (Sorrels) -— Magic piece (Hawkins) -— Slender thread (Garthwaite)
Cowboy Songs on Folkways
- Release Date: 1991
- Record label: Smithsonian Folkways Recordings CD SF 40043
- Compilation album; various artists; Traditional cowboy songs
- Notes: Previously released material, now on compact disc. Notes on the singers and the songs, with bibliography (1 folded sheet) enclosed. Recorded 1944–1965.
- Songs: Morning grub holler / Harry Jackson—Round-up cook / Harry Jackson—Chisholm trail / Tex-I-An Boys—Whoopie-ti-yi-yo, get along little dogies / Woody Guthrie & Cisco Houston—Little Joe, the wrangler / Cisco Houston—Little Joe the wrangler's sister Nell / Harry Jackson—Utah Carl / Harry K. McClintock—Put your little foot / Tex-I-An Boys—Trail to Mexico / Peter LaFarge—Las Chapparreras / Peter Hurd—Buffalo skinners / Woody Guthrie—Zebra Dun / Ray Reed—Some cowboy brag talk / Harry Jackson—Horse wrangler / Roger Welsch—Strawberry roan / Harry Jackson.; Texian boys / John A. Lomax, Jr. — Cow cow yicky yicky yea / Leadbelly—Jesse James (Leadbelly's version) / Woody Guthrie—Home on the range/ Pete Seeger — (There's an) Empty cot in the bunkhouse tonight / Rosalie Sorrels — (When it's) Springtime in the Rockies / Leadbelly—Lone star trail / Dave Fredickson—Rodeo hand / Peter LaFarge—Philadelphia lawyer / Woody Guthrie & Cisco Houston—The dying cowboy / Cisco Houston—The devil made Texas / Hermes Nye.
Long Memory
- Release Date: 1996 Original recording for 1992 cold-drill Magazine Boise State University.
- Record label: Red House Records
- Studio albums; Traditional and new songs
- Notes: A collection of old and new union songs by Rosalie Sorrels, Utah Phillips, and Pete Seeger recorded at Horizon Sound Studio, Meridian, Idaho. Performed by Rosalie Sorrels, and Utah Phillips, vocals, guitar.
- Songs: Aunt Molly Jackson defines folk songs once and for—I am a union woman—Aragon Mill—Carolina cotton mill—De colores—Bury me in my overalls—Soapbox oration—All used up—Two bums—Dump the bosses off your back—The charge on Mother Jones — Harry Orchard—Nevada Jane—No more Reds — Wobbly doxology
Friends of Mine
- Release Date: 1998
- Record label: HighTone Records (HCD 8089)
- Studio album; Ramblin' Jack Elliott with various artists
- Notes: Folk and country songs; Ramblin' Jack Elliott, guitar and vocals; with vocal and instrumental accompaniment. Recorded Feb. 1996–Oct. 1997.
- Songs: Riding Down the Canyon (with Arlo Guthrie) – Me and Billy the Kid (with Peter Rowan) — Last letter (with Rosalie Sorrels) — Louise (with Tom Waits) — Rex's Blues (with Emmylou Harris & Nanci Griffith) — Walls of Red Wing (with John Prine) – Hard Travelin' (with Jerry Jeff Walker) — He Was a Friend of Mine (with Jerry Jeff Walker) — Dark as a Dungeon (with Guy Clark) — Friend of the Devil (with Bob Weis) — Reason to Believe—Bleecker Street Blues.
Treasures Left Behind: Remembering Kate Wolf
- Release Date: 1998
- Record label: Red House Records RHR CD 114
- Tribute album; studio album; various artists
- Notes: Folk and popular songs; words and music by Kate Wolf; songs performed by various artists. Booklet contains tributes and remembrances about Kate Wolf.
- Songs: Give yourself to love (Kathy Mattea) — These times we're living in (Dave Alvin) — Friend of mine (Nanci Griffith) — Sweet love (John Gorka) — Here in California (Lucinda Williams) — Like a river (Peter Rowan & The Rowan Brothers) — Carolina pines (Cris Williamson & Tret Fure) — See here, she said (U. Utah Phillips) – In china or a woman's heart (Rosalie Sorrels) — Tequila and me (Greg Brown & Ferron) — Back roads (Nina Gerber) — Cornflower blue (Eric Bogle) — Love still remains (Emmylou Harris) — Thinking about you (Terry Garthwaite).
An Imaginary Christmas in Idaho
- Release Date: 1999
- Record label: Limberlost Books & Records (Boise ID)
- Live album; various artists
- Notes: Christmas songs, poetry and folk tales in English and Basque performed by Rosalie Sorrels, Gino Sky and friends featuring the More's Creek String Band, Wild Roses and Biotzetik Basque Choir. Recorded June 7, 1999 at the Basque Museum and Cultural Center in Boise, Idaho.
- Songs: Jigs: Tobin's favorite jig, Swallowtail jig—An imaginary Christmas in Idaho—Bread and fishes—Winter song—Grandma—Haurrak ikasazue—The fruitcake—Miz Fogarty's Christmas cake—Jingle bells/We wish you a merry Christmas—Party crasher's carol—Interview with John Thomsen—Just a little lefse—Christmas in their eyes—Hot buttered rum—Christmas Eve – Bufana and Lena—Italian Christmas carol—Intro to Biotzetik – Alabatua—Haurrak ikasazue reprise.
No Closing Chord: The Songs of Malvina Reynolds
- Release Date: 2000
- Record label: Red House Records
- Studio album, Tribute album
- Notes: A tribute to Malvina Reynolds. Thirteen of Reynolds's most loved songs with vocalist Rosalie Sorrels. Guitarist Nina Gerber, Bonnie Raitt (Slide Guitar), Barbara Higbie (Fiddle, Piano, Accordion, Background Vocals), Laurie Lewis (Hardingfele), Terry Garthwaite (vocals), and Will Scarlett (harmonica.)
- Songs: Magic Penny/Visitation / Sorrels, Rosalie—A Little Muscle—What Have They Done to the Rain? — The Money Crop—The Judge Said—No Hole in My Head—From Way Up Here—Lost Children Street—Rosie Jane—I Cannot Sleep—On the Rim of the World—This World—No Closing Chord
A Nod to Bob: An Artists' Tribute to Bob Dylan on his Sixtieth Birthday
- Release Date: 2001
- Record label: Red House Records RHR CD 154
- Tribute album; studio album; various artists
- Notes: All songs previously released by Bob Dylan Program notes inserted in container. Various performers recorded at the World Theater, St. Paul Minnesota.
- Songs: Love minus zero/no limit /; Eliza Gilkyson; (3:54) —; Sweetheart like you /; Guy Davis; (5:07) —; Clothes line saga /; Suzzy & Maggie Roche; (3:14) —; Delia /; Spider John Koerner & Dave Ray; (2:42) —; I want you /; Cliff Eberhardt; (5:15) —; All along the watchtower /; Tom Landa & the Paperboys; (4:20) —; Dieu à nos côte's; (With God on our side) /; Hart-Rouge; (4:06) —; Boots of Spanish leather /; Martin Simpson; (6:20) —; Restless farewell /; Norman Blake & Peter Ostroushko; (5:33) —; "It Ain't Me, Babe" /; Lucy Kaplansky /; (4:20) —; Pledging my time /; Greg Brown; (3:40) — -; Tomorrow is a Long Time /; Rosalie Sorrels; (4:53) —; Intro to Don't think twice, it's all right /; Ramblin' Jack Elliott; (1:48) —; Don't think twice, it's all right /; Ramblin' Jack Elliott; (4:07).
Classic Railroad Songs from Smithsonian Folkways
- Release Date: 2006
- Record label: Smithsonian Folkways Recordings SFW CD 40192
- Compilation album; various artists
- Notes: Selections originally released 1952–1997; track 11 previously unissued. Program notes, including bibliography and discography (33 p. : ill.) inserted in container Recorded 1942–1981.
- Songs: An excerpt from "Rail dynamics"; (recorded by Emory Cook); (:24) —; Train 45; (the New Lost City Ramblers); (2:18) —; Kassie Jones; (Furry Lewis); (2:56) —; Jay Gould's daughter; (Pete Seeger); (2:38) —; Railroad Bill; (Walt Robertson); (2:08) —; Linin' track; (Lead Belly); (1:15) —; Freight Train; (Elizabeth Cotten); (2:43) —; Drill, ye tarriers, drill; (Cisco Houston); (2:30) —; Zach, the Mormon engineer; (L.M. Hilton); (2:02) —; Lost train blues; (the Virginia Mountain Boys); (2:57) —; The F.F.V.; (Annie Watson); (3:52) —; He's coming to us dead; (the New Lost City Ramblers); (3:15) —; The train that carried my girl from town; (Doc Watson); (2:18) —; Rock Island Line; (Lead Belly); (2:03) —; Lonesome train; (Sonny Terry, Woody Guthrie, and Cisco Houston); (3:31) —; John Henry; (Woody Guthrie and Cisco Houston); (2:42) —; The wreck of the Number Nine; (Rosalie Sorrels); (1:36) —; Freight train blues; (Brownie McGhee); (3:36) —; The New Market wreck; (Mike Seeger); (3:39) —; Jerry, go oil that car; (Haywire Mac); (2:38) —; Way out in Idaho; (Rosalie Sorrels); (3:34) —; Old John Henry died on the mountain; (Henry Grady Terrell); (1:55) —; Casey Jones; (John D. Mounce); (:20) —; Wreck of the Old 97; (Pop Stoneman); (2:51) —; Midnight special; (Lead Belly); (2:03) —; Wabash Cannonball; (Doc Watson); (3:17) —; Lost train blues; (Vernon Sutphin); (1:13) —; New River train; (Iron Mountain String Band); (4:26) —; Excerpt from "Three little engines and 33 cars"; (recorded by Vinton Wight); (:25).
Bear's Sonic Journals: Sing Out!
- Release Date: 2024
- Record label: Owsley Stanley Foundation
- Live album; various artists
- Notes: Live concert performances recorded on April 25, 1981. Sorrels is accompanied by Mitch Greenhill on guitar.
- Songs: "The Loving of the Game" (Pat Garvey, Victoria Garvey) — "If You Love Me" (Malvina Reynolds) — "12 Adler Place" (Rosalie Sorrels) — "Postcard from India" (Rosalie Sorrels) — "You’ve Got to Go to Sleep Alone" (Jimmie Dale Gilmore) — "Scared to Be Alone" (Dory Previn) — "I Remember Loving You" (Utah Phillips)
