= World Folk Music Association =

The World Folk Music Association is a non-profit organization formed in 1983 by folk singer/songwriter Tom Paxton and Dick Cerri, a radio host from Washington D. C. The first chairman of the board was Paxton and Cerri served as president.

Paxton and Cerri declared that the WFMA was "dedicated to promoting contemporary and traditional folk music, spreading the word to fans, and keeping the folk community informed and involved".

WFMA presents a monthly showcase in Bethesda, Maryland, and from 1984 to 2011 hosted an annual benefit concert. The WFMA presented its Lifetime Achievement Award, Kate Wolf Award, and John Denver award at its annual concert through 2006. The Washington Post described the 6th annual concert as "nostalgic and topical, competent and compelling".

To celebrate Woody Guthrie's 82d birthday, WFMA presented a Woody Guthrie Tribute Concert in 1994. A two-night concert in tribute of The Kingston Trio's 45th anniversary was held by WFMA in 2002. In 2013, WFMA hosted a benefit concert to support the Madison House Autism Foundation. WFMA also sponsored the final Chad Mitchell Trio concert in 2014.

== WFMA Lifetime Achievement Award ==
The first recipient of the WFMA Lifetime Achievement Award was Odetta in 1994. Other winners include:

- Lou Gottlieb of the Limeliters, 1995
- Oscar Brand, 1996
- Bob Gibson, 1997 (posthumous award)
- John Denver, 1998 (posthumous award)
- Tommy Makem, 1999
- Rod Kennedy, 2000
- John Stewart, 2001
- Joe Glazer, 2002
- Carolyn Hester, 2003
- Dave Van Ronk, 2004 (posthumous award)
- Dick Cerri, 2005
- Tom Paxton, 2006

== Kate Wolf Memorial Award ==
Established in 1987 to honor the memory of Kate Wolf, a singer/songwriter who died from leukemia, the Kate Wolf Memorial Award is presented "to the performer who best epitomizes the music and spirit of Kate Wolf." It has been awarded to:

- Utah Phillips, 1988
- Christine Lavin of Four Bitchin' Babes, 1989
- Rosalie Sorrels, 1990
- Robin Batteau, 1991
- Hugh Romney, also known as Wavy Gravy, 1992
- Peter Yarrow of Peter, Paul, and Mary, 1993
- Crow Johnson, 1994
- Nanci Griffith, 1995
- Jack Hardy, 1996
- Tom Chapin, 1997
- David Buskin, 1998
- Nina Gerber, 1999
- Noel Paul Stookey of Peter, Paul, and Mary, 2000
- The Kennedys, 2001
- Anne Hills, 2002
- David Massengill, 2003
- Tom Rowe of Schooner Fare, 2004 (posthumous award)
- The Shaw Brothers, 2005

== John Denver Award ==
Established in 1998, the John Denver Award was awarded in 1999 to Denver's original publisher and producer, Milt Okun. Other recipients include:

- Kenn Roberts, 2000
- Bill Danoff, 2001
- Tom Wisner, 2003
- Greg Artzner and Terry Leonino (Magpie), 2004
- Dawn Publications, 2006
