= Sanity and Grace =

Live album by Judy Collins
- Released: February 1989
- Recorded: 10 June 1988
- Venue: Tarrytown, New York
- Genre: Pop; pop rock
- Length: 42:54
- Label: Gold Castle
- Producer: Judy Collins; Linda Goldstein; Louis Nelson

Judy Collins chronology
Trust Your Heart (1987)	Sanity and Grace (1989)	Fires of Eden (1990)

Professional ratings
Review scores
Source	Rating
AllMusic	unrated
The Encyclopedia of Popular Music	2/5 stars
The Rolling Stone Album Guide	2.5/5 stars

Sanity and Grace is the third live album by American singer Judy Collins, released in February 1989 by Gold Castle Records.

== Overview ==
The album was recorded live on 10 June 1988 in Tarrytown, New York. Like its predecessors, the album is unique in that it features previously unsung songs by Collins. It is also her first full-length album since 1985. The album features four Collins original songs, as well as several cover versions, including "From a Distance" and "Wind Beneath My Wings", which would go on to become big hits for Bette Midler.

== Track listing ==
No.	Title	Writer(s)	Length
1.	"History"	David Lasley; Marsha Malamet; Allan Rich	3:46
2.	"Wind Beneath My Wings"	Larry Henley; Jeff Silbar	4:45
3.	"Lovin' and Leavin'"	Judy Collins	3:49
4.	"From a Distance"	Julie Gold	4:14
5.	"Sanity and Grace"	Collins	5:04
6.	"Daughters of Time"	Collins	4:06
7.	"Cats in the Cradle"	Harry Chapin	3:49
8.	"Pretty Polly"	Traditional	8:40
9.	"Born to the Breed"	Collins	4:43
Total length:			42:54
