= Mormon folk music =

Music genre

Mormon folk music is primarily composed of folk music which was sung by Mormon pioneers in present-day Utah from the mid-19th century through the early 20th century. A notable historical component of Utah music, the popularity of Mormon folk music declined along with traditional music nationally after the advent of music recording. However, the popularity of uniquely Mormon folk music had already begun its decline before the end of the 19th century. Mormon folk songs generally showcase pioneer-era Mormon unity and communal values.

== History of Mormon folk music ==
In 1847 Brigham Young led the first company of Mormon pioneers into what became Salt Lake City, Utah, and the Great Basin area became steadily populated by Latter-day Saints. The traditional folk ballad played an important role in the lives of Mormon pioneers and early settlers. Songs detail the life of saints from the organization of the church in New York in 1830, through life in Kirtland and Nauvoo, to the trip across the plains and life in the Salt Lake Valley. Additionally, cultural and religious themes unique to the LDS Church in some songs made Mormon folk music distinct from larger folk music in the United States, and many songs herald church leaders and promote obedience to the church's teachings.

Songs typically had simple tunes, easy-to-recall lyrics, and broad enough appeal to be sung by contemporary Mormons. Mormon folk music mainly consisted of adaptations of popular songs, as well as of traditional folk songs from the United States and Europe. Given that many early Mormon converts came from different countries and spoke different languages, music became a way of sharing and preserving one's cultural heritage, as well as a means of communication with others. Historical Latter-day Saint attitudes and beliefs can generally be inferred from the types and lyrics of songs they sang.

During the first generation of pioneers, instruments were limited to violins, banjos, and guitars, and so many songs would have been sung with accompaniment from these instruments or were sung a capella. The first piano was brought to Utah in 1851, and piano arrangements of many popular folk songs were written.

== Themes of songs ==
Some songs recounted the difficult trip across the plains to Utah. Like many other overland pioneers, most Mormons came west by ox or horse-driven carts, and some songs were shared between Mormon and non-Mormon pioneers. The journey was difficult and often perilous, and tragedies occurred such as that of the Martin and Willie handcart companies. Handcart pioneers often sung songs on their strenuous trip to Utah in order to keep their spirits up, and such music played a large role in pioneer community life. Many of the songs that became popular during the journey to Utah reflect the belief held by the pioneers that they were the Lord's chosen people, and that this calling came with a responsibility to act accordingly

The songs sung by Mormon pioneers were similar to folk songs sung elsewhere. Folk music at the time typically had themes of love, courtship, and crime, along with the courage, lighthearted nature, and hopefulness of the pioneers. Also conveyed in the music is the pioneers' love for their newfound mountain home, which allowed them to build a community safe from persecution. Members of the LDS Church today still sing a modified version of the "Handcart Song, set to the tune "The King of the Cannibal Islands."

"Handcart Song" (chorus)
And some will push and some will pull
As we go marching up the hill,
So merrily on our way we go
Until we reach the valley-o!

The hardships of the pioneers continued upon their arrival in the West, and their first few years in the Great Basin were marked by crop failure, economic hardships, health challenges, fear and animosity towards the federal government, and the push for statehood. Many folk songs from this time reflect the continued struggle of the pioneers in Utah. Other songs convey church teachings and values, such as prayer, familial love, Christian faith and brotherhood, the preaching of the gospel to others, revelation from God, and the joy of worship.

Other Mormon folk songs recount historical events such as Utah's Black Hawk War, the construction of the first transcontinental railroad, the Mormon Battalion, the miracle of the gulls, and even imprisonment for polygamy, which was fairly common for polygamist Mormons in the 1880s. These songs were sung both for entertainment and for relaying a shared cultural experience. Songs were also used as a means of storytelling and historical preservation, and many Mormon folk songs provide a surprisingly accurate account of historical events.

A few songs expressed the animosity of Mormons toward the United States federal government. Utah had been denied statehood until 1896 on the basis of the political unity found amongst the people of the territory and of the continued practice of polygamy. Many Utah residents at the time harbored negative feelings towards "Uncle Sam," a sentiment is especially evident in songs from around 1857 contemporary to the Utah War. An example is the "Doo Dah Mormon Song, set to the recognizable tune of Stephen Foster's "Camptown Races".

"Doo Dah Mormon Song" (chorus)
Then let us be on hand
By Brigham Young to stand,
And if our enemies do appear,
We'll sweep them from the land.

== Decline of Mormon folk music ==
Traditional songs in Utah were superseded by recorded and broadcast music early in the 20th century, following the trend of traditional music nationwide. However, the popularity of distinctively Mormon folk songs had already faded by this point. After Utah became a state in 1896 many Mormon folk songs—especially those expressing fear and animosity about the federal government—ceased to be prominent.

Latter-day Saints today still sing a handful of folk songs, such as the "Handcart Song". Often this is done in remembrance of Pioneer Day, the anniversary of the first Mormon pioneers' arrival in Utah, and such songs serve as a tie to the past. In 1982, Brigham Young University established the Folk Music Ensemble, which was still performing as of 2021.

== Recordings and artists ==
During the folk boom of the 1950s-70s, a number of artists made recordings of Mormon folk songs. Perhaps the best known of these was Rosalie Sorrels, who devoted an entire LP to the subject. The Tabernacle Choir at Temple Square has also performed various Mormon folk songs, including a 2009 album of "American folk hymns and spirituals." Several Utah-based folk groups, including the Three D's, the Deseret String Band, the Beehive Band, and Otter Creek have performed traditional Mormon folk songs as part of their repertoire.

Examples

- Come Thou Fount of Every Blessing: American Folk Hymns & Spirituals (The Tabernacle Choir at Temple Square), Intellectual Reserve
- Folk Songs of Idaho and Utah (sung by Rosalie Sorrels), Folkways Records FH 5343
- The Iron Horse (Mormon folk ballads sung by the 3-D's)
- Hymns, Songs and Fiddle Tunes of the Utah Pioneers (two-CD album by the Deseret String Band)
- Mormon Folk Songs (sung by L.M. Hilton), Folkways Records FW02036

== See also ==
- Mormon folklore: Folk songs
