= Julie Gold =

American singer-songwriter (born 1956)

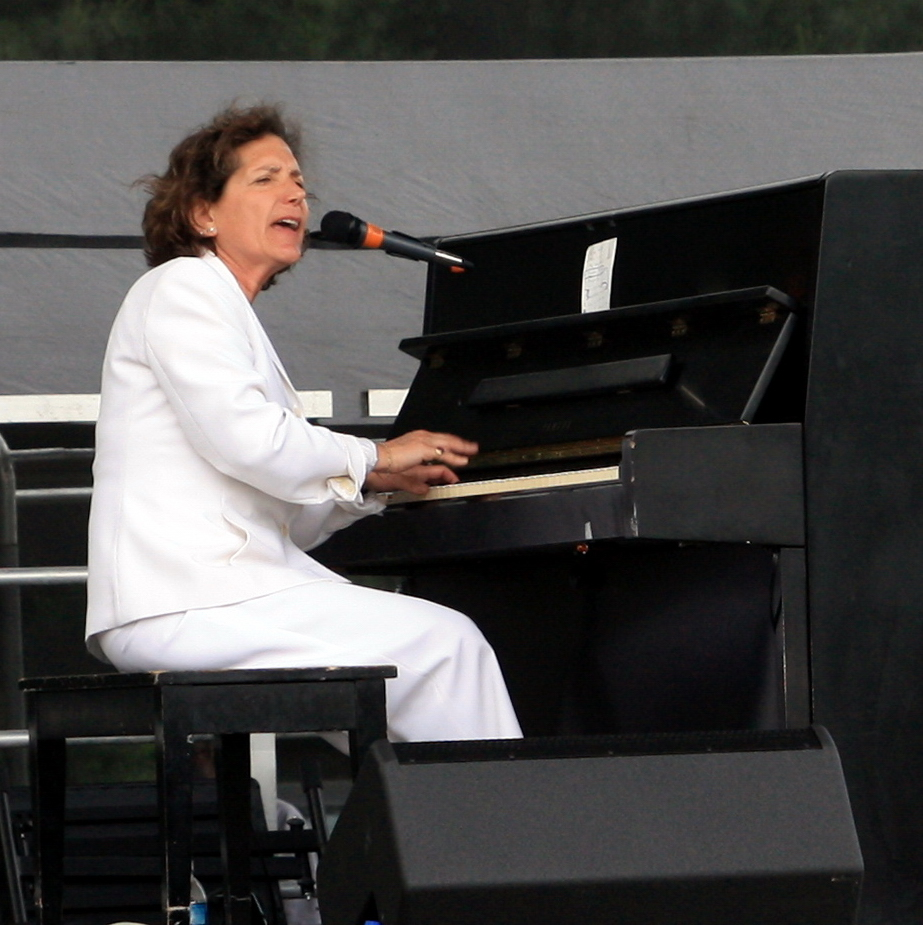
- Julie Gold performs at the M'korstock event at Congregation M'Kor Shalom synagogue in Cherry Hill, New Jersey in May 2009

Background information
- Born: February 3, 1956 (age 70); Havertown, Pennsylvania
- Occupations: Singer, songwriter
- Instruments: Vocals, piano
- Years active: 1978–present
- Website: juliegold.com

Julie Gold (born February 3, 1956) is an American singer-songwriter. She is best known for her musical composition "From a Distance," which became a hit for Bette Midler and won a Grammy Award for Song of the Year in 1991.

== Biography ==
Gold was born in Havertown, Pennsylvania and later moved to Philadelphia, Pennsylvania. She graduated from the Philadelphia High School for Girls in 1974 and from Temple University in 1978. She appeared as a featured performer in many Philadelphia area coffee houses and entertainment venues, including the Main Point and Bijou Cafe. From 1990 to 1994, she was a member of Four Bitchin' Babes, with Christine Lavin, Megon McDonough and Sally Fingerett.

Gold's maternal grandparents and mother were Jewish immigrants from Russia in the 1930s. Her paternal Jewish grandparents came from Romania. Her Orthodox Jewish mother and Conservative father were a founding couple in Philadelphia's Reform Temple Beth Elohim. Her Jewish background has influenced her songs.

"From a Distance" has millions of airplays. It has been recited into the Congressional Record by Senator Barbara Boxer, recorded internationally and translated into many languages. It has been illustrated as a children's book and machined into music boxes. It has been quoted in books, calendars, greeting cards and the wake-up call for the astronauts in the Mir space station the first time Americans worked with Russians in space. A wide range of recording artists have covered it, including Jewel, Elaine Paige, Cliff Richard, the African Children's Choir, Judy Collins, the Byrds, Fairport Convention, Kathy Mattea and Donna Summer.

Nanci Griffith, the first to record "From a Distance", also recorded Gold's songs "Heaven", "Southbound Train", "Good Night New York" and "Mountain of Sorrow". Other artists who performed Gold's songs include Patti LaBelle, Patti LuPone, Lea Salonga, and Andrea Marcovicci. Her song "Thanks to You" was featured in the 1993 film Andre, and "Dream Loud" was featured in the 2002 film Unfaithful.

Gold wrote the lyrics to the 1992 image campaign song commissioned by WNBC entitled "We're 4 New York", alongside Edd Kalehoff, who also penned the jingle and the news theme.
