= Edward Little High School =

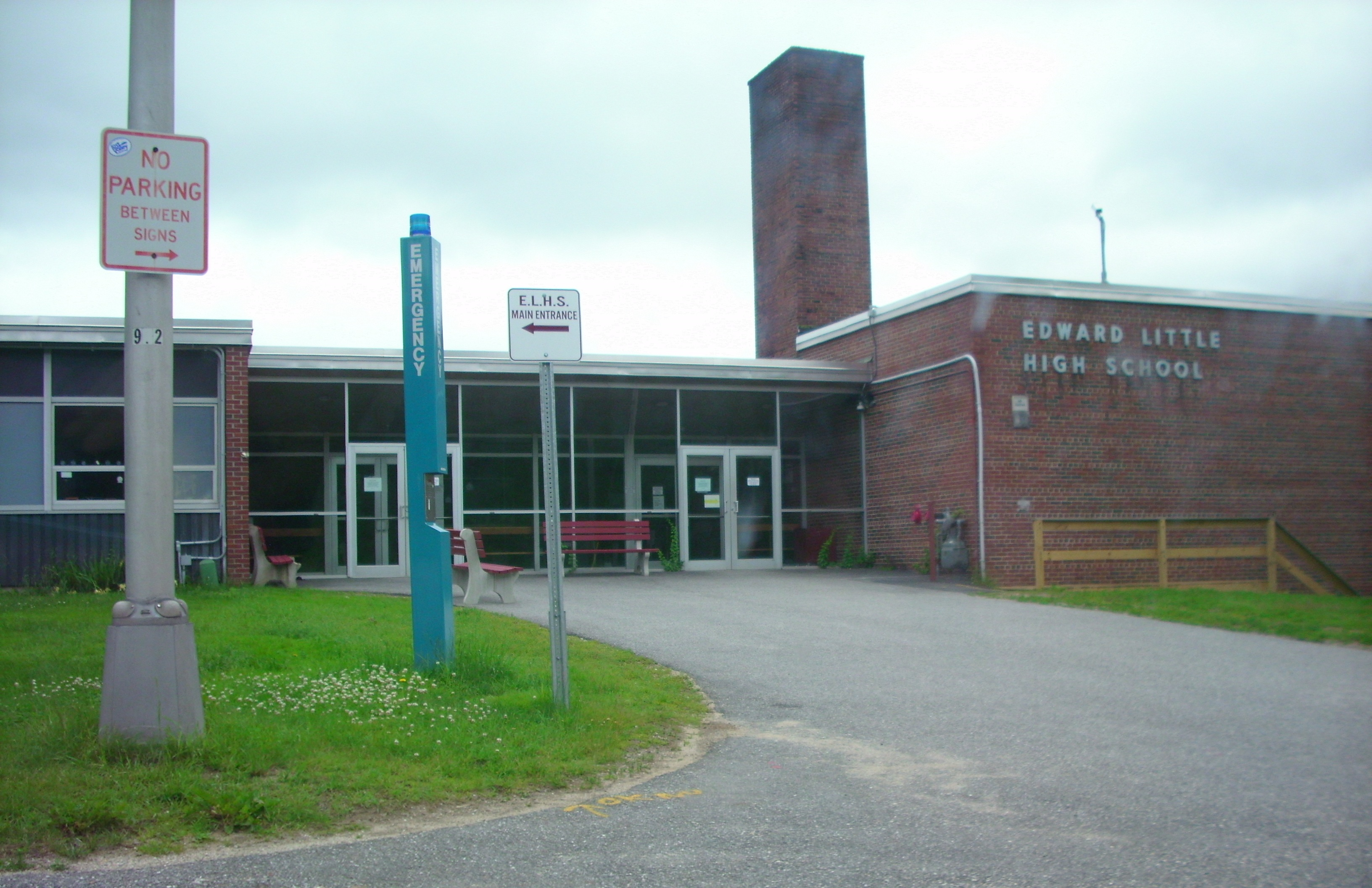
- The entrance of the former building, demolished in 2023

Location
- 77 Harris St. Auburn, Androscoggin Country, Maine 04210; United States; 44°5′40″N 70°14′5″W

Information
- Established: 1835; 191 years ago as Lewiston Falls Academy
- School district: Auburn School Department
- CEEB code: 200035
- Principal: Valerie Ackley
- Teaching staff: 81.00 (FTE)
- Enrollment: 1,032 (2023-2024)
- Student to teacher ratio: 12.74
- Colors: Maroon and white
- Nickname: Red Eddies
- Rivals: Lewiston High School, Oxford Hills Comprehensive High School
- Yearbook: Oracle
- Website: elhs.auburnschl.edu

Edward Little High School is a public high school in Auburn, Maine, United States. The school was established in 1835 as Lewiston Falls Academy after philanthropist Edward Little donated 9 acres (3.6 ha) and considerable money to the academy, which was named in his honor. The school is now situated on a 56.25-acre (22.76 ha) tract of land overlooking the city from the top of Goff Hill in Auburn Heights.

== History ==
=== 19th century ===
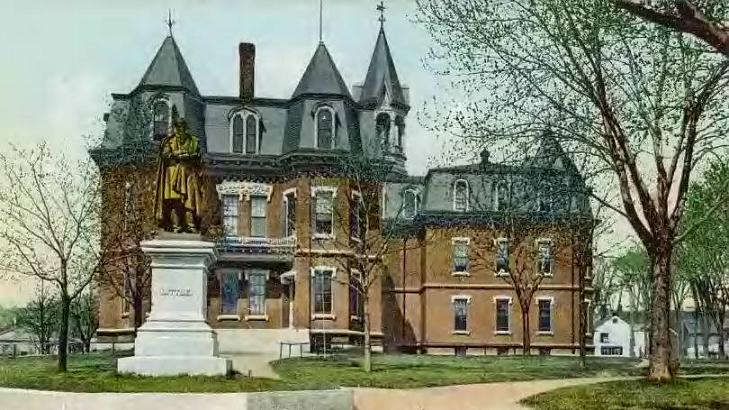
Edward Little High School, c. 1906

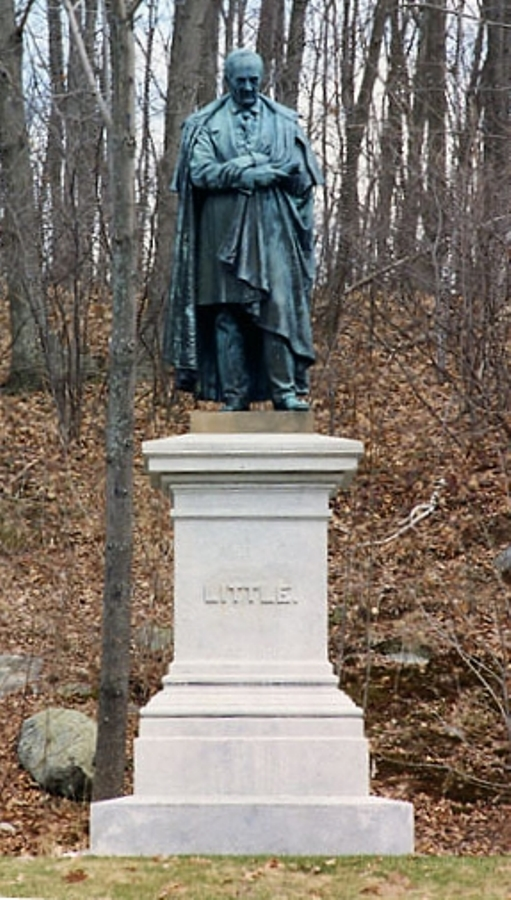
A sculpture of Edward Little at the school by Franklin Simmons

The school was first commissioned by the Maine State Legislature as Lewiston Falls Academy. Little contributed numerous resources to the school, including land and money. It was renamed to the Edward Little Institute in September 1849. When the City of Auburn was given control over the school in April 1874, it came with the condition that the school always be named in honor of Edward Little.

In December 1884, the school was damaged by a fire. Newspaper accounts reported the building that cost $18,000 to build was insured for $6,000. The school suffered another fire this one destroyed the entire third floor in 1943.

=== 20th century ===
In the early 1930s, a second building was erected. In 1961, the building formerly used as Edward Little High School was completed at a cost of US$1.9 million.

=== 21st century ===
In June 2009, the school was placed on probation by the New England Association of Schools and Colleges. Reasons cited for this probation included "the poor and inadequate condition of the school's kitchen facility...the insufficient heating system," and low funding for educational resources and technology.

In 2023, the construction of a replacement building reached completion, opening for the 2023-24 school year. The former building has since been demolished.

== Athletics ==
The school's sports teams are known as the Red Eddies, with the ghost of Edward Little as their mascot. The school competes as a member of the Kennebec Valley Athletic Conference. The school's most successful teams in recent years include Alpine ski racing, soccer, basketball, and track and field. Other sports include soccer, baseball, cheerleading, cross country running, football, lacrosse, swimming, ice and field hockey, and tennis.

== Notable alumni ==
- Charles B. Carter, former football player, lawyer, and politician
- Alonzo Conant, former municipal court judge
- Larry Gowell, former professional baseball pitcher, New York Yankees
- Gina Melaragno, member, Maine House of Representatives
- Bert Roberge, former professional baseball player, Chicago White Sox, Houston Astros, and Montreal Expos
- Luke Robinson, professional wrestler
- Dave Rowe, folk music musician
- Tom Rowe, folk musician
- Billy Silverman, professional wrestling referee
- Charlie Small, former professional baseball player, Boston Red Sox
- Olympia Snowe, former U.S. Senator and U.S. Representative
- Peter Snowe, former member, Maine House of Representatives
- Pamela White, former U.S. ambassador to Gambia and Haiti
- George C. Wing Jr., mayor of Auburn and member, Maine House of Representatives
