= Kate Wolf =

American singer-songwriter (1942–1986)

- Wolf c. 1980

Background information
- Born: Kathryn Louise Allen; January 27, 1942; San Francisco, California, US
- Died: December 10, 1986 (aged 44) San Francisco, California, US
- Genres: Folk, Country folk
- Occupations: Musician; songwriter
- Instruments: Vocalist, acoustic guitar, piano
- Years active: 1976–1986
- Labels: Owl, Kaleidoscope, Rhino
- Website: katewolf.com

Kate Wolf (born Kathryn Louise Allen; January 27, 1942 – December 10, 1986) was an American folk singer and songwriter. Though her career was relatively short, she had a significant impact on the folk music scene. Her best-known compositions include "Here in California", "Love Still Remains", "Across the Great Divide", "Unfinished Life", “Green Eyes” and "Give Yourself to Love". She recorded six albums as a solo artist. She was elected to the NAIRD Independent Music Hall of Fame in 1987. Her songs have since been recorded by Nanci Griffith and Emmylou Harris (whose recording of "Love Still Remains" was nominated for a Grammy Award in 1999).

== Biography ==
Wolf was born in San Francisco to John Fred Allen (1915–1991) and Ernestine Ruth Allen, née Endicott (1918−1996). She began studying piano at 4 but quit at 16 because of her shyness. During their senior year (1959–60) at Berkeley High School, Kathy Allen and her friend Marian Auerbach (now Shapiro) sang folk songs at the Berkeley High School Talent Shows (1957 and 1960). At age 19 she first met Saul Wolf, an architecture student at UC Berkeley; they married two years later. They had two children, born in 1964 and 1967.

In 1969 she became part of the Big Sur music community and developed rapidly as a guitarist and songwriter, influenced by such friends as Gil "Jellyroll" Turner and George Schroder. In 1971, she parted from Saul Wolf on good terms and moved to Sonoma County. There she formed her first band, The Wildwood Flower, with Don Coffin, whom she later married.

Her first album, Back Roads, released in 1976 on her own label, Owl Records, was recorded in a living room with the band Wildwood Flower, and was "remarkably well done." An important mentor, friend and touring companion was Utah Phillips. In 1979, she separated from Don Coffin, and the Wildwood Flower folded, and guitarist and mandolin player Nina Gerber became her accompanist for the rest of her career.

She was married to Terry Fowler from 1982 until her death on December 10, 1986, at age 44, after a long battle with leukemia. She is buried at a small church cemetery in Goodyears Bar, California. In 1987, the World Folk Music Association established the Kate Wolf Award to honor her memory.

== Discography ==
- Back Roads (1976) (billed as Kate Wolf and the Wildwood Flower)
- Lines on the Paper (1977) (billed as Kate Wolf and the Wildwood Flower)
- Safe at Anchor (1979)
- Close to You (1980)
- Give Yourself to Love (1982)
- Poet's Heart (1985)
- Gold in California – A Retrospective of Recordings (1986)
- The Wind Blows Wild (1988)
- An Evening in Austin (1988)
- Looking Back at You (1994)
- Carry It On (1996)
- Weaver of Visions – The Kate Wolf Anthology (2000)
- Live in Mendocino (2018)

A live performance by Kate Wolf in 1981, comprising seven songs on which she is accompanied by Nina Gerber and Ford James, is included in the 2024 album Bear's Sonic Journals: Sing Out!.

Wolf, with her then husband Don Coffin, also appears on the 1973 album We Walked by the Water by folksinger Lionel Kilberg. This album was re-released in 1995 under the title Breezes and credited to Wolf alone on the front cover. Her family has stated that Wolf did not consider these songs as representative of her work.

Both Kilberg's We Walked by the Water and Wolf's own album Lines on the Paper are dedicated to Gil Turner, who Wolf and Coffin first met via Lionel Kilberg. Wolf subsequently recorded her own version of Turner's much-covered folk anthem "Carry It On".

A number of Wolf's albums were done in collaboration with Bill Griffin.

== Legacy ==
=== Music festival ===
Wolf's music was celebrated each year toward the end of June at the Kate Wolf Memorial Music Festival held at Black Oak Ranch in Laytonville, California. Several thousand guests attended this outdoor festival, which was regularly headlined by popular folk musicians such as Nina Gerber and Greg Brown. The festival traditionally closed with Wolf's song "Give Yourself to Love".

The 25th annual Kate Wolf Music Festival was scheduled for June 2020, then postponed due to the COVID-19 pandemic. It took place 2 years later, as a 4-day festival, rescheduled to June 23–26, 2022. According to the promoters, Back Road Productions, 2022 was the final Kate Wolf Music Festival.

=== Tributes and covers ===
- American folk duo Buskin and Batteau wrote "Never Cry Wolf" as a tribute to Wolf.
- Scottish-born Australian singer-songwriter Eric Bogle wrote "Katie and the Dreamtime Land" as a tribute to Wolf.
- Greg Brown wrote and performed "Kate's Guitar", which is on his 2004 album In the Hills of California, recorded live at the Kate Wolf Memorial Music Festival.
- 'Gaelic Americana' singer Kyle Carey covered Wolf's song "Across the Great Divide" which is on her 2014 album North Star.
- "Across the Great Divide" is the first track on Nanci Griffith's 1993 cover album called Other Voices, Other Rooms. She is accompanied by Emmylou Harris.
- Klezmer revival folk musicians Daniel Kahn and Sarah Mina Gordon premiered a Yiddish-language cover of Wolf's "Telluride" at the Yiddish Book Center's YidStock Klezmer Festival in July 2019.
- Songwriter, Joel Koosed, upon hearing on the radio of Wolf's death, wrote "Goodbye, Kate Wolf."
- Treasures Left Behind
  In 1998, a tribute album titled Treasures Left Behind: Remembering Kate Wolf was released by Red House Records. The album contains Wolf songs performed by various artists and the booklet contains tributes and remembrances about her.
  Track listing:
  1. "Give Yourself to Love" (Kathy Mattea)
  2. "These Times We're Living In" (Dave Alvin)
  3. "Friend of Mine" (Nanci Griffith)
  4. "Sweet Love" (John Gorka)
  5. "Here in California" (Lucinda Williams)
  6. "Like a River" (Peter Rowan & The Rowan Brothers)
  7. "Carolina Pines" (Cris Williamson & Tret Fure)
  8. "See Here, She Said" (U. Utah Phillips)
  9. "In China, or a Woman's Heart" (Rosalie Sorrels)
  10. "Tequila and Me" (Greg Brown & Ferron)
  11. "Back Roads" (Nina Gerber)
  12. "Cornflower Blue" (Eric Bogle)
  13. "Love Still Remains" (Emmylou Harris)
  14. "Thinking About You" (Terry Garthwaite)
- In 2002, Will Oldham under the name Bonny Billy and Rainywood (who would later become Brightblack Morning Light) released a Kate Wolf tribute split single. Oldham covered Wolf's "Brother Warrior" while Rainywood covered Wolf's "Cornflower Blue". The single was issued by Oldham's Palace Records through Drag City Records.Bonny Billy / Rainywood - Brother Warrior / Cornflower Blue
