= Bear's Sonic Journals: Sing Out! =

Live album by various artists
- Released: February 23, 2024
- Recorded: April 25, 1981
- Venue: Berkeley Community Theater
- Genre: Acoustic music
- Length: 160:15
- Label: Owsley Stanley Foundation

Bear's Sonic Journals chronology
Bear's Sonic Journals: The Foxhunt (2022)	Bear's Sonic Journals: Sing Out! (2024)	Bear's Sonic Journals: You're Doin' Fine (2024)

Bear's Sonic Journals: Sing Out! is a three-CD live album of acoustic music by various artists. It features performances by Jerry Garcia & Bob Weir, Country Joe McDonald, Kate Wolf, Rosalie Sorrels, and the Rhythm Devils. It was recorded at the Berkeley Community Theater in Berkeley, California on April 25, 1981. The album includes a 50-page booklet of essays and photos. It was released on February 23, 2024.

The "Sing Out" concert was a benefit for the Seva Foundation, organized by Wavy Gravy. It was recorded by audio engineer (and LSD chemist) Owsley "Bear" Stanley. A performance by Odetta at the same show is not included in the album, as the producers were unable to secure the rights to it.

== Critical reception ==
On Americana Highways, John Apice said, "The 3rd CD in this impeccable package features more ambitious playing with what's an abbreviated Grateful Dead performance.... Several tracks are classic Dead songs & traditional pieces mixed with some covers that sparkle in the Dead oeuvre."

== Track listing ==
Disc 1

Country Joe McDonald:

1. Wavy's welcome – 2:24
2. "Save the Whales" (McDonald) – 4:21
3. "Janis" (McDonald) – 3:46
4. "Picks & Lasers" (McDonald) – 6:23
5. "Slide Trombone Blues" (McDonald) – 4:24
6. "Oh! Susanna" (Stephen Foster) – 1:17
7. "Yankee Doodle (He's No Fool)" (McDonald) – 2:08
8. Country Joe dedicates tonight's cheer – :48
9. "Feel-Like-I'm-Fixin'-to-Die Rag" (McDonald) – 3:21
10. Wavy Gravy runs things like a Swiss watch – :34

Rosalie Sorrels with Mitch Greenhill:

11. "The Loving of the Game" (Pat Garvey, Victoria Garvey) – 5:42
12. "If You Love Me" (Malvina Reynolds) – 4:49
13. "12 Adler Place" (Sorrels) – 3:35
14. "Postcard from India" (Sorrels) – 3:41
15. "You’ve Got to Go to Sleep Alone" (Jimmie Dale Gilmore) – 5:21
16. "Scared to Be Alone" (Dory Previn) – 5:55
17. "I Remember Loving You" (Utah Phillips) – 5:57

Disc 2

Kate Wolf with Nina Gerber and Ford James:

1. Wavy introduces Kate Wolf – 1:17
2. "You’re Not Standing Like You Used To" (Wolf) – 4:37
3. "Shining!" (Wolf) – 3:14
4. "20/20 Vision" (Joe Allison, Milton Estes) – 3:32
5. "Unfinished Life" (Wolf) – 5:41
6. "Eyes of a Painter" (Wolf) – 4:39
7. "Let’s Get Together" (Dino Valenti) – with Wavy Gravy – 4:32
8. "Like a River" (Wolf) – 4:14

Rhythm Devils (Mickey Hart, Bill Kreutzmann):

9. "Rhythm Devils" (Hart, Kreutzmann) – 20:06

Disc 3

Jerry Garcia & Bob Weir with Mickey Hart, Bill Kreutzmann, and John Kahn:

1. Introduction and tuning – 3:32
2. "Deep Elem Blues" (traditional) – 5:32
3. "Dark Hollow" (Bill Browning) – 4:40
4. "Jack-a-Roe" (traditional) – 3:34
5. "Monkey and the Engineer" (Jesse Fuller) – 2:44
6. "Friend of the Devil" (Garcia, John Dawson, Robert Hunter) – 6:58
7. "El Paso" (Marty Robbins) – 4:17
8. "Oh, Babe, It Ain't No Lie" (Elizabeth Cotten) – 4:45
9. "On the Road Again" (traditional) – 3:48
10. "Oh Boy!" (Sonny West, Bill Tilghman, Norman Petty) – 2:23

== Personnel ==
Musicians

- Country Joe McDonald – vocals, guitar, trombone, harmonica, tambourine
- Rosalie Sorrels – vocals, guitar
- Mitch Greenhill – guitar
- Kate Wolf – vocals, guitar
- Nina Gerber – guitar, mandolin, vocals
- Ford James – bass, vocals
- Mickey Hart – drums, percussion
- Bill Kreutzmann – drums, percussion
- Jerry Garcia – vocals, guitar
- Bob Weir – vocals, guitar
- John Kahn – bass

Production

- Recording: Owsley Stanley
- Mastering: Jeffrey Norman
- Tape to digital transfers: John Chester, Jamie Howarth
- Book and packaging design, illustration: Susan Archie
- Cover lettering: Kathryn S. Renta
- Photography: Larry Hulst, Nicholas Wilson
- Executive producers: Starfinder Stanley, Hawk
- Release producer: Hawk
- Liner notes essays: Starfinder Stanley, Nicholas G. Meriwether, Mitch Greenhill, Hawk, Gary Burnett, Jesse Jarnow, Pete Bell
