= Tom Wisner =

American folk musician, activist and educator

Tom Wisner (June 29, 1930 – April 2, 2010) was an American folk musician, activist, and educator. Known as the "Bard of the Chesapeake," Wisner wrote hundreds of poems and songs about life around the Chesapeake Bay.

== Early life and education ==
Tom Wisner was born in 1930 in Washington, D.C. He grew up in D.C. and in Prince George's County, spending time with family along the James River in the Chesapeake Bay watershed.

He graduated from Anacostia High School in 1950 and volunteered for the Korean War, fighting with the U.S. Air Force, at his father's urging. After returning in 1954, he obtained a bachelor's degree in biology from Hartwick College. He later pursued some graduate studies in ecology at Cornell, but left before obtaining a doctorate, instead working as a naturalist in California.

Wisner then returned to Maryland, where he eventually became an educator at the University of Maryland's Chesapeake Biological Laboratory until his retirement in the late 1990s.

== Music ==
Wisner established himself as a folk singer beginning in the mid-1960s, writing and singing songs about the Chesapeake Bay. Over his career, he produced hundreds of poems and songs on the subject, earning him the title "Bard of the Chesapeake." He was primarily interested in the bay's ecology, flora, and fauna, and the water itself.

His albums about the bay included Chesapeake Born, Equilibrium, We've Got to Come Full Circle, and Made of Water. The 1979 album Chesapeake Born was recorded by Folkways Records, and some of its songs were included in Smithsonian Folkways' Classic Maritime Music compilation. Some have argued its title track should be Maryland's state song.

For his contributions, Wisner received the 2002 John Denver Award of the World Folk Music Association

== Educator and activist ==
Wisner was a committed environmentalist who sought to fight pollution and other threats to the Chesapeake Bay. He also strove to educate young and old about the watershed's importance.

Early in his career, Wisner had taught high school biology. Then, in the 1980s, he worked with students at Hollywood Elementary School on art projects and to record music. In that period, he also taught a course about the Chesapeake at the University of Maryland, College Park.

In 1999, he co-founded Chestory, the Center for the Chesapeake Story.

== Death and legacy ==
Wisner died in 2010 at age 79. The following year, his collaborator Sara Ebenreck Leeland published a book of Wisner's writings, titled Gather ’Round Chesapeake: Tom Wisner’s Vision.
