= Bear's Sonic Journals: You're Doin' Fine =

Live album by John Hammond, recorded in 1973

Live album by John Hammond
- Released: November 22, 2024
- Recorded: June 2 – 3, 1973
- Venue: The Boarding House
- Genre: Blues
- Length: 195:55
- Label: Owsley Stanley Foundation

John Hammond chronology
Timeless (2014)	Bear's Sonic Journals: You're Doin' Fine (2024)

Bear's Sonic Journals chronology
Bear's Sonic Journals: Sing Out! (2024)	Bear's Sonic Journals: You're Doin' Fine (2024)	Bear's Sonic Journals: Concordance: 150 Years of Charles Ives (2026)

Bear's Sonic Journals: You're Doin' Fine is a three-CD live album by John Hammond. It was recorded on June 2 and 3, 1973, at the Boarding House in San Francisco. It was released on November 22, 2024.

Subtitled Blues at the Boarding House, the album features Hammond performing solo, singing and playing acoustic guitar and harmonica. It was recorded by audio engineer and LSD chemist Owsley "Bear" Stanley. It includes a 60-page booklet of essays, photos, and illustrations.

== Critical reception ==
On Americana Highways, Bill Bentley wrote, "This collection of live recordings from San Francisco’s Boarding House done over two nights in 1973 are about as pure as music gets, and also beautifully presented.... John Hammond's vocals, guitar and harmonica are delivered with a blend of pure power and fine finesse like he's creating a genre all his own."

Also on Americana Highways, John Apice said, "This is a wonderfully designed CD package with reinforced binding & perfect bound liner notes. There are photographs & detailed credits.... In a word, the show is spare but delivered with the charcoal-voiced delicacy of Hammond. This is the way the blues was intended – no showboating, no fireworks, just layering on the levels of bluesy guitar notes on his resonator guitar."

On Rock & Blues Muse, Hal Horowitz wrote, "It’s a wonderful listen, not just for riveting performances... but because Stanley captures the sound from the small 150 capacity venue with such clarity, it seems like Hammond is in the room with us.... You're Doin' Fine is a near perfect package highlighted by Hammond's exhaustive, energized and, well, encyclopedic approach to music that never feels dated or stale, especially in the hands of a master like him."

== Track listing ==
Disc 1

June 2, 1973:

1. "Wang Dang Doodle" (Willie Dixon) – 4:36
2. "Gambling Blues" (L'il Son Jackson) – 4:44
3. "I Can't Be Satisfied" (Muddy Waters) – 6:13
4. "Hitchhiking Woman" (Black Ace) – 6:47
5. "Shake for Me" (Dixon) – 4:25
6. "Honeymoon Blues" (Robert Johnson) – 2:10
7. "Rag Mama" (Blind Boy Fuller) – 2:59
8. "Sweet Home Chicago" (Johnson) – 5:50
9. "I Wish You Would" (Billy Boy Arnold) – 4:00
10. "King Bee" (Slim Harpo) – 5:26
11. "Help Me" (Ralph Bass, Dixon, Sonny Boy Williamson) – 4:16
12. "Death Bells" (Lightnin' Hopkins) – 7:18
13. "Honeymoon Blues" (Johnson) – 3:40

Disc 2

June 2, 1973, continued:

1. "You're So Fine" (Little Walter) – 4:59
2. "Look on Yonder's Wall" (Elmore James, Marshall Sehorn) – 4:53
3. "Travelling Riverside Blues" (Johnson) – 8:48
4. "Little Rain" (Ewart Abner, Jimmy Reed) – 3:35
5. "Truckin' Little Baby" (Fuller) – 3:27
6. "It's Too Late, She's Gone" (Chuck Willis) – 2:51
7. "You Don't Love Me" (Willie Cobbs) – 3:43

June 3, 1973:

8. "Ridin' in the Moonlight" (Howlin' Wolf, Jules Taub) – 3:06
9. "Malted Milk" (Johnson) – 3:02
10. "I Can't Be Satisfied" (Waters) – 5:29
11. "It Hurts Me Too" (Tampa Red) – 3:15
12. "Boogie Chillen'" (John Lee Hooker, Bernard Besman) – 4:27
13. "She Moves Me" (Waters) – 2:40
14. "Rag Mama" (Fuller) – 1:31
15. "Ask Me Nice" (Mose Allison) – 3:49
16. "Love Changing Blues" (Blind Willie McTell) – 5:20
17. "Preachin' Blues" (Son House) – 4:36

Disc 3

June 3, 1973, continued:

1. "Go On to School" (Abner, Reed) – 3:27
2. "Ride 'til I Die" (Hooker, Taub) – 4:54
3. "Drunken Hearted Man" (Johnson) – 3:53
4. "Look on Yonder's Wall" (James, Sehorn) – 5:35
5. "Terraplane Blues" (Johnson) – 5:28
6. "No Money Down" (Chuck Berry) – 3:42
7. "Truckin' Little Baby" (Fuller) – 2:59
8. "Ground Hog Blues" (Hooker) – 4:40
9. "Junco Partner" (Robert Ellen, Mack Ellen) – 3:53
10. "I'm Leaving You" (Frank J. Guida, William Deal, Joseph Royster) – 2:58
11. "From Four Until Late" (Johnson) – 3:31
12. "Travelling Riverside Blues" (Johnson) – 5:33
13. "Hitchhiking Woman" (Ace) – 5:06
14. "Shake for Me" (Dixon) – 4:43
15. "It's Too Late, She's Gone" (Willis) – 3:35

== Personnel ==
Musicians:

- John Hammond – acoustic guitar, harmonica, vocals

Production:

- Recording: Owsley Stanley
- Mastering: Jeffrey Norman
- Tape to digital transfers: John Chester, Jamie Howarth
- Booklet and packaging design: Darryl Norsen
- Cover illustration: Richard Biffle
- Line drawings: Nina Stanley
- Executive producers: Starfinder Stanley, Hawk
- Producer for release: Hawk
- Liner notes essays: Starfinder Stanley, Redbird Ferguson, Jorma Kaukonen, Pete Bell, Hawk, Tom Waits, Kathleen Brennan
