= Sally Fingerett =

American folk singer-songwriter

Sally Fingerett (born December 25, 1955, in Chicago, Illinois) is an American folk singer-songwriter. She is a founding member of Four Bitchin' Babes and recorded many albums with the band.

Fingerett joined the Chicago folk scene while a student at the University of Illinois at Chicago, inspired by such artists as Steve Goodman and John Prine. She later moved to Nashville, Tennessee and became the lead singer for the bluegrass band Buffalo Gals. She also toured with artists such as John Hartford and Bill Monroe before beginning her solo career.

She met and married producer Dan Green, and they collaborated on producing commercial music. Green produced four of Fingerett's solo CDs, as well as the Four Bitchin' Babes album Fax It, Charge It, Don't Ask Me What's For Dinner.

In 1994, Fingerett had to suspend recording and performing after contracting a virus that paralyzed her vocal cords. She recovered use of her voice a year later. Soon after, Christine Lavin passed a recording of Fingerett's song Home Is Where The Heart Is (about accepting people regardless of sexual orientation) to Peter, Paul and Mary, who covered the song on their album Lifelines. Later, she divorced Green, and created a one-woman comedy/music show, It's A Crazy World….But Where Else Would We Live...the Musical Musings of a Mental Yentl.

Fingerett published her first book in 2015, The Mental Yentl: Stories from a Lifelong Student of Crazy. The book has a companion CD.

Fingerett lives in Columbus, Ohio with her husband, Michael Stan. Their three children are EJ, Max, and Aaron.

== Discography ==
- Enclosed
- Unraveled
- Ghost Town Girl
- My Good Company
- A Woman's Gotta Do Her Thing
