= Anacostia High School =

Anacostia Senior High School
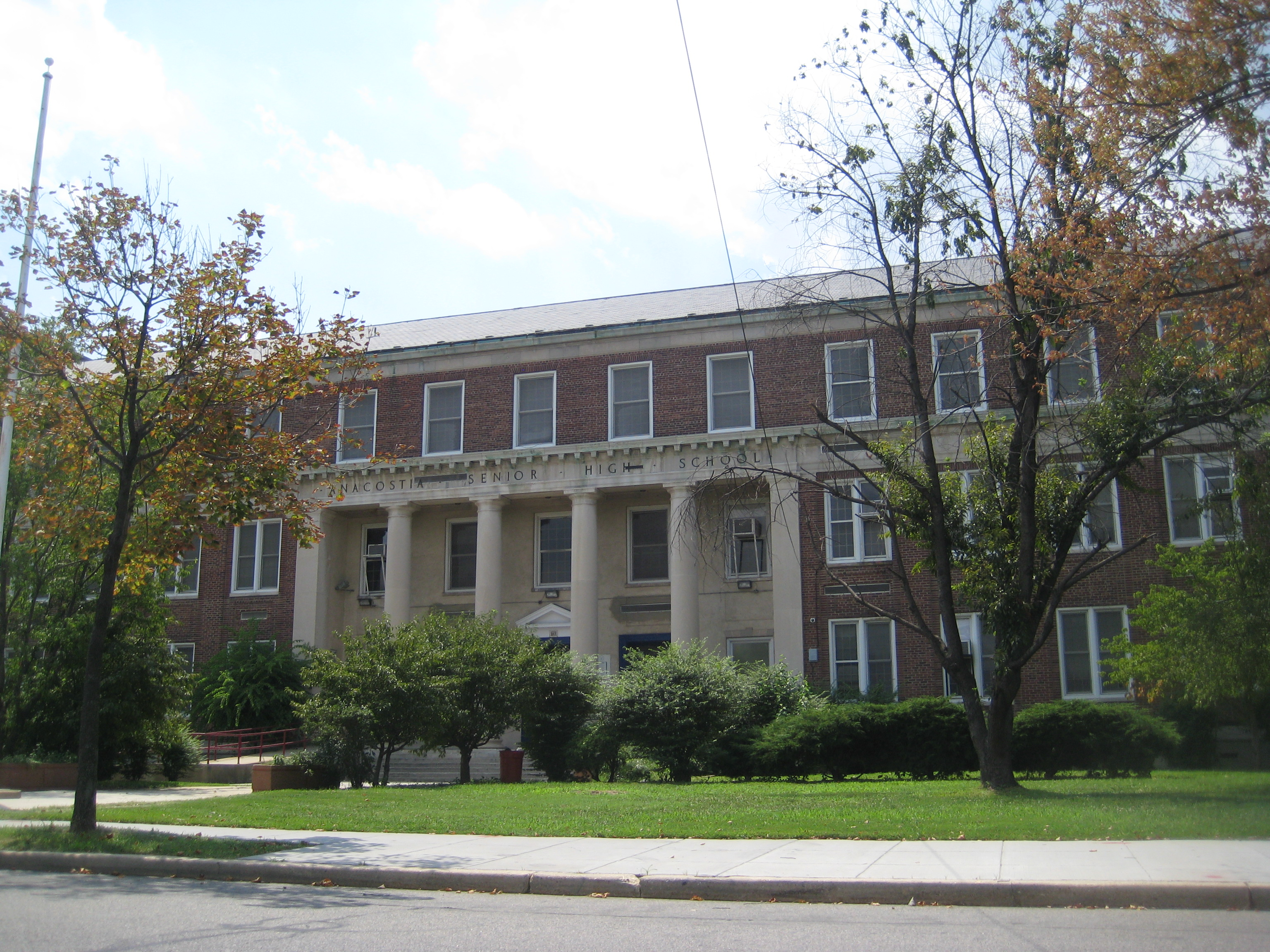
- Anacostia Senior High School

Location
- 1601 16th Street Southeast; Ward 8 Washington, D.C. 20020; United States; 38°52′11″N 76°58′57″W

Information
- School type: Public high school
- Established: 1937 (89 years ago)
- Status: Open
- School board: District of Columbia State Board of Education
- School district: District of Columbia Public Schools
- NCES District ID: 1100030
- School code: DC-001-450
- CEEB code: 090005
- NCES School ID: 110003000085
- Principal: Kenneth Walker
- Teaching staff: 37 (on an FTE basis)
- Grades: 9–12
- Gender: Coeducational
- Enrollment: 287 (2022-2023)
  - Grade 9: 105
  - Grade 10: 90
  - Grade 11: 55
  - Grade 12: 37
- Student to teacher ratio: 7.76
- Hours in school day: 6.5
- Area: 247,000 square feet (22,900 m^{2})
- Campus type: Urban
- Colors: Blue and scarlet
- Athletics conference: DCSAA, DCIAA
- Team name: Indians
- USNWR ranking: 13,394–17,857
- Budget: $9.0M
- Communities served: Anacostia, Fairlawn, Randle Highlands, Fort Stanton, Barry Farm, Woodland, Skyland, Dupont Park, Penn Branch
- Feeder schools: Excel Academy; Kramer Middle School; Sousa Middle School
- Graduates: 49%
- Website: www.anacostiahigh.org

Anacostia High School is a public high school in Anacostia, in the Southeast quadrant of the District of Columbia.

== History ==
In August 2009, Friendship Public Charter School partnered with DC Public Schools to manage the high school. As a result, the school became known as the Academies at Anacostia and was split into four separate academies. In 2009–10, there were two ninth-grade academies (Sojourner Truth and Charles Drew), one 10-12th grade academy (Frederick Douglass), and one academy for under-credited and overage students (Matthew Henson). In 2010–11, the two ninth-grade academies will become 9-10th grade academies, while the larger 10-12th grade academy (Frederick Douglass) will become 11-12th. Matthew Henson academy will stay intact. In 2011–12, Sojourner Truth and Charles Drew will expand to 9-11th grades, while Frederick Douglass will only be seniors. In 2012–13, Sojourner Truth and Charles Drew will be fully operational 9-12th grade academies, and Frederick Douglass will no longer exist.

This setup is based on the Small Learning Community (SLC) model.

Built in 1935, with subsequent additions in the 1940s, 50s, and 70s, the Anacostia High School was in desperate need of a complete renovation and modernization that would not only bring the school up to the highest educational standards but would also serve to transform the school building into a simple, understated canvas for the art and lives of its students. Architectural design firm Sorg Architects designed the renovation of Anacostia High School to restore the exterior of the original building steeped in sustainable design practice.

== Notable alumni ==
- Jessica Adair – former WNBA player
- Craig Anderson, former MLB player
- Lonny Baxter, NBA basketball player
- Jean Carnahan, former U.S. senator from Missouri
- Mel Carnahan, former governor of Missouri
- Art Faircloth, former NFL player
- Ronnie Gilbert, folk singer
- Frederick Drew Gregory, NASA astronaut and NASA deputy administrator
- Cato June, former NFL player
- Lovell Pinkney, former NFL player
- Reggie Rucker, former NFL player
- Gene Schroeder, former NFL player
- Tom Wisner, folk singer

== Notable events ==
On June 11, 2010, First Lady of the United States Michelle Obama gave the commencement address to the Class of 2010.
