= Debi Smith =

American folk singer-songwriter

Debi Smith is an American folk singer-songwriter. She has been a member of Four Bitchin' Babes since 1994, with whom she continues to tour.

== Career ==
Smith began her career as a soloist after graduating from The College of Wooster in Ohio (she also briefly attended The College of William & Mary for some of her coursework) and busking in San Francisco.

She worked with National Endowment for the Arts and then performed with the all-female Celtic group The Hags, and began playing the bodhrán during that time. In 1980, she began performing with her sister, Megan Smith, as The Smith Sisters. They released five albums together on Flying Fish Records, which featured accompaniment from musicians such as Doc and Merle Watson, Sam Bush, and Mark O'Connor.

Smith's first solo CD, In My Dreams, was co-produced by John Jennings, and she has released six more solo albums since, some on the Shanachie label. She continues to tour as a soloist and as a member of The Four Bitchin' Babes, along with occasional appearances with The Smith Sisters. Smith, whose music has been Grammy-nominated, has also been a multiple recipient of Wammie awards (Washington Area Music Awards).

Debi has appeared on Garrison Keillor's Prairie Home Companion, All Things Considered, Mountain Stage, Radio Smithsonian, CBS Sunday Morning, CMT, and Ken Burn's PBS series, "The National Parks" and "The Roosevelts." She has performed at such U.S. venues as The Kennedy Center, Wolftrap, EPCOT Center, Philadelphia's Keswick, and L.A.'s Wadsworth Theaters, and has toured as far away as Russia.

She and her mother co-edited the book "Look Up at The Hawks," based on Debi's grandmother's 1930s–40s dust bowl diary. Debi was also included in Random House books' "Life's a Stitch."

== Personal life ==
Debi continues to live in Falls Church, outside of the Washington, D.C., with her husband, Michael Jaworek, VP/Promoter of The Birchmere nightclub.

== Discography ==
- Bluebird (The Smith Sisters) (1984)
- Mockingbird (The Smith Sisters) (1986)
- Roadrunner (The Smith Sisters) (1989)
- I See the Moon (The Smith Sisters) (1991)
- A Canary's Song (The Smith Sisters) (1993)
- In My Dreams (1994)
- More Than Once (1998)
- Red Bird (2001)
- Cupid (2005)
- The Soprano (2007)
- Hits and Holidays (2013)
- "If I Were an Angel" (2014)
- "Deep Tracks" (2018)
- "Then and Now" (2021)
