= Lovell Pinkney =

American football player (born 1972)

No. 83
- Position: Tight end

Personal information
- Born: August 18, 1972 (age 54); Washington, D.C., U.S.
- Listed height: 6 ft 5 in (1.96 m)
- Listed weight: 248 lb (112 kg)

Career information
- High school: Anacostia (Washington, D.C.)
- College: Texas
- NFL draft: 1995: 4th round, 115th overall pick

Career history
- St. Louis Rams (1995–1996); Green Bay Packers (1997)*; Grand Rapids Rampage (1998)
- * Offseason or practice squad member only

Awards and highlights
- First-team All-SWC (1993)

Career NFL statistics
- Receptions: 1
- Receiving yards: 13
- Stats at Pro Football Reference

Career AFL statistics
- Receptions: 12
- Receiving yards: 162
- Receiving touchdowns: 4
- Stats at ArenaFan.com

Lovell Pinkney (born August 18, 1972) is an American former professional football player who was a tight end in the National Football League (NFL). He was an all-conference player playing college football for the Texas Longhorns and a fourth round draft pick of the St. Louis Rams in the 1995 NFL draft. He was with the Rams for two seasons, the Green Bay Packers for the 1997 training camp and with the AFL's Grand Rapids Rampage.

== Early life ==
Pinkney was born in Washington, DC and played high school football at Anacostia High School in Washington, D.C. He had been spotted by his high school football coach as a talent while playing football and basketball in junior high school, and enticed him to go to high school and play football instead of selling drugs on the corner, which is what he had been doing. He helped lead Anacostia to the DCIAA East title in 1991.

He finished his career as first-team selection to the Washington Post All-Met football team, Washington, DC player of the year and a Parade All-American.

He was recruited by several big schools including Miami and Syracuse, but chose Texas.

== College career ==
Pinkney attended the University of Texas at Austin, where he played football for the Longhorns from 1992 to 1994. He finished his career with 15 career receiving touchdowns, which was a school record at the time.

In his freshman year he had the first of his four 100+ yard receiving games against Syracuse. In that game he had 140 yards receiving, which was a school record at the time for single-game receiving yards by a freshman and a 73-yard reception, which was also a school record for freshmen at the time. He also had 3 touchdown receptions that year which was, at the time, a school record for touchdown receptions by a freshman. That season he combined with fellow freshman Mike Adams for 729 yards receiving. That was also a school record at the time for most receiving yards by a duo of freshmen and as of 2024 was still the 2nd most ever.

In his sophomore year he was a first-team All-Southwest Conference pick and had the three other 100+ yard receiving games including his career high 150 yards against SMU. In that game he caught a 61-yard pass from Shea Morenz that was, at the time, tied for the longest pass by a Freshman quarterback in school history.

Prior to his junior year, he and Adams were investigated for a trip they took to Los Angeles out of concern that they had met with an agent. They were cleared, but were suspended for two games during the investigation and for initially lying about the trip. In his junior year he was named to the All-SWC second-team and helped the Longhorns to become Conference Co-Champions and win the 1994 Sun Bowl. He chose to forego his senior year and declare for the NFL draft early.

== Professional career ==
Pinkney was selected by the Rams in the fourth round, #115 overall, of the 1995 NFL draft. The Rams moved him to tight end, but he only ended up playing eight games for them in 1995. He was cut by the Rams at the end of the 1996 training camp. During the 1996 playoffs he was signed by the Green Bay Packers but did not play for them during the playoffs. He left the Packers during training camp in 1997 for personal reasons - his mother needed dialysis and his marriage was breaking up - and was placed on waivers. At the time he said football was no longer any fun.

Pinkney found Christianity and decided to give football another chance in the Arena Football League. In 1998 he played for the Grand Rapids Rampage as wide receiver and linebacker and was a standout player, but he broke his arm after four games and was placed on the injured reserve. He was waived by the Rampage the next year before the first preseason game.
