= Alonzo Conant =

American politician

Alonzo Conant (8 October 1914 – 4 January 1962) was an American lawyer and political activist from Maine. A member of the Republican Party, he served as a Municipal Court Judge, Maine House of Representatives, Director of Enforcement Division, Maine Liquor Commission, and Legislative Agent for the Maine Good Roads Association, now called the Maine Better Transportation Association.

== Early life and education ==
He was born in Turner, Maine son of Alonzo and Lottie (Noble) Conant. He received his early education at public schools in Auburn, Maine, Maine graduating from Edward Little High School. Conant received his A.B. in Economics from Bates College in 1936, attended Peabody Law School 1936-39 where during his first two years he was Editor-in-Chief of the Peabody Law Review where he ranked highest on State Bar Exam. During World War II, Conant served with the U.S. Navy from 1942–1946, as a gunnery officer/Lt.(JG) in the Atlantic, Mediterranean, European, and North Sea areas. He was awarded a citation by the Navy “for service rendered to the United States Naval Reserve in 1947.” He served as Legal Officer at the Naval Station, Portland, and assistant Legal Officer at the New York Naval Station, New York City.

== Political, legal and judicial career ==
Conant was politically active throughout his adult life, represented Auburn in the Maine legislature in 1941, and served as Republican State Committeeman from Androscoggin County and Republican Committee Chair (1948–49). Conant was admitted to the Maine bar in 1939, was appointed by three Maine Governors: Horace Hildreth, Frederick G. Payne, and Burton M. Cross to serve as Judge for Auburn Municipal Court for three successive appointments (1946–1958)[5] and enjoyed a distinguished career as an attorney and jurist. He served as chairman of the Juvenile Delinquency Committee of the Municipal Judges Association, dedimus justice and disclosure commissioner and chairman of the Legislative Committee of the Androscoggin County Law Library. Conant was a Legislative Agent for the Maine Good Roads Association from 1955-1961. He was an authority on state highway matters. Throughout his career, he received special recognition numerous times for his work on behalf of individuals and groups. In 1955 he was elected Judge Advocate of the VFW Department of Maine. Too, he was active in numerous civic and social groups and Masonic bodies, including Tranquil Lodge of Masons (Scottish Rites Bodies), and Kora Temple.

== Personal life ==
Conant was a member of the Universalist Church (Board of Trustees), moderator of the parish and Sunday school teacher. He was a Civil War enthusiast, Standardbred horse authority in addition to being an Italian opera and Gilbert and Sullivan devotee. He was married to Ruperta Helen Turner of Vassalboro, Maine in 1942 until his early death in 1962 from complications of Polycystic kidney disease. Conant had two daughters, Sue Turner and Ellen Amelia.
