= Camille West =

American songwriter

Camille West is an American satirical folk singer-songwriter. She was a member of Four Bitchin' Babes from 1997 to 2004. Her songs include "L.A.F.F. (Ladies Against Fanny Floss)", a protest song about bathing suits that are not designed to accommodate women's bodies; "B.O.B. (Battery Operated Boyfriend)", an ode to vibrators; "The Nervous Wreck of Edna Fitzgerald", a parody of Gordon Lightfoot's "The Wreck of the Edmund Fitzgerald"; and "Viagra in the Waters", which was voted "Funniest Song of the Year" on the Dr. Demento radio show in 2000.

West grew up in Queens.

== Discography ==
- Suburban Mother from Hell (1992)
- Mother Tongue (1995)
- Diva's Day Off (1999)
