= Tom Rowe (musician) =

American singer

Thomas Joseph Rowe (November 4, 1950, Lewiston, Maine – January 17, 2004, Portland, Maine) was the bass player and a singer in the folk trios Schooner Fare and Turkey Hollow. He was noted for playing a model XL2 Steinberger bass guitar. Born to Charles "Bud" Rowe, and his wife, Thoma, he had two brothers named Russ and Chuck, and a sister named Shirley. He went to school in Auburn, Maine and graduated from Edward Little High School as part of the class of 1969. He majored in Music Education at Gorham State College, now the University of Southern Maine, though never graduated. In 1975, Rowe joined the Maine folk/rock group Devonsquare. Three months after joining, the band split into two separate groups, and he went along with Steve and Chuck Romanoff, to form Schooner Fare. As part of the band, Tom sang and played electric bass, pennywhistle, and sometimes guitar. He also wrote a number of songs for the band, which included "Salt Water Farm," "Big House, Middle House, Back House, Barn," "John Cook," "The Royal Tar," and "Way Down Below."

In 1991 Rowe released a solo album titled "Whistle Up a Storm," much of which he recorded with his son, Dave Rowe, at the controls. (Note: In addition to Dave, Tom has four daughters: Erikka, Marin, Summer, and Toni Lyn.) In 1992 Tom and son formed Rowe by Rowe. After six years as a duo, Rowe by Rowe added Rowe's longtime friend Denny Breau, to form Turkey Hollow Consort; later called simply Turkey Hollow. He was diagnosed with throat cancer in November 2003, and died on January 17, 2004, due to complications from the cancer treatment. Rowe was awarded the Kate Wolf Memorial Award posthumously by the World Folk Music Association in 2004.

Schooner Fare continues to perform: the Romanoff brothers decided against replacing him, and perform now as a duo. Turkey Hollow continued together for about two more years, but subsequently disbanded. Since then, Dave Rowe continues to perform as a soloist.

== External links and references ==
- "Tom Rowe" (obituary). Outer Green Records web site. 2005-03-05.

Specific
