= Batteux =

Batteux is a surname. Notable people with the surname include:

- Albert Batteux (1919–2003), French footballer and manager
- Charles Batteux (1713–1780), French philosopher and writer on aesthetics
- Joël Batteux (1943–2021), French politician
