= Four Bitchin' Babes =

American humorous folk music group

The Four Bitchin' Babes is a group of female singer-songwriters with rotating membership performing mainly humorous, satirical, or light-hearted songs in the folk genre. As of June 2022, the touring group consists of Sally Fingerett, Deirdre Flint, Christine Lavin, and Debi Smith. The artists have made numerous albums and have worked with producer Jeff Bova.

== History ==
Christine Lavin founded the band in 1990. She produced the compilation album On a Winter's Night, then put together a road show of the artists who appeared on it: Patty Larkin, Megon McDonough, Sally Fingerett, and Lavin. The foursome toured throughout the United States, after which Lavin decided to create a live album of their performance at The Birchmere entitled Buy Me, Bring Me, Take Me, Don't Mess My Hair, released on Rounder Records in 1990.

Larkin then signed with Windham Hill Records and left the band; she was replaced by Julie Gold, best known for writing the song "From a Distance". The group continued to tour and released their second album, Buy Me… Volume II in 1993. In the meantime, other artists would substitute in concert for band members who were unavailable, such as Cheryl Wheeler, Janis Ian, and Mary Travers. In 1994, Debi Smith replaced Julie Gold, and they released their third album Fax It, Charge It, Don't Ask Me What's For Dinner in 1995 on Shanachie Records.

In 1997, Lavin chose Camille West to replace her in the band, and the new lineup released the live album Gabby Road: Out Of The Mouths Of Babes, also recorded at the Birchmere. In 2001, the band released the album The Babes: Beyond Bitchin', produced by Jeff Bova, in addition to a live concert DVD. McDonough left the band in 2001 to perform a one-woman show, and she was replaced by Suzzy Roche, formerly of The Roches. In 2002, they released the album Some Assembly Required. In 2004, both West and Roche left the group and were replaced by Nancy Moran and Deirdre Flint. In 2006, they toured for their CD "Hormonal Imbalance: A Mood Swinging Musical Revue".

As of June 2022, the Four Bitch' Babes are touring, including a stop at The Birchmere, where they recorded their first album and see as an "unofficial home base". It may be their last formal tour and Smith, one of the co-leaders, says "We are winding it down".

There have been eleven different members (not counting guest or touring "Babes"), with the Four Bitchin' Babes currently consisting of Sally Fingerett, Deirdre Flint, Christine Lavin, and Debi Smith. Only Fingerett has been a member for their entire history.

== Songwriting ==
Typically, the Babes' albums consist of songs written by the individual members, all of whom have or have had solo careers as well. Songs appearing on their albums, such as "Microwave Life" (by McDonough), "B.O.B. (Battery-Operated Boyfriend)" and "L.A.F.F. (Ladies Against Fanny Floss)" (by West), and "Don't Mess With Me (I'm Somebody's Mother)" (by Fingerett), satirize modern life, especially from a mature female perspective.

== Deirdre Flint ==
Deirdre Flint
- Born: Deirdre Flint
- Genres: Folk
- Occupations: Singer, songwriter, teacher
- Instruments: Vocals acoustic guitar bass guitar
- Years active: 1999–present
- Website: https://deirdreflint.net/

Deirdre Flint is an American satirical folk-rock singer-songwriter. A former elementary school teacher, she joined Four Bitchin' Babes in 2005.

Her music has appeared on the Dr. Demento radio show and on the television show Nip/Tuck, as well as on The Learning Channel's "A Dating Story" and documentary "Always A Bridesmaid". Her songs, such as "Cheerleader," "The Boob Fairy," and "Past Life Regressed," deal with offbeat topics, often from the perspective of a ditzy female character. She has performed in more than 50 venues across the United States, including The Kennedy Center, and has been reviewed in publications such as The Christian Science Monitor, The Washington Post, and Billboard Magazine, which called her "Shuffleboard Queens" album, "grown-up satire with a non-cynical wink".

== Awards and honors ==
Flint won the New Folk songwriting prize at the Kerrville Folk Festival in 2000, and was Falcon Ridge Folk Festival Showcase Artist that same year.

== Discography ==
Buy Me, Bring Me, Take Me, Don't Mess My Hair: Life According to Four Bitchin' Babes	1990	Sally Fingerett	Megon McDonough	Christine Lavin	Patty Larkin
Buy Me, Bring Me, Take Me, Don't Mess My Hair: Life According to Four Bitchin' Babes Volume II	1993	Sally Fingerett	Megon McDonough	Christine Lavin	Julie Gold
Fax It, Charge It, Don't Ask Me What's For Dinner: More Life According To Four Bitchin' Babes	1994	Sally Fingerett	Megon McDonough	Christine Lavin	Debi Smith
Gabby Road: Out of the Mouths of Babes	1997	Sally Fingerett	Megon McDonough	Camille West	Debi Smith
The Babes: Beyond Bitchin'	2001	Sally Fingerett	Megon McDonough	Camille West	Debi Smith
Meet the Babes (DVD)	2001	Sally Fingerett	Megon McDonough	Camille West	Debi Smith
Some Assembly Required	2002	Sally Fingerett	Suzzy Roche	Camille West	Debi Smith
Hormonal Imbalance...A Mood-Swinging Musical Revue	2006	Sally Fingerett	Deirdre Flint	Nancy Moran	Debi Smith
Diva Nation...Where Music, Laughter & Girlfriends Reign!	2009	Sally Fingerett	Deirdre Flint	Nancy Moran	Debi Smith
Mid Life Vices...A Guilt Free Musical Revue	2012	Sally Fingerett	Deirdre Flint	Marcy Marxer	Debi Smith

=== Deirdre Flint discography ===
- The Christmas Sweater Song (2012)
- The Shuffleboard Queens (1999)
- Then Again (2002)
