= David Batteau =

American singer-songwriter

- Born: David Hurst Batteau; June 25, 1949 (age 77); Boston, Massachusetts
- Genres: Alternative rock, pop
- Occupations: Singer, songwriter
- Instruments: Vocals, guitar
- Years active: 1971–present
- Label: A&M Records (1973–1977)
- Website: MySpace account

David Hurst Batteau (born June 25, 1949) is an American singer-songwriter. Batteau is the son of Blanca Batteau and Dr. Dwight Wayne Batteau, of Harvard University and Tufts University. He is the brother of singer-songwriters Robin Batteau and Dwight Jr.

== History ==
Batteau is widely credited for writing songs for various entertainers, including Seals and Crofts, Trisha Yearwood, Michael Sembello and Shawn Colvin. He also co-wrote several songs with Madeleine Peyroux and Larry Klein for Peyroux's 2009 album, Bare Bones.

He has also focused on solo work, and has released one solo album, Happy in Hollywood (1976) on A&M Records. Batteau had previously worked with his brother Robin as Batteaux, releasing one album on Columbia Records in 1971. This album contains the song "Tell Her She's Lovely" which was covered by El Chicano in 1973.

In the mid-1980s, Batteau formed the Pop/New Wave band Nomo, which released one album, The Great Unknown, in 1985, scoring a minor hit with "Red Lipstick" before disbanding. He also wrote and performed the song "Walk in Love," which was later covered by The Manhattan Transfer, reaching Number 12 on the UK Singles Chart.

== Discography ==
=== Albums ===
- 1976: Happy in Hollywood
- 1993: Soul Mission

=== Singles ===
- 1976: "Walk in Love"
