= Dwight Wayne Batteau =

Dwight Wayne Batteau, D.Sc. (September 25, 1916 – October 26, 1967) was an acoustic engineer. His research established that the shape of humans' outer ears (auricles) provides directional hearing. He also developed a "Man to Dolphin Translator" which allowed 2-way communication by converting in both directions between vowel sounds and whistles. He was a professor at Harvard University, then at Tufts University and was an officer of acoustic research companies, United Research Inc. and Listening Post, Inc.

== Outer ear's role in directional ability ==
In 1961 Batteau found that humans' external ears do not just magnify sound, and that ability to locate the direction a sound comes from is not just derived from the difference in arrival times between left and right eardrums. External ears channel sound in four pathways of different lengths and resonance, so each sound reaches the eardrum four times, and the slight differences in sound give far more directional ability than the difference in arrival times between the ears. These paths explain why people who hear in only one ear have directional ability. His Royal Society publication has been cited 684 times through 2023.

== Dolphin translator ==
The Man to Dolphin Translator was developed with Peter Markey and Stephen Moshier under contracts for the US Navy in Point Mugu California and Hawaii. It translated seven vowel sounds spoken by humans to pure sine wave whistles from 7,000 Hz to 15,000 Hz. Thus the humans did not need to learn a whistled language, and the dolphins did not need to make human sounds. The equipment was analog, with filters which were able to distinguish vowel sounds and play the appropriate whistle frequencies. Other filters processed the dolphins' whistles, and when the dolphins whistled at the seven defined frequencies the equipment played the corresponding vowel sounds in speakers as well as displaying both sides of the communication on oscilloscopes. Batteau's team trained the dolphins to take certain actions when they heard particular sequences. He noted the work could be extended into a two-way pidgin language, but died before doing so: "a basis for the development of a language between man and dolphin has been established. The continuing work will be directed towards ... inclusion of the trainer as a responding element in the communicating system."

== Personal life ==
Batteau was born in West Rockford, Illinois to Henry Westbrook Batteau and the former Alice Hurst. He enlisted in the Army as a warrant officer in 1942. He married Blanca Delia Matos in 1945 in Orange County, Florida, and they had six children, including the songwriters David Batteau, Robin Batteau and Dwight Jr. He graduated from Harvard in 1948, and was assistant professor of engineering at Harvard in 1954 and 1956. In 1961, when he was vice-president and a director of United Research Inc., he was elected to life membership in the New York Academy of Science. In 1965 he was professor of mechanical engineering at Tufts University. He died of a heart attack while swimming in Honolulu.
