= Megon McDonough =

American singer-songwriter

- Birth name: Megan McDonough
- Born: Crystal Lake, Illinois
- Genres: Folk, country
- Occupation(s): Singer, songwriter
- Instrument: Guitar
- Years active: 1972–present
- Website: megonmegon.com

Megon McDonough (formerly Megan McDonough) is an American folk/cabaret singer-songwriter and actress, from Crystal Lake, Illinois. After her early solo recording career brought national attention, she became a founding member of Four Bitchin' Babes, performing and recording with them from 1990 to 2001 and then resuming her solo work.

McDonough wrote her first song at age 11 and had her first record deal by the time she was 14, securing the deal after winning a local "Big Break" talent contest sponsored by local radio station WLS. The label was Wooden Nickel, and she released four albums between 1972 and 1974. By age 17, she was the opening act for John Denver at Carnegie Hall. She also opened for acts such as Steve Martin and Harry Chapin.

== Career ==
Megon McDonough Worked with Bob Monaco and Barry Fasman and Jim Golden who produced her single, "Guitar Picker". It was released on the Wooden Nickel label. It was one of the Billboard Radio Action Picks for the week of 15 April 1972, and was already seeing action on KEYN in Wichita.

McDonough played Patsy Cline in the musical Always...Patsy Cline. She wrote and performed a one-woman cabaret show, An Interesting Bunch of Gals, in which she pays tribute to eight artists who influenced her, including Édith Piaf, Billie Holiday, and Joni Mitchell.

In 1993, McDonough also played the singing voice for actress Jennie Garth during the performance of the song Timeless Love in the made-for-TV movie Danielle Steel's Star.

== Discography ==
Her first name was spelled "Megan" on her earlier albums, changing to "Megon" with Day by Day.

- In the Megan Manner (privately re-released songs from defunct 1972 Wooden Nickel album # WNS-1004)
- Megan Music (privately re-released songs from defunct 1972 Wooden Nickel album # WNS-1007)
- Keepsake (privately re-released songs from defunct 1973 Wooden Nickel album # BWL1-0145)
- Sketches (privately re-released songs from defunct 1974 Wooden Nickel album # BWL1-0499)
- If I Could Only Reach You (unknown release year – privately released songs from late 1970s pop-country era while playing college campuses and Chicago clubs)
- Day by Day (1989)
- American Girl (1990)
- Blue Star Highway (1993)
- My One and Only Love (1996)
- 4+1 (2002)
- The Patsy Project (2002) (with Don Stiernberg)
- Spirits in the Material World (2006)
