= Nina Gerber =

American guitarist

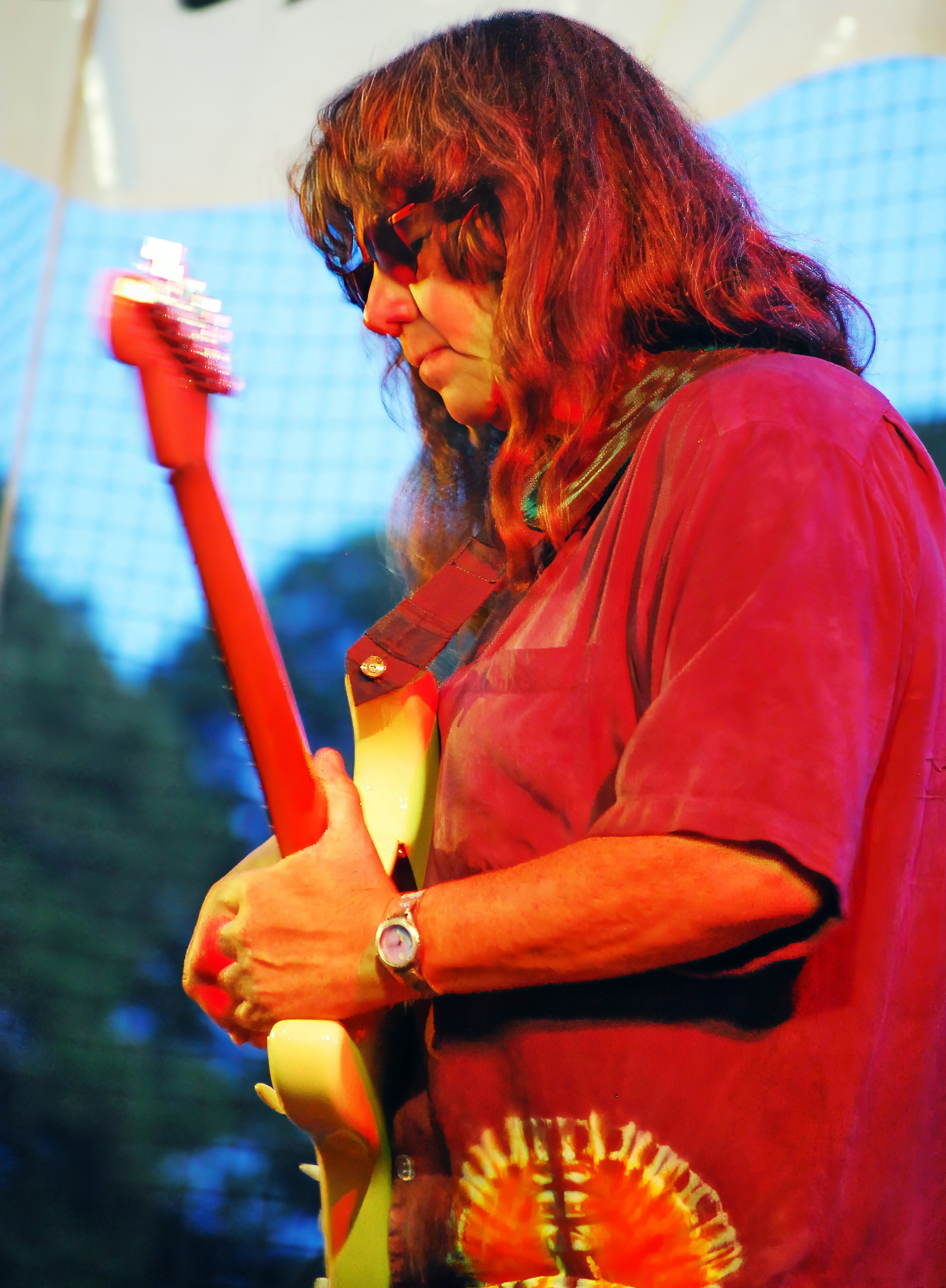
Nina Gerber in 2010

Nina Gerber is an American guitarist and mandolinist who first came to attention when she accompanied singer-songwriter Kate Wolf from 1979 until Wolf's death in 1986.

Gerber was born and raised in Sebastopol, California. In 1975, Gerber was still at high school when she saw Kate Wolf perform at a Sebastopol pizza parlor, and decided she wanted to play with her, which she first achieved in 1978. Gerber has collaborated with many other artists, mostly folk musicians, including Karla Bonoff and songwriter Chris Webster. She released her first album, Not Before Noon, in 2001.

In 1999, Gerber was awarded the Kate Wolf Memorial Award by the World Folk Music Association.

== Solo albums ==
- Not Before Noon (2001)
- Sweet Dreams: Lullabies for Guitar (2003)
- Good Music with Good People (2007)

== Collaborations ==
- Apple Blossom Lane with Chris Webster (2013)
