= Robin Batteau =

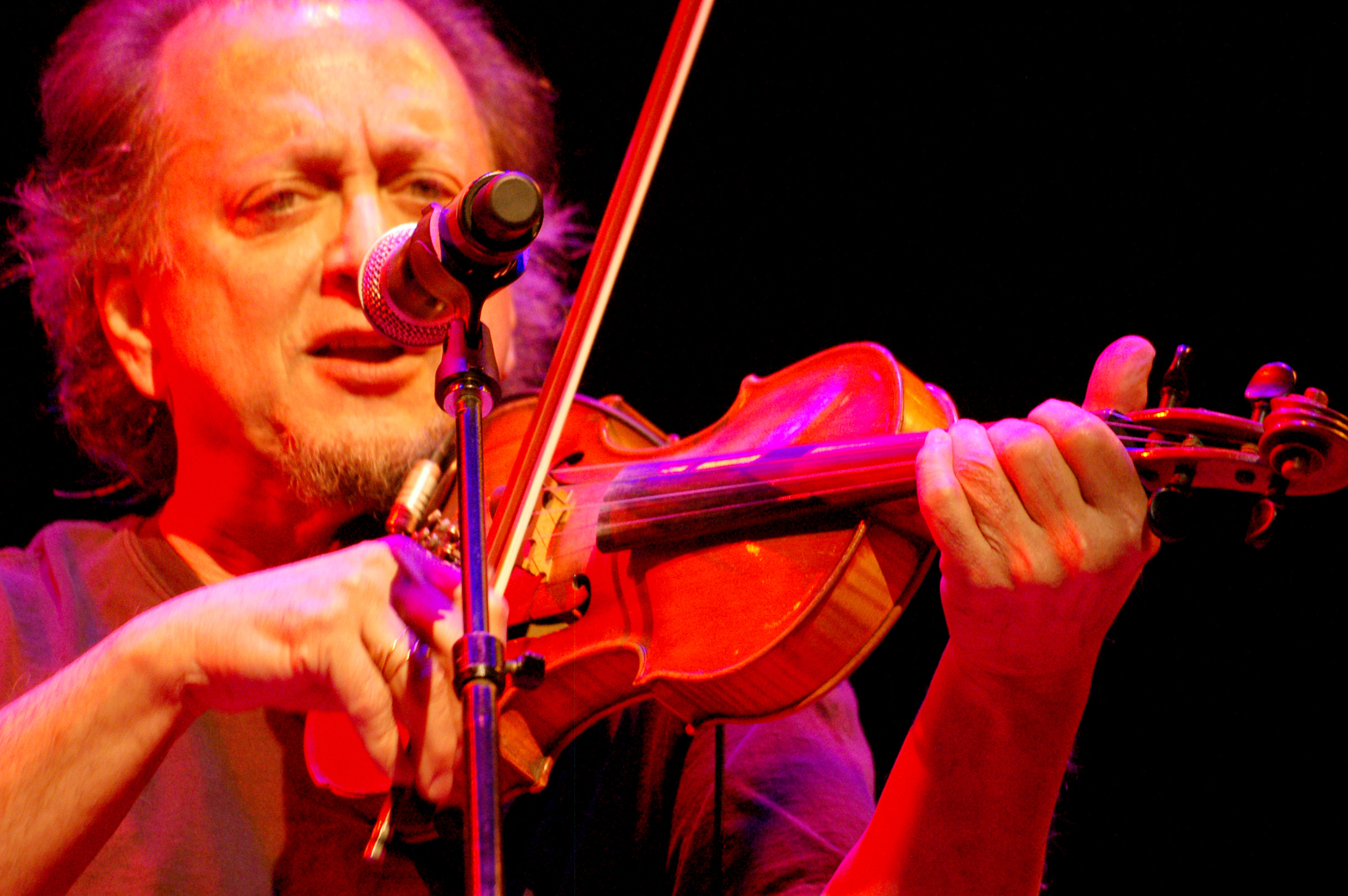
- Batteau in 2014

Background information
- Born: January 12, 1948 (age 78)
- Occupations: Composer, singer-songwriter, music producer

Robin Batteau (born January 12, 1948) is an American composer, singer-songwriter, and music producer.

== Life and career ==
Batteau is the son of Blanca Batteau and Dr. Dwight Wayne Batteau, and brother of singer/songwriter David Batteau. He attended Phillips Academy in Andover and should have graduated from Harvard University in 1969, but actually finished his degree in 2021. Batteau worked with his brother David as Batteaux, releasing one album on Columbia Records in 1971. He performed with David Buskin as Buskin and Batteau but in April 2014 the duo split up. He recorded with Tom Rush. Batteau was awarded the Kate Wolf Memorial Award by the World Folk Music Association in 1991.
