= David Buskin =

American singer

- Born: December 13, 1943 (age 82); New York City, New York, U.S.
- Occupation: Composer/Singer-songwriter
- Known for: Composer of well-recognized jingles and grammy award winning music

Buskin grew up in New York City. He graduated from Brown University in 1965 in the middle of the folk music era. After Brown, he attended Berklee College of Music in Boston, MA where he began to write his own brand of folk-rock songs. His brother is the writer John Buskin.

== Performer ==
Buskin signed his first recording contract with Epic Records in the early 1970s. He recorded two albums in Nashville and later toured with the rock group Pierce Arrow, recording two albums for Columbia Records. Here he met Robin Batteau, and the two decided to become a duo. David played guitar and piano; Robin guitar, mandolin, and electric violin. The partnership lasted until 1990. The Washington Post has described the duo as "an irresistible amalgam of melodic, sensual pop, folkie grit and killer wit." They appeared together, composing and performing throughout New England and New York in various clubs, including The Bottom Line.

David performs with his partners, Rob Carlson and George Wurzbach in the group "Modern Man – filling the void between The Three Tenors and The Three Stooges." "With the release of their third CD, "Assisted Living," the somewhat musical group known as Modern Man continued its assault on the out-moded idea that only those persons not yet manifesting symptoms of Alzheimer's should perform in public."

From 2005 to 2014, Buskin rejoined his former partner, Robin Batteau and percussionist Marshal Rosenberg. They created a new CD and toured as "Folk du Soleil." In April, 2014, Batteau announced his retirement from performing, but reunited with Buskin starting in 2019. From 2014 to 2015, Buskin performed with his partners in "Modern Man," with a final concert in October, 2015.

== Awards ==
Buskin received the Clio award in 1983.

Buskin is the recipient of the "Kate Wolf Award" from the World Folk Music Association in 1999.

In 2002 Modern Man was awarded Backstage's "Bistro Award" for Best Musical."

== Discography ==
- David Buskin (Self-titled) 1972
- He Used to Treat Her by David Buskin 1973
- The Winter Comes/When I Need You Most Of All by David Buskin
- Two on One by David Buskin and Robin Batteau 1990
- Buskin and Batteau by David Buskin and Robin Batteau
- Heaven Is Free Tonight by Dave Buskin 1993
- A Folksinger Earns Every Dime by David Buskin
- On a Winter's Night with Judy Collins
- New Year Live at Symphony Hall by Tom Rush, Fritz Richmond, David Buskin, Robin Batteau and Trevor Veitch
- Wealthy Man: Live at The Bottom Line, NYC by David Buskin & Friends
- Big League Babe - The Christine Lavin Tribute Album Part 2 by Hugh Blumenfeld, David Buskin, Robin Batteau, Patty Larkin, Sally Fingerett 1998
- The Wide Album: Modern Man by David Buskin, Rob Carlson and George Wurzbach, 1999
- Modern imMaturity by David Buskin, Rob Carlson and George Wurzbach
- David Buskin Goes Out On A Limb by David Buskin 2005
- B&B3 by David Buskin and Robin Batteau 2006
- Assisted Living by David Buskin, Rob Carlson and George Wurzbach 2007
- Red Shoes and Golden Hearts by David Buskin and Robin Batteau 2009
