= Dave Rowe (folk singer) =

American folk singer (born 1973)

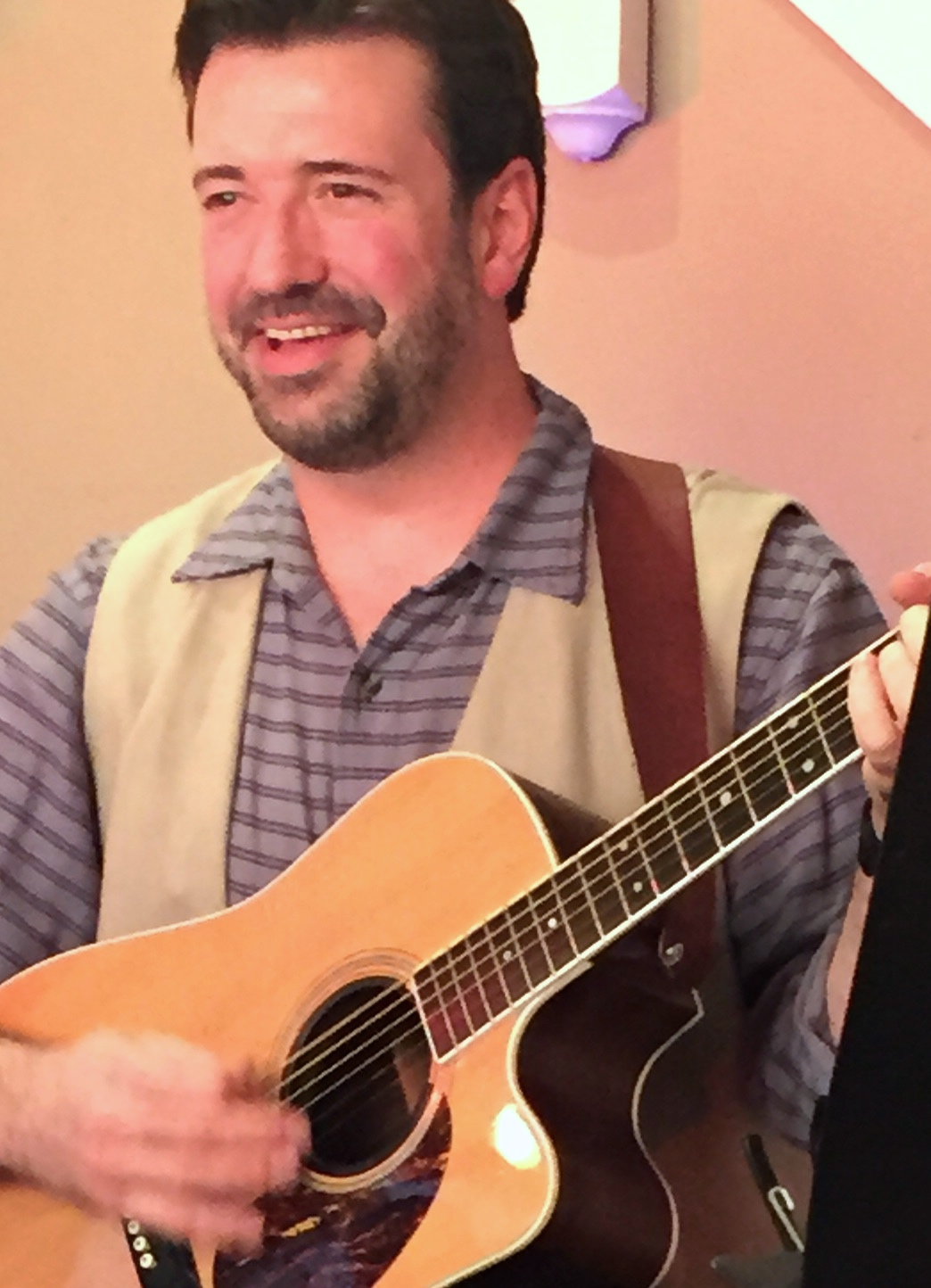

Background information
- Born: David B. Rowe; April 10, 1973; Lewiston, Maine, U.S.
- Genres: Folk, sea shanty, Celtic
- Occupations: Singer, musician
- Instruments: Vocals, bass guitar, guitar, banjo, mandolin, piano, tin whistle
- Years active: 1988 - present
- Label: Outer Green
- Website: www.daverowemusic.com

David B. Rowe (born April 10, 1973), is an American folk singer and musician.

== Early life and education ==
Rowe was born in Lewiston, Maine on April 10, 1973, the only son, one of two children of Tom Rowe and his wife Joanne Demers. He also has three half sisters from his father's second marriage. He is a third generation musician following his father Tom and mother Joanne, an uncle and both grandfathers. Rowe studied musical composition at the Hartt School of Music at the University of Hartford.

== Career ==
Rowe was the first bass player for the Makem Brothers, the sons of famous Irish musician Tommy Makem.

While performing as a guitarist and vocalist with his father Tom Rowe as Rowe by Rowe, they added Denny Breau, brother of Lenny Breau and became Turkey Hollow. Rowe is also Choir Director of the First Universalist Church, Auburn, Maine.

== Discography ==
- Rowe by Rowe (1996)
- Turkey Hollow Consort (1999)
- Live Turkey! (2001)
- By the Way (2002)
- Big Shoes (2004)
- Rolling Home (2005)
- The Good Life (2006)
- A Holiday Concert (2007)
- Three's a Charm (2007)
- The Music Never Dies (2009)
- Greatest Hits (2010)
- 33 1/3 (2011)
- All of the Dreams (2014)
- In Retrospect (2015)
- Live at Baldwin's Station (2016)
