= Schooner Fare =

Folk band

- Origin: Portland, Maine, United States
- Genre: Folk
- Years active: 1975–present
- Label: Outer Green
- Members: Chuck Romanoff; Steve Romanoff
- Past members: Tom Rowe
- Website: outergreen.com

Schooner Fare is a Maine-based folk band, consisting of Steve Romanoff (vocals, six and twelve-string guitar, five-string banjo), Gregory "Chuck" (Note: Chuck is more commonly used in reference to this person than Gregory.) Romanoff (vocals, twelve-string guitar, tenor banjo), and formerly Tom Rowe (vocals, bass guitar, tin whistle). Schooner Fare performs primarily original maritime and traditional folk music as well as original songs of social justice such as "We the People." They perform throughout Maine and North America, and their songs are played by radio stations and satellite radio worldwide.

== Background ==
Tom Rowe and brothers Steve and Chuck Romanoff were born and raised in southern Maine, and all attended the University of Maine. Steve Romanoff is a former humanities professor from the University of Southern Maine. Chuck earned a master's degree in counseling before becoming a social worker and continues to serve on advisory boards. Rowe majored in music, and was a high school band conductor and choral director.

== Career ==
Rowe and the Romanoffs were members of a folk-rock band that Steve co-founded in 1966 that split up because of differences in musical direction. That band, Devonsquare, was founded by Steve and two high school classmates in 1965 and later became a six-piece acoustic band when brother Chuck and others joined.. Tom Rowe joined Devonsquare in 1975 shortly before they broke up. In 1975, Rowe and the Romanoffs founded Schooner Fare. Steve Romanoff says that the group's name refers to "the relation of the price of passage to what's on board to the victuals you eat."

In their early years, Schooner Fare focused on sea songs. Although they broadened their repertoire, their nautical songs have remained popular. Schooner Fare performs both traditional and original songs, sometimes updating the traditional works to more modern versions. Their regional radio hits include "Portland Town" and "Salt Water Farm" which they wrote about Maine's disappearing coastal farms. Schooner Fare's style has been compared to the Limelighters, the Chad Mitchell Trio, and the Journeymen. "Portland Town" remains a regular favorite in Ireland and Canada where other artists perform and record it.

Schooner Fare's first performance was on Maine Public Television in November, 1975. Schooner Fare has performed in Canada and throughout the United States, although their summer appearances have been restricted to Maine. They have done two fan tours to Ireland. They appeared at the Newport Folk Festival, the Calgary Folk Music Festival, The Hudson Clearwater Festival among others. Many of Schooner Fare's annual performances have been fund-raising concerts on behalf of nonprofit organizations. Music critic, Bud Newman, described Schooner Fare as the best folk group in 20 years."The band was described by a critic in The Boston Globe:

Schooner Fare, balancing sturdy, three-part harmonies with standup, three-part comedy proved to be everything the old Kingston Trio should have been but never was: entertaining and infectious, without feeling unduly rote or slick. Or wearing matching shirts.

Schooner Fare released their first album, Day of the Clipper, in 1978. Their album Alive was a live performance in Bath, Maine. Other albums included the 1987 Home for the Holidays, with songs in Hebrew, French, German, and Spanish, and SchoonerKids in 1997 with songs for younger listeners. On their 1989 album, Classic Schooner Fare, the group was accompanied by the Portland Symphony Orchestra, conducted by Dr. Michael Braz who also wrote the orchestral arrangements. The albums And Both Shall Row (2005) and Roots and Wings (2010) were recorded by the Romanoff brothers after Rowe's death. Schooner Fare has its own record label, Outer Green Music Company, established in 1984, which publishes their albums. Steve has published two songbooks of his songs for voice, guitar, and piano.

Rowe, who had throat cancer, died of a heart attack in January, 2004. The Romanoff brothers continued performing as Schooner Fare. The first tribute concert for Tom Rowe took place in Portland on May 8, 2004, and became an annual event.

== Albums ==
- Day of the Clipper - 6/1/1978
- Closer to the Wind - 6/1/1981
- Alive! - 6/1/1983
- We the People - 7/10/1985
- The First Ten Years - 6/1/1986
- Home for the Holidays - 10/1/1987
- Classic Schooner Fare - 6/1/1989
- Signs of Home - 8/1/1990
- For the Times - 6/1/1993
- Finnegan's Wake - 6/2/1995
- Schooner Kids - 6/1/1997
- A 20th Anniversary Party - 6/1/1999
- Our Maine Songs - 6/15/1999
- And Both Shall Row - 10/1/2005
- Roots and Wings - 7/15/2010
