= Christine Lavin =

American singer-songwriter

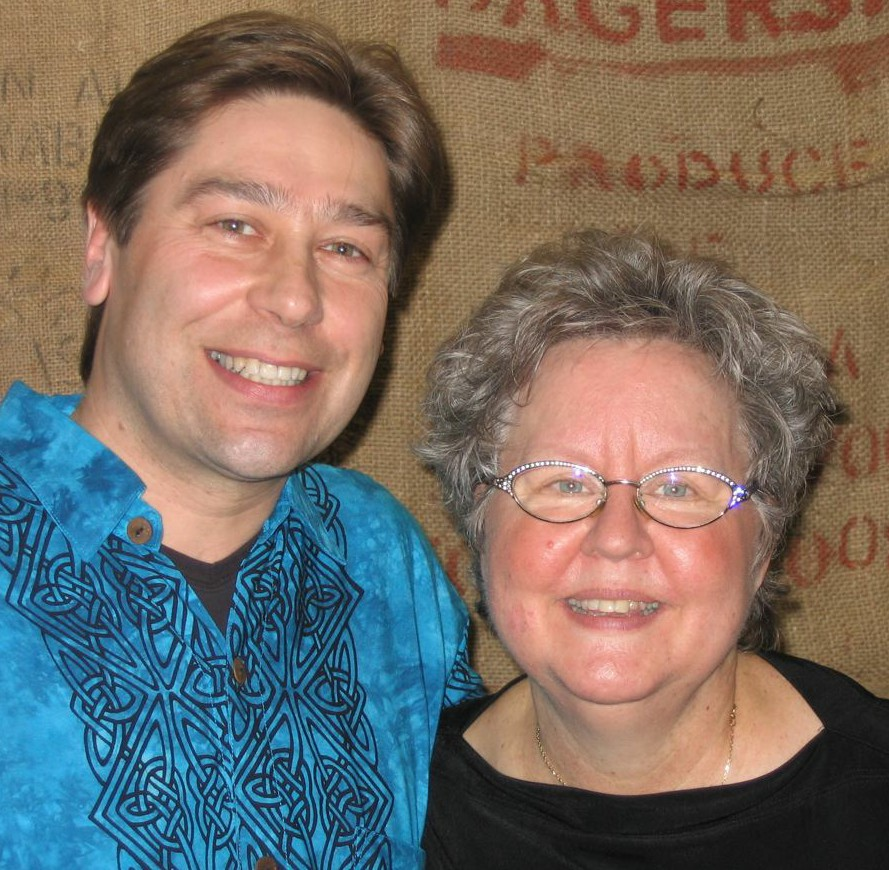
- Lavin with New Jersey coffee entrepreneur and music promoter Ahrre Maros in 2006.

Background information
- Born: January 2, 1952 (age 74)
- Genre: Folk
- Occupations: Singer, songwriter
- Website: christinelavin.com

Christine Lavin (born January 2, 1952) is a New York City–based singer-songwriter and promoter of contemporary folk music. She has recorded numerous solo albums, and has also recorded under the name Four Bitchin' Babes with three bandmates. She is known for her sense of humor, which is expressed in both her music and her onstage performances. Many of her songs alternate between comedy and emotional reflections on romance.

Lavin worked at Caffe Lena in Saratoga Springs, New York, until Dave Van Ronk convinced her to move to New York City and make a career as a singer-songwriter. She followed his advice and accepted his offer of guitar lessons. She was the original host of Sunday Breakfast on WFUV in New York City and a founding member of the Four Bitchin' Babes when they were formed in 1990.

She is a lifelong astrophysics hobbyist and has included those themes in her music.

== Awards ==
- The ASCAP 43rd Annual Deems Taylor Award for her book Cold Pizza For Breakfast: A Mem-Wha??, 2011
- The ASCAP Foundation Jamie deRoy and Friends Award, 2010
- World Folk Music Association Kate Wolf Memorial Award 1990

== Discography ==
- Absolutely Live (1981; re-issued by Winthrop, 2000)
- Future Fossils (Philo, 1984)
- Beau Woes and Other Problems of Modern Life (Philo, 1986)
- Another Woman's Man (Philo, 1987)
- Good Thing He Can't Read My Mind (Philo, 1988)
- Attainable Love (Philo, 1990)
- Compass (Philo, 1991)
- Live at the Cactus Cafe: What Was I Thinking? (Philo, 1993)
- Please Don't Make Me Too Happy (Shanachie, 1995)
- Shining My Flashlight on the Moon (Shanachie, 1997)
- One Wild Night in Concert (1998)
- Getting in Touch With My Inner Bitch (Christine Lavin, 1999)
- The Bellevue Years (Philo, 2000)
- The Subway Series (Christine Lavin, 2001)
- Final Exam (2001)
- I Was in Love With a Difficult Man (Redwing, 2002)
- The Runaway Christmas Tree (2003)
- Sometimes Mother Really Does Know Best [Live] (Appleseed, 2004)
- folkZinger (Appleseed, 2005)
- One Meat Ball (Appleseed, 2006)
- The Runaway Christmas Tree (Appleseed, 2006)
- Happydance of the Xenophobe (2007)
- I Don't Make This Stuff Up, I Just Make It Rhyme (2008)
- Cold Pizza for Breakfast (Yellow Tail Records, 2009)
- If You're Drunk You Cannot Buy A Puppy (Christine Lavin, 2014)
- Spaghettification (Christine Lavin, 2017)
- On My Way To Hooterville (2020)
