= Eugene J. Gibbs =

American architect

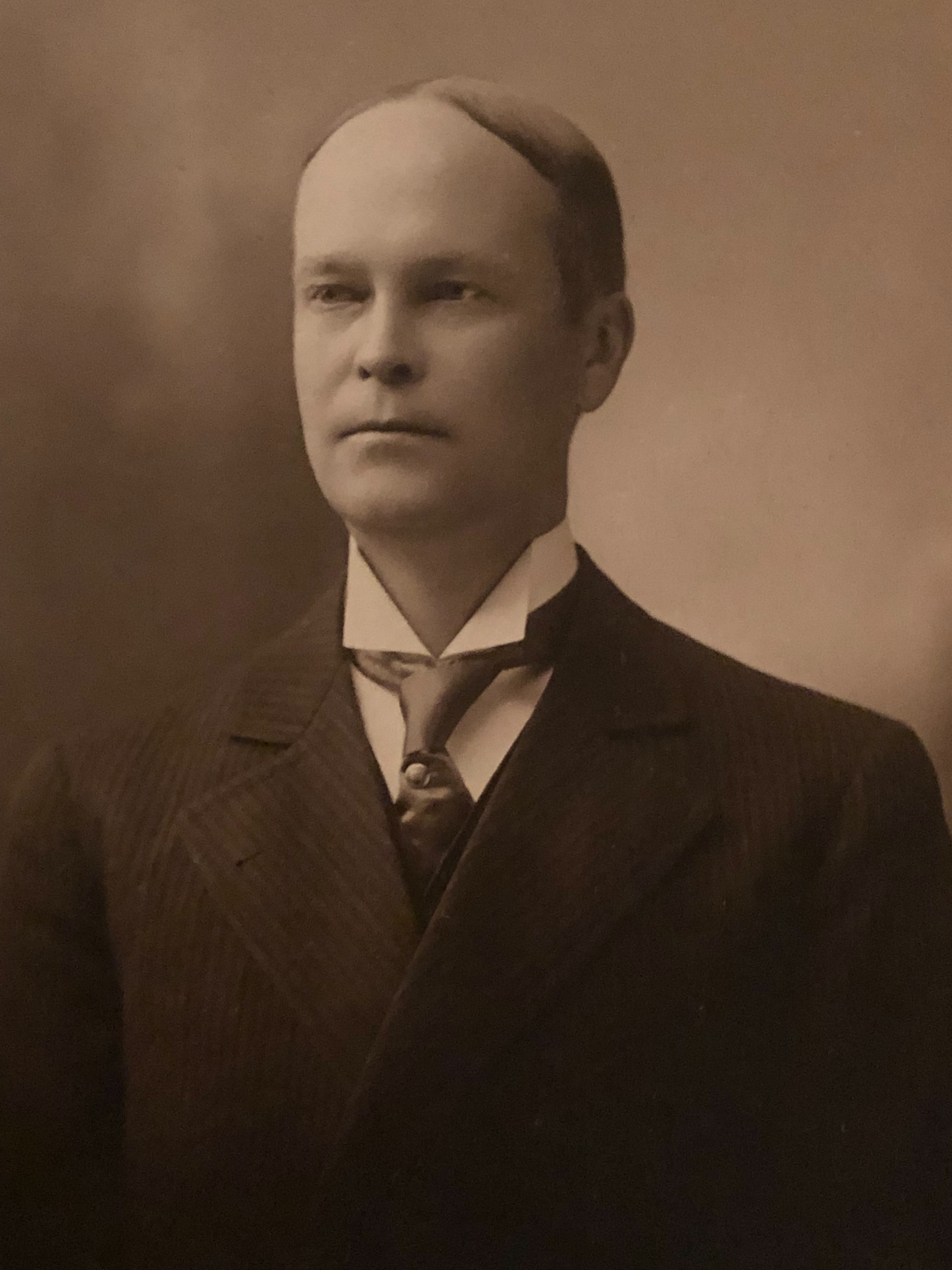
- Eugene J. Gibbs in early life
- Born: 1869; Lewiston, Maine, US
- Died: March 19, 1929; Auburn, Maine, US
- Occupation: Architect

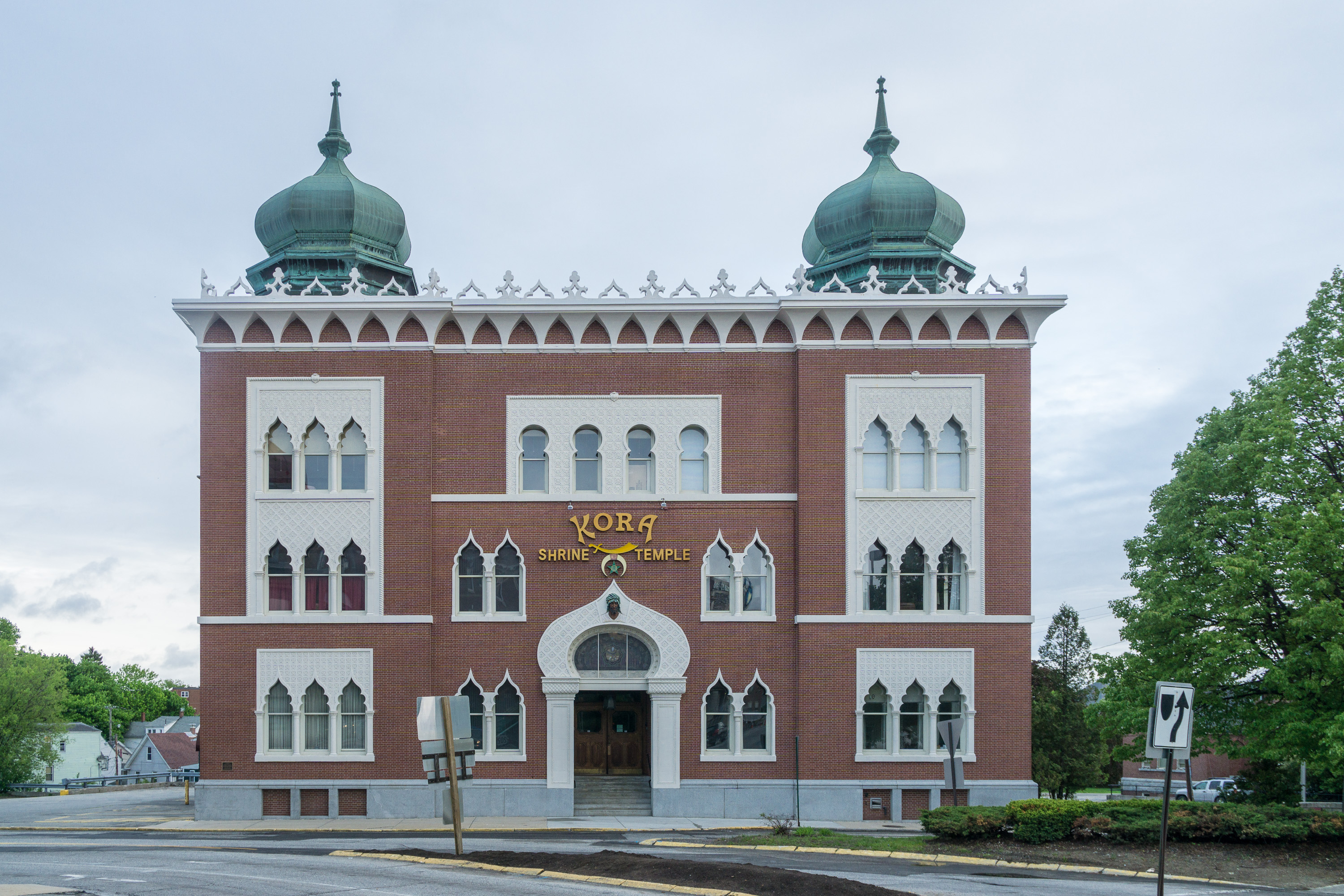
Kora Temple in Lewiston, completed in 1908.

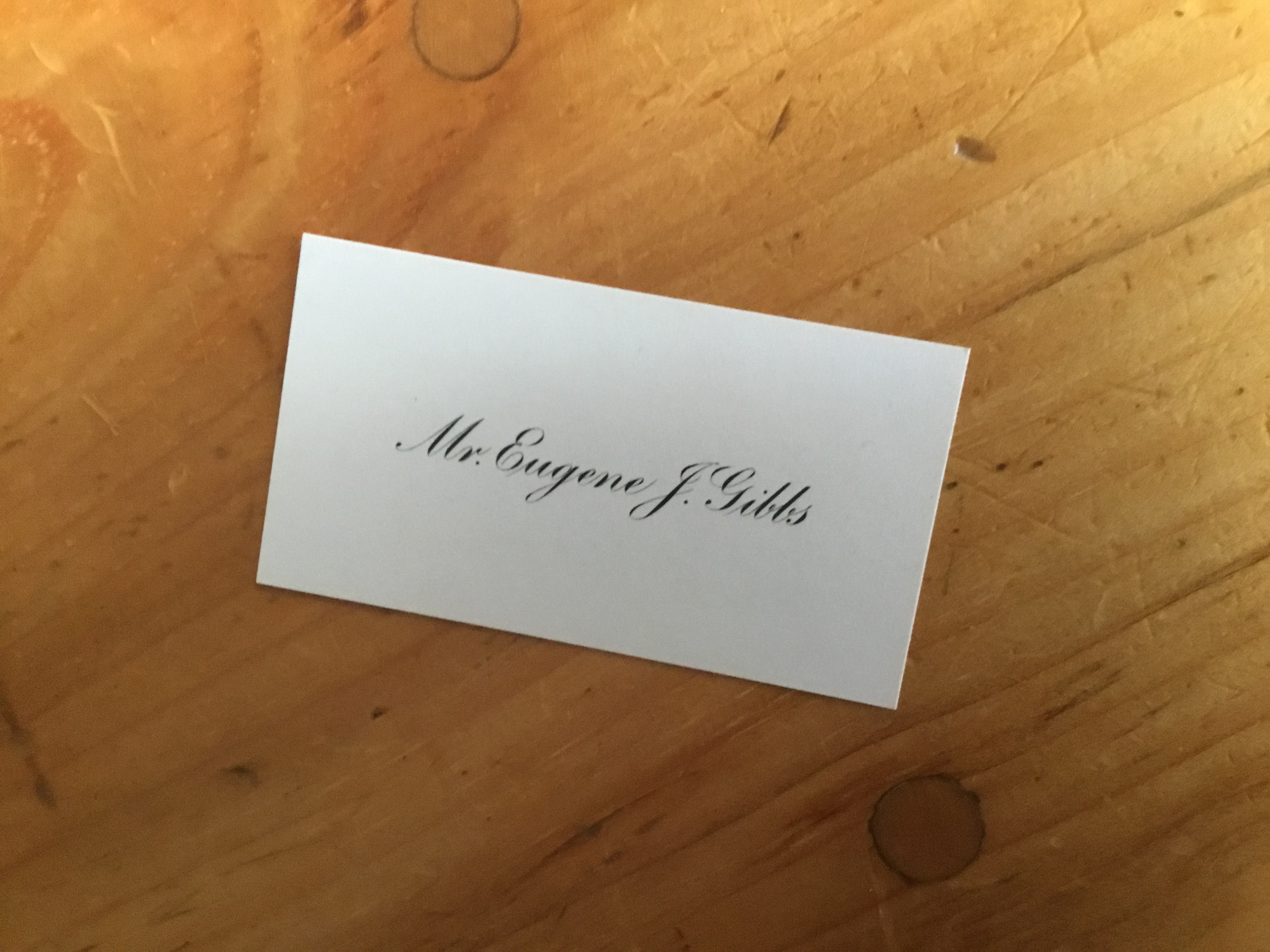
Eugene J. Gibbs personal card.

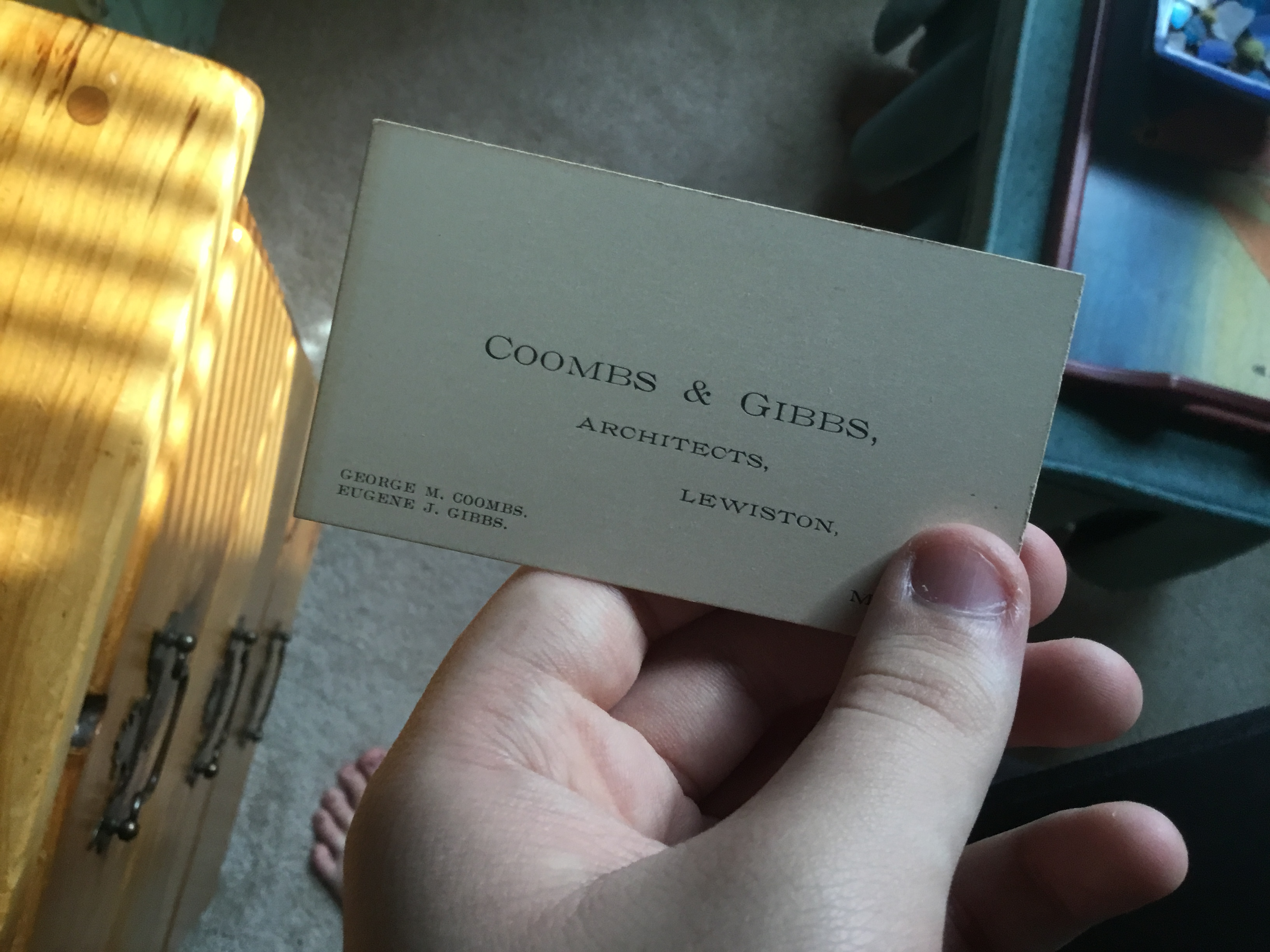
Coombs and Gibbs business card.

Eugene J. Gibbs (1869–1929) was an American architect in practice in Lewiston, Maine, from 1896 to 1929.

== Life and career ==
Eugene J. Gibbs was born in 1869 in Lewiston to John K. Gibbs and his wife. He was raised and educated in Auburn. He was trained in architecture in the office of George M. Coombs, the leading architect in the region. In 1896 he became a partner of Coombs, in a firm variously known as Coombs, Gibbs & Wilkinson and Coombs & Gibbs. Coombs died in 1909, and Gibbs briefly continued in partnership with his son, Harry S. Coombs, who had worked with them since 1901. In 1910 Gibbs left Coombs and formed the firm of Gibbs & Pulsifer with Addison G. Pulsifer, a former employee of Coombs & Gibbs. They dissolved their partnership in 1927, and Gibbs entered private practice. He died suddenly of a stroke on March 19, 1929, at his home in Auburn.

== Personal life ==
Gibbs was married to Grace Furbush, and they had three children. He was also an artist, having two known sketchbooks among his family.

== Legacy ==
At least ten buildings designed by Gibbs and his partners have been listed on the United States National Register of Historic Places, and others contribute to listed historic districts.

The work of which Gibbs was most proud was the Kora Temple in Lewiston, completed in 1908, which he designed in association with Coombs.

== Architectural works ==
=== Coombs, Gibbs & Wilkinson, 1896–1900 ===
- Peck's Dept. Store, 184 Main St., Lewiston, ME (1896)
- James A. Walsh House, 253 Pine St., Lewiston, ME (1896)
- Joseph Holman House, 227 Main St., Farmington, ME (1897)
- Merrill Hall, Farmington State Normal School, Farmington ME (1897–98)
- Lewiston Trust and Safe Deposit Building, 46 Lisbon St., Lewiston, ME (1898)
- Bank Building, 38 Main St., Livermore Falls, ME (1899–1900)

=== Coombs & Gibbs, 1900–1910 ===
- John D. Clifford House, 460 Main St., Lewiston, ME (1900)
- Mt. Kineo House (Remodeling) and Cottages, Northwest Piscataquis, ME (1900) – Hotel demolished.
- Masonic (Gateway) Building, 11 Lisbon St., Lewiston, ME (1901–02)
- George Bonnallie House, 485 Main St., Lewiston, ME (1902)
- Lewiston Public Library, Park & Pine Sts. Lewiston, ME (1902)
- First National Bank Building, 157 Main St., Lewiston, ME (1903)
- Fort Fairfield High School, Main & School Sts., Fort Fairfield, ME (1903) – Demolished.
- Maine Trust and Banking Co. Building, 192 Water St., Gardiner, ME (1903) – Altered.
- First National Bank Building, 18 Market Sq., Houlton, ME (1907)
- Kennebec County Courthouse Annex, 95 State St., Augusta, ME (1907)
- Philo Reed House, Main St., Fort Fairfield, ME (1907)
- Wallace H. White House, 449 Main St., Lewiston, ME (1907)
- Kora Temple, 11 Sabattus St., Lewiston, ME (1908–10)
- Clifford Building, 217 Main St., Lewiston, ME (1909)
- Gray and Staples Halls, Maine School for the Feeble-Minded, New Gloucester, ME (1909)
- Norway Grange No. 45, 15 Whitman St., Norway, ME (1909)
- Callahan Block, 282 Lisbon St., Lewiston, ME (1910)
- Main Building, Central Maine General Hospital, Lewiston, ME (1910)

=== Gibbs & Pulsifer, 1910–1927 ===
- 1913 – Ashe, Noyes & Small Factory (Addition), 71 Spring St, Auburn, Maine
- 1913 – Eastport Primary School, Boynton St, Eastport, Maine
- 1913 – Kimball Hall, Washington State Normal School, Machias, Maine
  - Deteriorating and may be demolished
- 1914 – Horatio G. Foss House, 19 Elm St, Auburn, Maine
- 1916 – Frank M. Coffey House, 25 Webster St, Lewiston, Maine
- 1916 – Ralph W. Crockett House, 443 Main St, Lewiston, Maine
- 1918 – Daniel J. McGillicuddy Apartments, 84 Lisbon St, Lewiston, Maine
- 1919 – Androscoggin Electric Building, 134 Main St, Lewiston, Maine
- 1921 – Frank M. Coffey Apartments, 14 Leeds St, Lewiston, Maine
- 1921 – Nurses' Home, Central Maine General Hospital, Hammond St, Lewiston, Maine
- 1922 – Association Building, 1719 Main St, South Paris, Maine
- 1923 – Ss. Cyril and Methodius Church, 51 Main St, Lisbon Falls, Maine
- 1925 – Arthur L. Mann Memorial Library, 226 Main St, West Paris, Maine
- 1926 – John D. Clifford House, 14 Ware St, Lewiston, Maine
