= Addison G. Pulsifer =

American architect

- Born: Addison Gilbert Pulsifer; December 11, 1874; Auburn, Maine, US
- Died: January 4, 1945 (aged 71); Auburn, Maine, US
- Occupation: Architect
- Practice: Gibbs & Pulsifer; Pulsifer & Eye

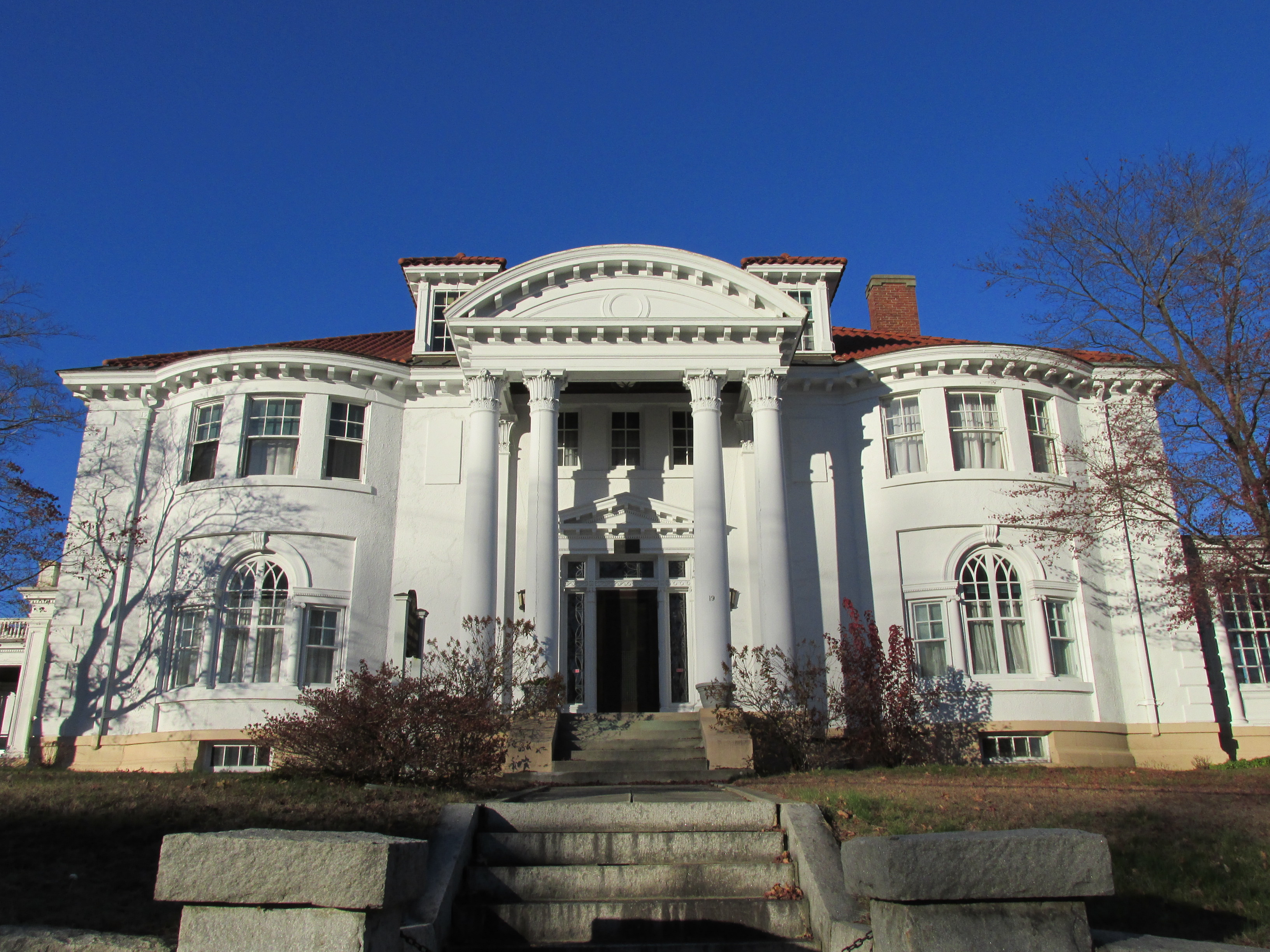
The Horatio G. Foss house in Auburn, built in 1914.

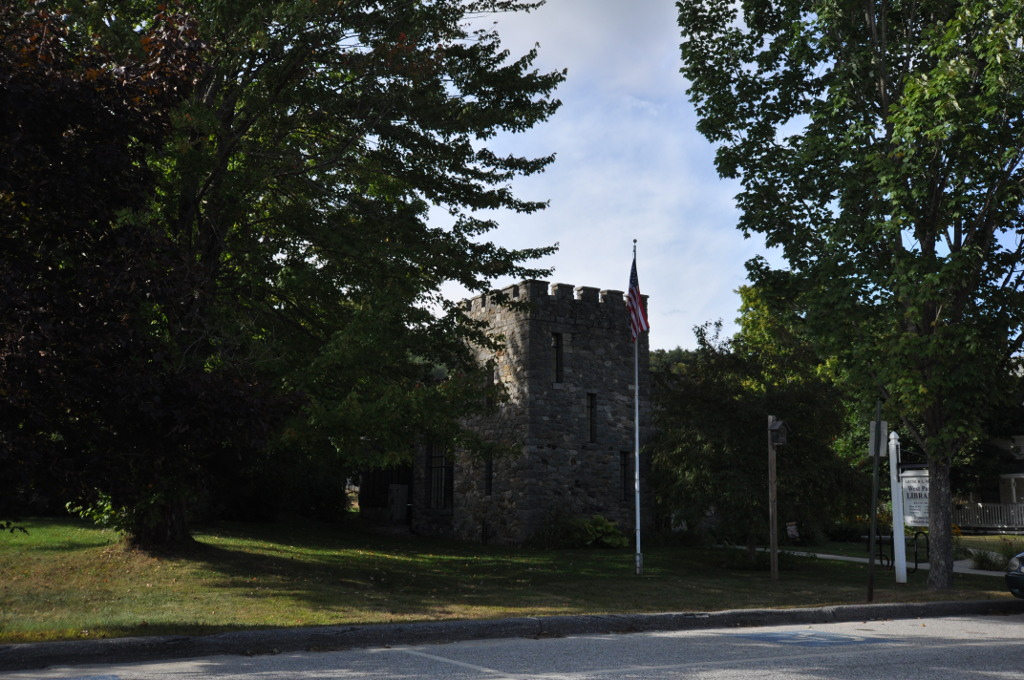
The Mann Memorial Library in West Paris, completed in 1926.

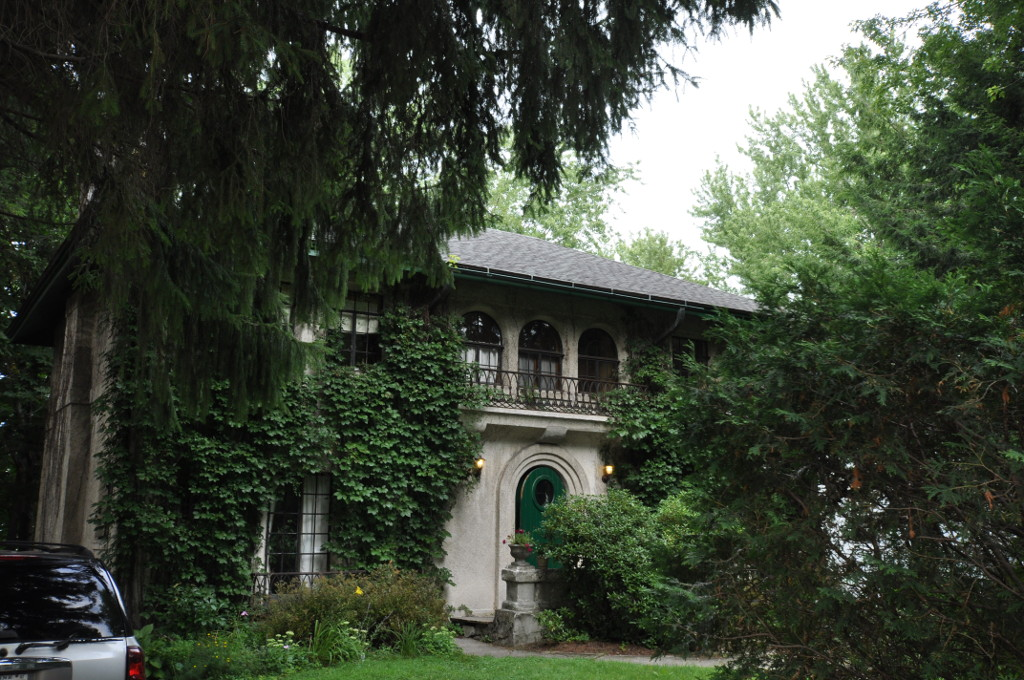
The John D. Clifford house in Lewiston, built in 1926.

Addison Gilbert Pulsifer (December 11, 1874 – January 4, 1945) was an American architect practicing in Lewiston, Maine.

== Life and career ==
Pulsifer was born in 1874 in Auburn, Maine, to Haley A. Pulsifer and Lenora A. (Perno) Pulsifer. He was educated in the Auburn public schools, graduating from Edward Little High School in 1896. He then joined the office of Coombs, Gibbs & Wilkinson, Lewiston architects. After ten years he went to Worcester, Massachusetts, where he worked for architects Frost, Briggs & Chamberlain and contractors Norcross Brothers. In 1910 his former employer, Eugene J. Gibbs, called him back to Lewiston, where they formed the partnership of Gibbs & Pulsifer. Gibbs retired in 1927, and Pulsifer formed the new firm of Pulsifer & Eye with Harold M. Eye. They dissolved their partnership in the mid-30s, after which Pulsifer practiced independently in Lewiston.

== Personal life ==
Pulsifer was married in 1901 to Mildred M. Lyceth of Auburn, and they had one son. He lived in Auburn.

== Legacy ==
At least four buildings designed by Pulsifer and his partners have been listed on the United States National Register of Historic Places, and others contribute to listed historic districts.

== Architectural works ==
- Eastport Primary School, Boynton St, Eastport, Maine (1913)
- Kimball Hall, Washington State Normal School, Machias, Maine (1913, demolished)
- Horatio G. Foss house, (Note: A contributing property to the Main Street Historic District, NRHP-listed in 1989.) 19 Elm St, Auburn, Maine (1914, NRHP 1976)
- Frank M. Coffey house, 25 Webster St, Lewiston, Maine (1916)
- Ralph W. Crockett house, (Note: A contributing property to the Main Street–Frye Street Historic District, NRHP-listed in 2009.) 443 Main St, Lewiston, Maine (1916)
- Daniel J. McGillicuddy apartments, 84 Lisbon St, Lewiston, Maine (1918)
- Androscoggin Electric Company Building, 134 Main St, Lewiston, Maine (1919)
- Nurses' Home, Central Maine Medical Center, Hammond St, Lewiston, Maine (1921)
- Association Building, 1719 Main St, South Paris, Maine (1922)
- St. Cyril and St. Methodius Church, 51 Main St, Lisbon Falls, Maine (1923–26, NRHP 1977)
- Arthur L. Mann Memorial Library, 226 Main St, West Paris, Maine (1925–26, NRHP 1988)
- John D. Clifford house, 14 Ware St, Lewiston, Maine (1926, NRHP 1987)
- Wade & Dunton Motors Building, 10 Oak St, Lewiston, Maine (1929)
- Morse Memorial School, 27 School St, Brooks, Maine (1931)
- Singer Building, 177 Main St, Lewiston, Maine (1934)
