= Edward Little =

Edward Little may refer to:

- Edward Little (rugby union) (1864–1945), Scottish-born South African rugby union player
- Edward Little (1897–1970), British band leader, better known as Edward Lexy
- Edward Little (philanthropist) (1773–1849), founder of Edward Little High School in Maine, US
- Edward Alfred Little (1859–1934), Ontario farmer and political figure
- Edward C. Little (1858–1924), US representative from Kansas
- Edward P. Little (1791–1875), US representative from Massachusetts
- Edward S. Little (1918–2004), American diplomat
- Edward S. Little II (born 1947), bishop of the Episcopal Diocese of Northern Indiana
- Eddie Little (1954–2003), American writer
- Edward Little (Royal Navy officer) (1811–c. 1848), British royal navy officer

== Buildings ==
- Edward Little High School in Maine
- Edward Little House in Maine
