= Oxford Hills Comprehensive High School =

Public high school in Maine, United States

Location
- 256 Main Street; South Paris, Maine 04281; Oxford Hills; United States; 44°12′42″N 70°31′38″W

Information
- Other name: OHCHS (acronym)
- Former name: Oxford Hills High School
- Type: Public high school
- Motto: "Aude Suscipere Ausum" ("Dare to Accept the Challenge")
- Established: 1961
- School board: Maine Department of Education
- School district: Maine School Administrative District 17 (MSAD 17)
- NCES School ID: 231077000361
- Principal: Paul Bickford
- Faculty: Tara Pelletier (assistant principal); Kayla McGee (assistant principal); Alicia Sadler (Dean of Students); Randolph Crockett (OHTS director)
- Teaching staff: 105.75 (on an FTE basis)(2021-2022)
- Grades: 9-12
- Age: 14 to 20
- Enrollment: 1,091 (2021-2022)
- Student to teacher ratio: 13.85:1 (2021-2022)
- Language: English
- Colors: Green and gold
- Athletics conference: Class AA (Maine Tier 1)
- Mascot: Viking
- Team name: Vikings
- USNWR ranking: 55-113 (Maine) (2021-2022); 13,383-17,843 (United States) (2021-2022)
- Website: www.msad17.org/o/oxford-hills-high-school

The Oxford Hills Comprehensive High School (OHCHS) is a public high school in South Paris, Maine, a census-designated place (CDP) located within the town of Paris in Oxford County, Maine, United States. Part of the Oxford Hills School District (MSAD 17), the school serves the towns of Paris, Oxford, Norway, West Paris, Waterford, Hebron, Harrison and Otisfield.

== History ==
Oxford Hills High School was founded in 1961 as part of a consolidation plan statewide for small schools. It combined Norway High School and Paris High School, then crosstown rivals. The school operated in the previous school buildings until 1966–67, when a new school was built nearby. In 1998, the school integrated local technical classes and the core curriculum, creating the current institution.

Oxford Hills is also the home of the original Project Graduation. A graduation event started in 1980 after seven instances of alcohol and drug-related deaths after the 1979 graduation.

In 1998, Oxford Hills' school district, MSAD 17, became part of the Oxford Hills Higher Educational Initiative.

== Notable alumni ==
Joe Perham, comedian
