= Jacob Immonen =

American politician

Jacob J. Immonen (January 13, 1908-April 1999) was an American Republican politician from West Paris, Maine. He served in the Maine House of Representatives from 1967 to 1980. He also served on the school board and as a town selectman. In April 1999, Immonen died at the age of 91. A Joint Resolution was passed later that month memorializing the longtime legislator.
