= Arthur L. Mann Memorial Library =

- U.S. National Register of Historic Places
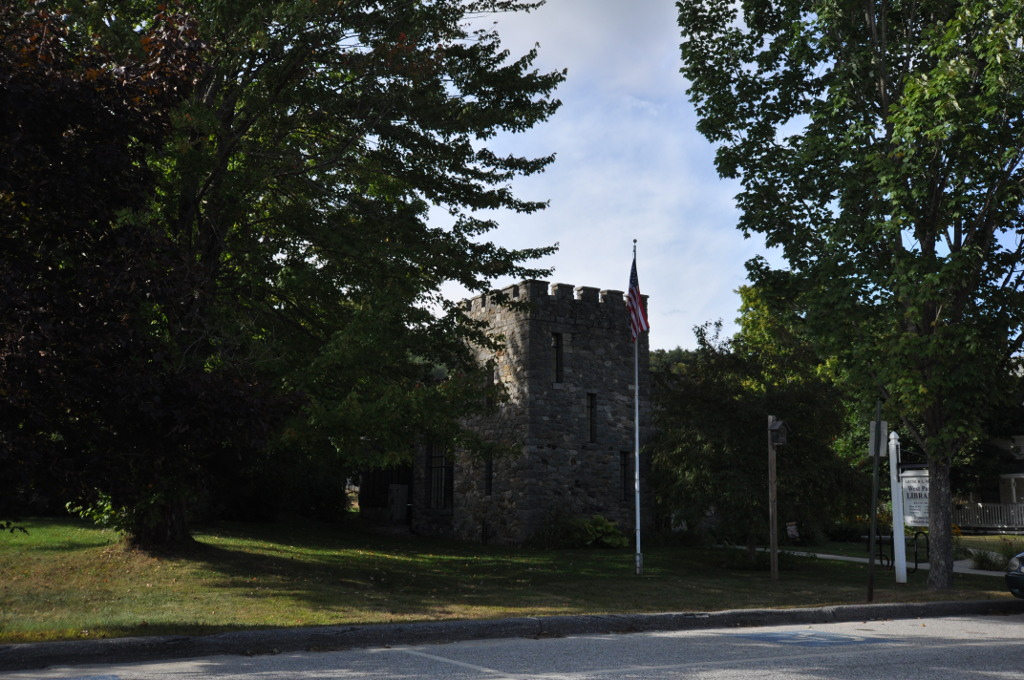

- Location within Maine Location within the United States
- Location: Main St., West Paris, Maine
- Coordinates: 44°19′30″N 70°34′27″W
- Area: less than one acre
- Built: 1926
- Architect: Gibbs & Pulsifer
- Architectural style: Late 19th And 20th Century Revivals
- MPS: Maine Public Libraries MPS
- NRHP reference No.: 88003016
- Added to NRHP: January 5, 1989

The Arthur L. Mann Memorial Library is the public library of West Paris, Maine. It is located in Main Street in the town center, in a building that resembles a small castle. The architecturally distinctive building was designed by the Lewiston firm of Gibbs & Pulsifer, and was built in 1926 as a gift from Lewis Mann in honor of his son Arthur. It was listed on the National Register of Historic Places in 1989.

== Architecture and library history ==
The library building is a fieldstone structure, roughly divided into three sections. The most prominent section is the crenellated tower, which projects forward and left of the bulk of the building, and has three narrow casement windows on the front, staggered in height. To its right, in the center of the main facade, is an arched entrance bay, topped by an elevated parapet with crenellations and flanked on the right by a narrow casement window and a buttress. To the far right is a section lower in height, also topped with crenellations, dominated by a large many-paned window.

The interior has a fairly conventional library layout, with a central circulation desk, a reading room to the right, and stacks to the left. The tower houses a sitting area, and does not have (despite the appearance of the external windows) a stairwell.

The origins of the West Paris Library are in a private subscription library founded in 1889, a model used by many small communities in Maine at the time. This association received municipal funds in 1925, becoming a free library. In these years it was housed in a variety of locations. Lewis Mann, a longtime West Paris resident, bequested land and funds (the latter matched by his son Edwin) for this building, which was completed in 1926. It was one of a series of library commissions executed by the Lewiston firm of Gibbs & Pulsifer, which included the public libraries of Lewiston and Dover-Foxcroft.

== See also ==
- National Register of Historic Places listings in Oxford County, Maine
