= Project Graduation =

American high school program

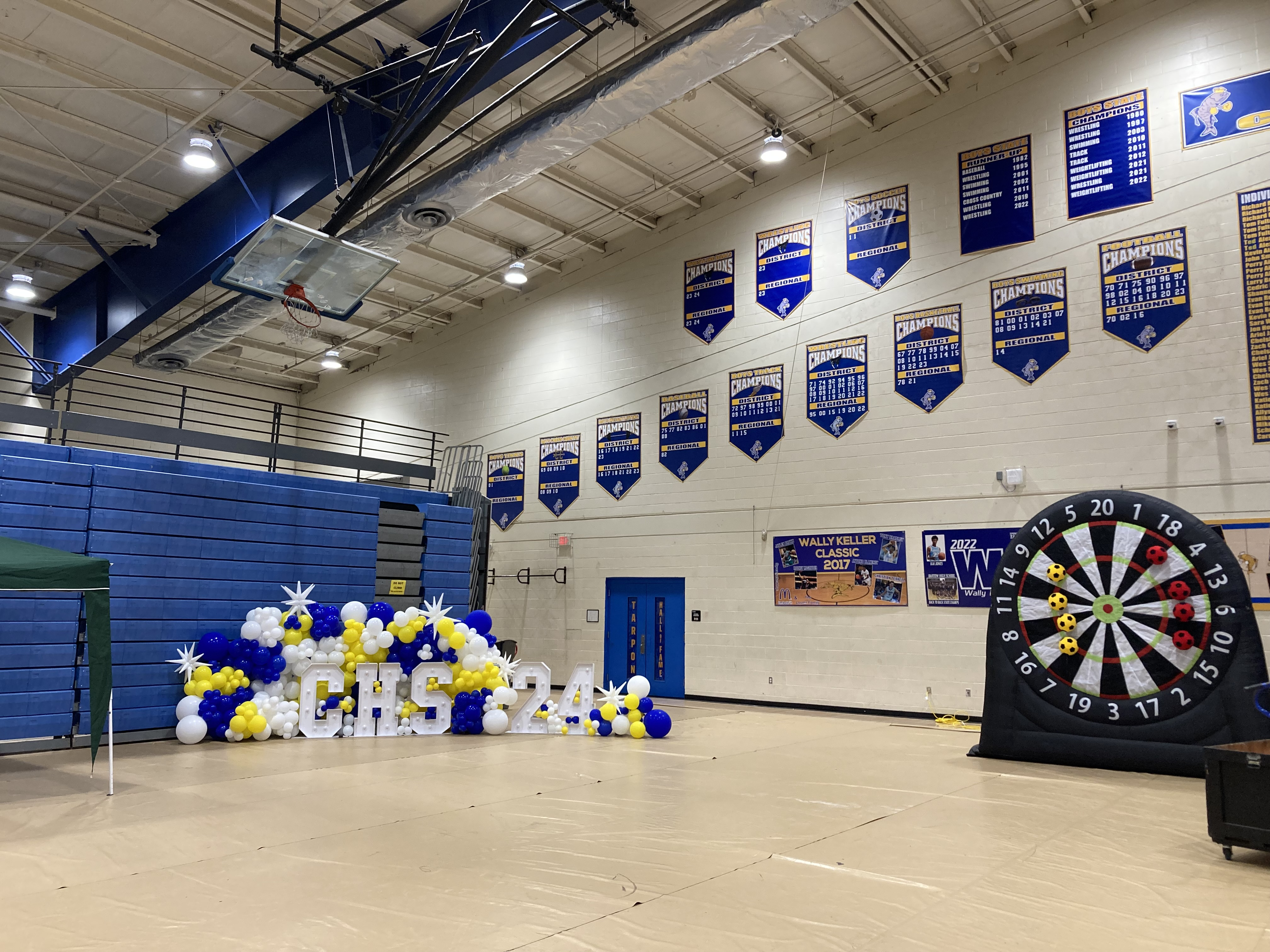
Gymnasium at Charlotte High School in Punta Gorda, Florida being prepared for Project Graduation

Project Graduation is a program offered by many high schools in the United States, in which organized, adult-supervised and alcohol-free activities are offered as part of a post-graduation party, as an alternative to student-run events involving alcoholic beverages or drugs. Events often last through the night and are held in hotels or community centers. Students are checked for illicit substances before entry and are carefully monitored.

In 1989, the federal government provided aid to states across the country that was allocated to schools within the state. 38 schools in New Jersey received $1,500 in seed money to establish non-alcohol graduation night programs.

== History ==
Project Graduation emerged in the Oxford Hills area (Paris/Norway) of Maine, in 1980, the result of community energies empowered through a state initiative. It has long since been recognized as a prototype for the nation, helping to protect the lives of graduating seniors in all states.

Beginning in 1978, an Alcohol, Other Drugs and Highway Safety Prevention/Intervention Program was initiated by the Division of Alcohol and Drug Education Services, within Maine's Department of Education, designed in cooperation with the Bureau of Safety. The thrust of program was to help schools and communities locally address problems associated with alcohol and other drugs.

Oxford Hills and five other communities sent teams of school and community leaders through intensive training sponsored by the division. After an 11-day, live-in program of initial training and then follow-up instruction, these teams were prepared to implement an action plan to develop comprehensive alcohol and other drug prevention and education programs in their home communities.

One of these teams, the Drug and Alcohol Team of Oxford Hills (DATOH), aimed to prevent recurring tragedies as Oxford Hills had experienced the previous year (1979), when seven alcohol and other drug related teen deaths occurred during the commencement season.

Led by DATOH, area schools and communities provided the Class of 1980 at Oxford Hills High School with information about the risks of drinking, drugging and driving. The seniors were offered an alternative to the "traditional" graduation-night drinking event that drew hundreds of people to the local fair grounds. They called this chemical-free party "Project Graduation." The entire process, a huge success, was covered by the news media and was adopted as a major program initiative of the Division of Alcohol and Drug Education Services.

Through the work of the division and Maine's communications media, other schools and communities became involved in Project Graduation the following year. In 1981 there were 12 Project Graduation sites, and the following year, 36 sites with a consistent decline in alcohol-related teen highway deaths. This decline reached zero fatalities in 1983 when there were 86 sites involved. In 1986, there were 139 sites, or 98 percent, of Maine's high schools. Project Graduation activities were attended by 80 percent of the Class of 1986. In 1987, 139 schools, or 94% participated in Project Graduation with 80% of the seniors attending.

Project Graduation captured the imaginations of more than Maine seniors. In 1983, the project was one of eight national models selected by the U.S. Department of Health and Human Services to be presented at a conference held in Washington, D.C. At this conference, Project Graduation was identified as a concrete model - a practical springboard that can lead to other prevention activities.

As a result of that conference, many states began to explore the possibility of replicating the project. Florida Informed Parents, Inc. and "Texan's War on Drugs" led the way in their states with support from Maine . Iowa became involved through the leadership of Dr. John Artis, former Skowhegan Area High School Principal.

In 1984, the division consulted with the National Highway Traffic Safety Administration (NHTSA) in the preparation of an agenda, learning materials, and a program for a National Project Graduation Conference. The conference was held in Springfield, Illinois in March, 1984. Thirty-eight states sent delegations of two students and one adult. Eleven Maine presenters shared their concepts of Project Graduation. Project Graduation: Friends for Life, a booklet highlighting the essential ingredients of the project, was prepared by NHTSA in consultation with the division for that conference. Nineteen states had state-wide Project Graduation Coordinators. In 1986, Project Graduation was held in all 50 states and two Canadian provinces. The project received national attention in 1987 in Good Housekeeping magazine and again in 1989 in Woman's Day magazine.

In 1990, there were no youth fatalities attributed to drinking, drugging, and driving in Maine during the May 15-June 20 commencement season. It was the third consecutive year there were no Maine youth highway fatalities during this critical period. Recognition of Project Graduation's impact continued. More than 40 states had Project Graduation contact persons.

The primary aims of Project Graduation activities are to increase awareness of the dangers of drinking, drugging and driving and to reduce the number of youth involved in alcohol and other drug-related highway crashes. Across the country, Project Graduation and the chemical-free celebrations it inspired are the new tradition for graduating seniors. In Perspectives in Disease Prevention and Health Promotion Project Graduation- Maine, the Centers for Disease Control and Prevention observed that "Project Graduation has become much more than an event that occurs on graduation night. It is a communitywide planning process that strives to create a caring, supportive environment and more open communication between youths and adults."

All school-related functions are supposed to be chemical-free, but what makes Project Graduation different is the attitude of the students. They have made a conscious decision to enjoy their graduation night without alcohol or other drugs. And no other group, including parents and school personnel, can make that decision for students.
