= Graveyard Shift (1990 film) =

1990 film by Ralph S. Singleton

- Theatrical release poster
- Directed by: Ralph S. Singleton
- Screenplay by: John Esposito
- Based on: "Graveyard Shift" by Stephen King
- Produced by: William J. Dunn; Ralph S. Singleton
- Starring: David Andrews; Kelly Wolf; Stephen Macht; Brad Dourif
- Cinematography: Peter Stein
- Edited by: Jim Gross; Randy Jon Morgan
- Music by: Brian Banks; Anthony Marinelli
- Production companies: Sugar Entertainment, Inc. Graveyard, Inc.
- Distributed by: Paramount Pictures
- Release date: October 26, 1990
- Running time: 86 minutes
- Country: United States
- Language: English
- Budget: $10.5 million
- Box office: $11.6 million

Graveyard Shift (also known as Stephen King's Graveyard Shift) is a 1990 American horror film directed by Ralph S. Singleton, written by John Esposito, starring David Andrews, Stephen Macht, Kelly Wolf, and Brad Dourif, and based on the 1970 short story of the same name by Stephen King which was first published in the October 1970 issue of Cavalier magazine, and later collected in King's 1978 collection Night Shift.

Graveyard Shift was released on October 26, 1990. The film received negative reviews from critics.

== Plot ==
Widowed drifter John Hall is hired to work in an old rat-infested textile mill next to an abandoned graveyard by the sadistic mill foreman, Warwick. Warwick has been carrying on numerous affairs with female workers, the latest being Nordello. Warwick has hired eccentric rat exterminator Tucker Cleveland to take care of the rat problem. Cleveland confides in Hall that he is unable to kill all of the rats and the mill should be shut down. In the following weeks, Hall is childishly harassed by his fellow workers Danson, Brogan, and Stevenson. Warwick holds a special hatred for him, as Hall isn't intimidated by him, and Hall also stepped in and prevented Warwick from hitting on Nordello. Hall begins a romantic relationship with his coworker Jane Wisconsky, who is unhappy with her lot in life and constantly fends off Warwick's lecherous advances.

Warwick is informed that the basement must be cleaned up due to major safety violations that could shut the mill down. Warwick assigns Stevenson to look through the basement and string up lights before he assigns a crew to clean it out, but he's grabbed by a creature and dragged away.

Hall, Wisconsky, Carmichael, Ippeston, Danson and Brogan are assigned to clean the basement. That night, Nordello breaks in to Warwick's office to steal documents showing recommendations for the mill's closure from the exterminator and OSHA. As she leaves, Nordello falls down the stairs into the basement, where the creature devours her. Meanwhile, Warwick believes the graveyard to be the breeding ground for the rats. Cleveland is blackmailed by Warwick to exterminate the rat problem in the graveyard, but he's killed when a stone coffin falls on him.

While cleaning out the basement, Brogan keeps busy by shooting rats with the fire hose. Warwick fires Ippeston after he complains about the rats and work conditions. Hall later discovers a trap door leading to an abandoned part of the mill, which he believes to be the nesting ground for the rat infestation. Warwick forces Hall to enter with a fire hose to kill the rats, but Hall only agrees on the condition that Warwick help him in handling the fire hose. Wisconsky also volunteers, and Warwick forces the remaining workers to go as well, and once downstairs they discover caves beneath the mill. Brogan discovers a severed human hand and, terrified, runs back up, but one of the stairs breaks and he falls into the pool beneath, where the creature devours him.

Carmichael discovers a cave passage with the sound of an outside river and encourages the team to follow him. Once inside, he discovers a hole through which they can reach outside. When Carmichael puts his hand through the hole, he is attacked by the creature, which rips his arm off. The team abandons Carmichael as he is devoured by the creature; a terrified Danson refuses to keep going and is also abandoned by the team. Left alone in complete darkness and hearing a strange noise next to him, he lights a lighter and encounters the creature, who immediately devours him.

Hall and Wisconsky discover the creature's lair, a large cavern filled with human and animal bones. Wisconsky discovers Warwick buried beneath a pile of bones. Now insane, Warwick attacks Hall and Wisconsky, engaging Hall in a brutal battle. Wisconsky attempts to stop him, only to be stabbed by Warwick with a knife. Warwick flees from a vengeful Hall, only to come upon the creature: a large, bat-like rat. Warwick attacks and injures it, only to be killed and devoured. Seeing this, Hall flees and manages to escape into the mill, but the creature follows him and attacks. The creature gets its tail caught in the cotton picker as it closes in on Hall, so he turns on the cotton picker, shredding the creature. The final shot shows a sign outside the still-open mill, stating the mill is under new management.

== TV extended ending ==
Hall punches out ending his shift, and he also punches Wisconsky's shift before leaving the mill.

== Cast ==
- David Andrews as John Hall
- Kelly Wolf as Jane Wisconsky
- Stephen Macht as Warwick
- Andrew Divoff as Danson
- Vic Polizos as Brogan
- Brad Dourif as Tucker Cleveland
- Robert Alan Beuth as Cy Ippeston
- Ilona Margolis as Nordello
- Jimmy Woodard as Charlie Carmichael
- Jonathan Emerson as Jason Reed
- Minor Rootes as Stevenson
- Kelly L. Goodman as Warwick's Secretary
- Susan Lowden as Daisy May
- Joe Perham as Mill Inspector
- Dana Packard as Millworker
- Frank Welker as Giant Bat

== Production ==
The rights to Graveyard Shift were first optioned in 1985 by George Demick, a producer who had apprenticed under George A. Romero during the production of Knightriders, for his company Brimstone Productions. Demick acquired the rights from Stephen King while on vacation in North Carolina and stopped by the set of Maximum Overdrive with an introduction from Romero. John Esposito was hired to adapt the short story to feature length and Tom Savini was slated to provide effects work, however this incarnation never came to be and Demick allowed the option to lapse.

King later optioned Graveyard Shift for a relatively modest $2,500 to William J. Dunn who had worked on King projects such as Creepshow 2 and Pet Sematary as a location scout, as well as having helped to establish the Maine Film Office. King's decision to option Graveyard Shift for a relatively small amount was motivated by the story being a short story as well as the company being small and felt they had interesting enough ideas to warrant a "Pay as you go" type approach. Dunn brought in Ralph S. Singleton to direct the film in what would be his directorial debut after having previously served as an associate producer on Pet Sematary. John Esposito's script was carried over from the unmade Demick production. Dunn secured financial backing for the film from Larry Sugar Entertainment who had previously handled the European theatrical release of Salem's Lot edited from the TV miniseries, and opted to produce Graveyard Shift independently which was motivated by the success of Pet Sematary. Larry Sugar put the film immediately into production hoping to be the very first King adaptation after Pet Sematary, and upon the film's unveiling at the American Film Market, Paramount acquired distribution rights hoping to repeat the success of having distributed Pet Sematary.

The film was shot in the village of Harmony, Maine at Bartlettyarns Inc., the oldest woolen yarn mill in the United States (est. 1821). The historic Bartlett mill was renamed "Bachman" for the movie, an homage to King's pseudonym, Richard Bachman. The interior shots of the antique mill machinery, and the riverside cemetery, were in Harmony. Other scenes (restaurant interior, and giant wool picking machine) were at locations in Bangor, Maine, at an abandoned waterworks and armory. A few other mill scenes were staged near the Eastland woolen mill in Corinna, Maine, which subsequently became a Superfund site.

== Reception ==
The film was received poorly by critics. On the review aggregator website Rotten Tomatoes, it holds a 9% approval rating based on 11 reviews. Audiences surveyed by CinemaScore gave the film a grade of "C−" on scale of A+ to F.

The film was released October 26, 1990 in the United States opening in first place for the weekend; however, due to negative word of mouth, Graveyard Shift saw a steep drop off in attendance the following weekends. It grossed a total of $11,582,891 domestically.

Stephen King heavily disliked the film and named it one of his least favorite adaptations calling it "a quick exploitation picture".

== Home media ==
Graveyard Shift was released on VHS and Laserdisc in 1991. The DVD was released on May 28, 2002, and re-released on August 15, 2017, by Paramount Home Entertainment. Columbia TriStar released the film on Region DVDs and VHS from 1992 to 2003. The film was released on Blu-ray in France on October 3, 2011, Spain and Germany in 2017. On July 28, 2020, Shout! Factory under the Scream Factory label released the film on Blu-ray.

== Soundtrack ==
A limited edition soundtrack release, featuring the score by Anthony Marinelli and Brian Banks, was released on October 6, 2020, from La-La Land Records.
