= John D. Clifford House =

Historic house in Maine, United States

- U.S. National Register of Historic Places
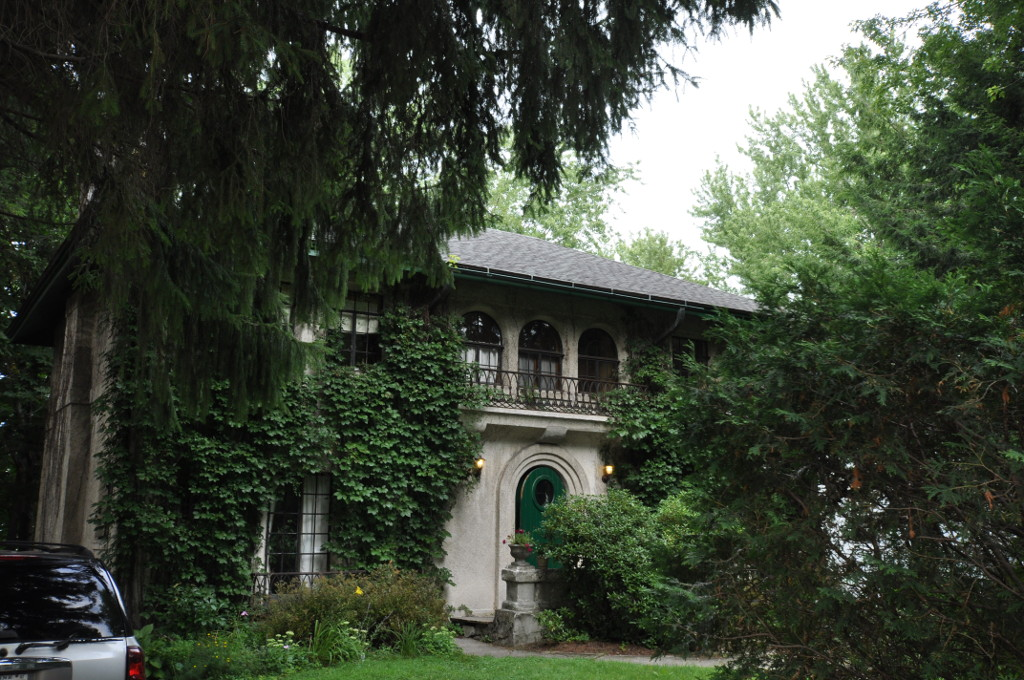

- Location within Maine Location within the United States
- Location: 14–16 Ware St., Lewiston, Maine
- Coordinates: 44°6′35″N 70°12′29″W
- Built: 1926
- Architect: Gibbs & Pulsifer
- Architectural style: Late 19th And 20th Century Revivals, Prairie School
- NRHP reference No.: 87002190
- Added to NRHP: December 30, 1987

The John D. Clifford House is a historic house in Lewiston, Maine. Built in 1926, it is one of a modest number of examples statewide of Mediterranean Revival, and the only one known to have been built as a year-round residence. The building features an eclectic mix of styles, and has a builtin garage, also a rarity for the period. The house was listed on the National Register of Historic Places in 1987.

== Description and history ==
The Clifford House is set on the north side of Ware Street, in a small residential area between Main Street (United States Route 202) and the Bates College campus, north of downtown Lewiston. It is a 2 1/2-story, constructed of Italian tile blocks and finished on the exterior in stucco. Its massing and broad hipped roof are suggestive of the Prairie School, but it has French wrought iron railings across the second-floor porch, arched window openings reminiscent of the Art Deco style, and modern steel casement windows. Its front door is set in a projecting vestibule section, and the door itself has a round-arch top in which is set a circular window. The house is set on a sloping lot with an exposed basement, which houses a garage (original to the design).

The house was designed by the local firm of Gibbs & Pulsifer, and was built in 1926. It is the only known example in the state of a Mediterranean Revival house built for year-round occupancy; all of the others were built along the state's coast for summer residents, and most were designed by out-of-state architects. John D. Clifford, Jr., for whom it was built, was an attorney who served briefly in the state legislature and as United States District Attorney, and was active in organizing the state's Democratic Party. He was judge of the Federal District Court for the District of Maine from 1947 until his death in 1956.
