= Horatio G. Foss House =

Historic house in Maine, United States

- U.S. National Register of Historic Places
- U.S. Historic district – Contributing property
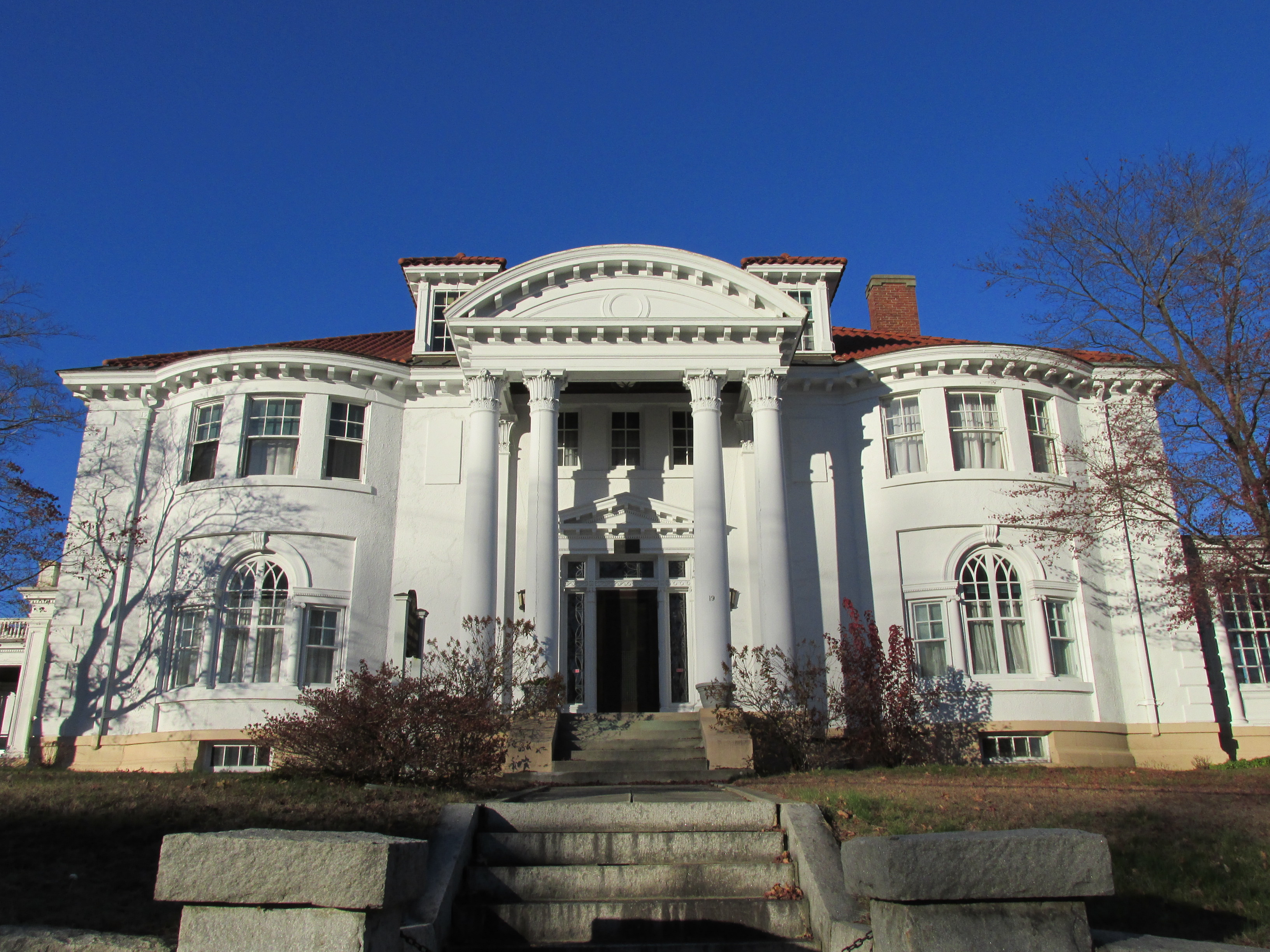
- Horatio G. Foss House

- Location within Maine Location within the United States
- Location: Auburn, Maine
- Coordinates: 44°5′37″N 70°13′38″W
- Built: construction started in 1914 but did not finish till 1917
- Architect: Gibbs & Pulsifer
- Architectural style: Colonial Revival, Other, Federal
- Part of: Main Street Historic District (ID89000255)
- NRHP reference No.: 76000084

Significant dates
- Added to NRHP: November 21, 1976
- Designated CP: April 21, 1989

The Horatio G. Foss House is a historic house at 19 Elm Street in Auburn, Maine within the Main Street Historic District. It was built in 1914 to a design by Gibbs & Pulsifer for Horatio Gates Foss, owner of a major local shoe factory, and is also notable for its well-preserved Colonial Revival styling. It was listed on the National Register of Historic Places in 1976.

== Description ==
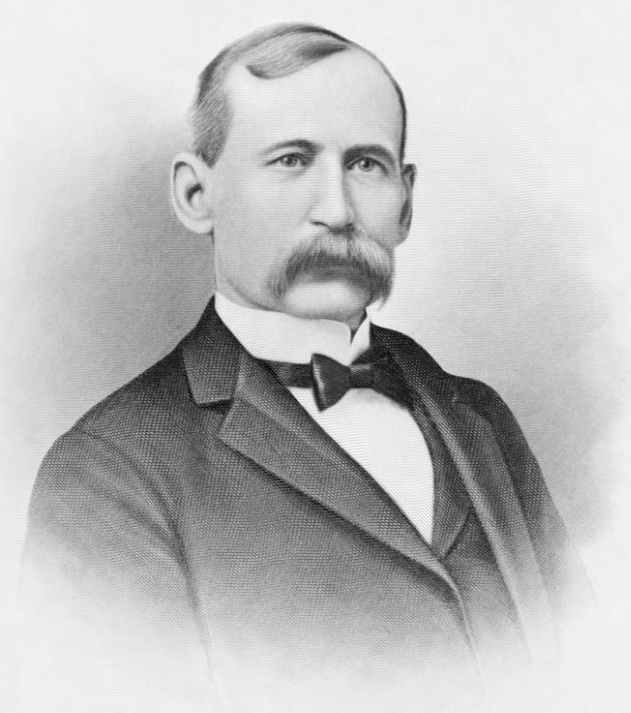
Horatio G. Foss

The Foss House is a three-story wood-frame house with a stuccoed exterior, quoined corners, and a red ceramic tile hip roof. The main facade, facing south, is a symmetrical three bays, with a central entry flanked by rounded bays that are two stories in height. The entry is sheltered by a portico topped by a segmented-arch pediment and supported by paired Corinthian columns. The doorway is flanked by sidelight windows and topped by a triangular pediment The cornices of the portico, doorway pediment, and roof are all modillioned, as are the roof lines of the hip-roof dormers piercing the roof. A sunporch extends along the eastern facade, and a flat-roofed porch on the west side is connected to a porte-cochere. A period garage stands on the northwest corner of the property; it features styling similar to that found on the main house.

The house was designed by Gibbs & Pulsifer, an architectural firm based in Lewiston, and built for Horace G. Foss. Foss was the owner the Dingley-Foss Company, a manufacturer of footwear employing 500-600 workers, and served in the Maine House of Representatives in 1911.

== See also ==
- National Register of Historic Places listings in Androscoggin County, Maine
