= Kora Temple =

- U.S. National Register of Historic Places
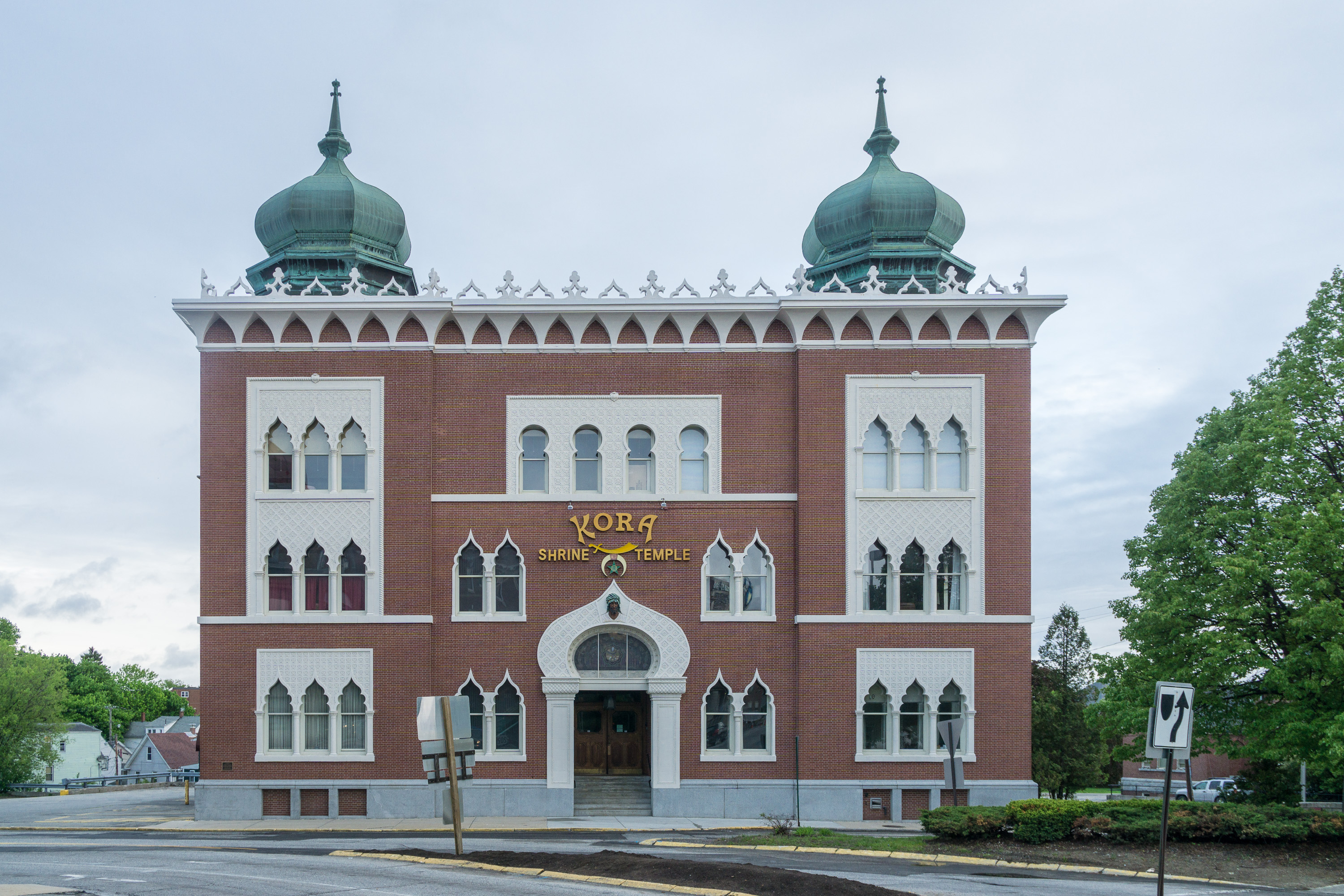

- Location within Maine Location within the United States
- Location: 11 Sabattus St., Lewiston, Maine
- Coordinates: 44°6′1″N 70°12′53″W
- Area: 1 acre (0.40 ha)
- Built: 1908
- Architect: George M. Coombs
- Architectural style: Exotic Revival, Moorish
- NRHP reference No.: 75000088
- Added to NRHP: September 11, 1975

The Kora Temple is a historic Masonic building at 11 Sabattus Street in Lewiston, Maine. The temple was built in 1908 by the Ancient Arabic Order, Nobles of the Mystic Shrine. The Shriners are a fraternal organization affiliated with Freemasonry and are known for their charitable works such as the Shriners Hospitals for Children which provide free medical care to children. The Kora Temple serves as a ceremonial space and clubhouse for the Shriners. The temple building was added to the National Register of Historic Places in 1975 for its distinctive Moorish-inspired architecture.

== Description and history ==
The Kora Temple is located just northeast of Lewiston's downtown area, on a parcel of land bounded by Blake, Main, and Sabattus Streets. It is a three-story brick building, with a flat roof topped by a pair of onion domes. The main façade is ornate, with groups of pointed arch windows trimmed in terracotta filigree predominating. The main entrance is set in a bulbous rounded arch, and there is a band of smaller but similarly arched windows on the third floor above. The building cornice consists of vaulted sections interspersed with pointed-arch niches similar in shape to the windows.

The Kora Temple was organized in 1891, and originally met in Masonic lodge facilities on Lisbon Street, before acquiring a wood-frame building at this site. This temple was built in 1908 to a design by architect George M. Coombs, at a cost of $100,000. The building reflects Moorish and Exotic Revival architectural styles. The interior is ornately decorated with floor-to-ceiling murals, gold filigree, and Tiffany chandeliers. The murals, which depict scenes from Arabic and Islamic history and decorate the Temple's dining hall, were painted by Harry Cochrane, a Shriner and accomplished Maine artist. He accomplished this between 1922 and 1927. The paintings were restored in the 1970s.

== Gallery ==
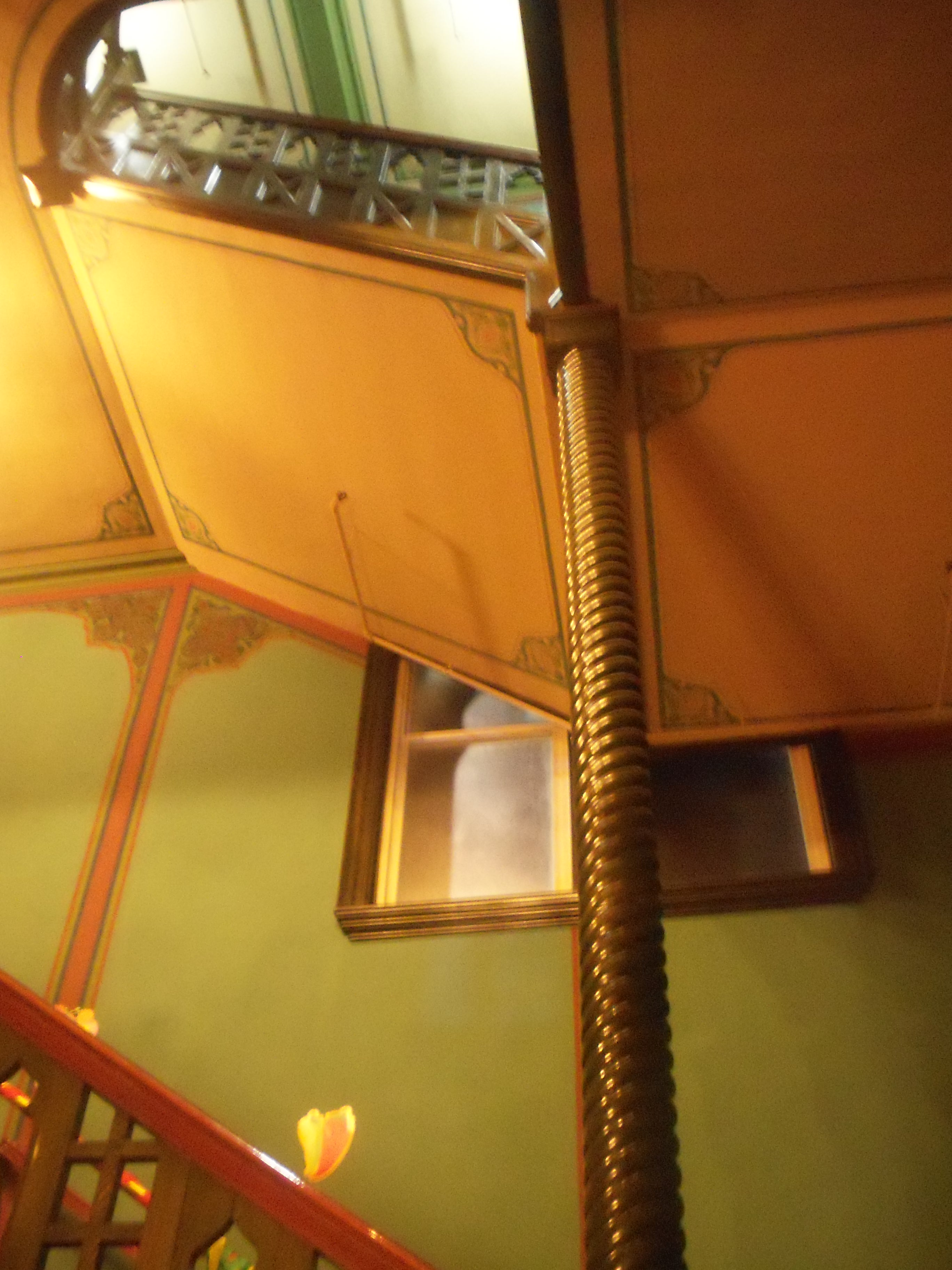
Stairway

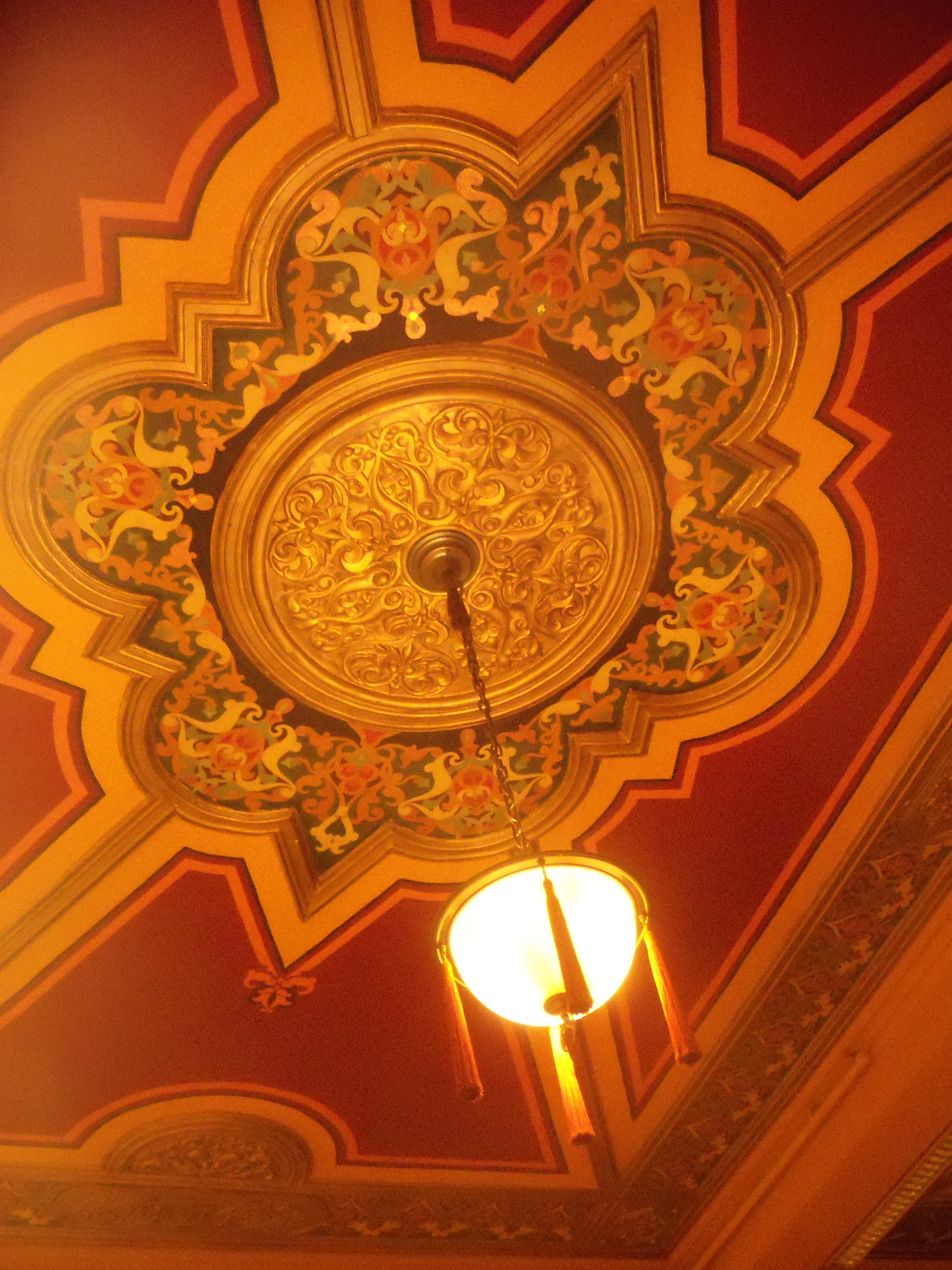
Ceiling in dining hall

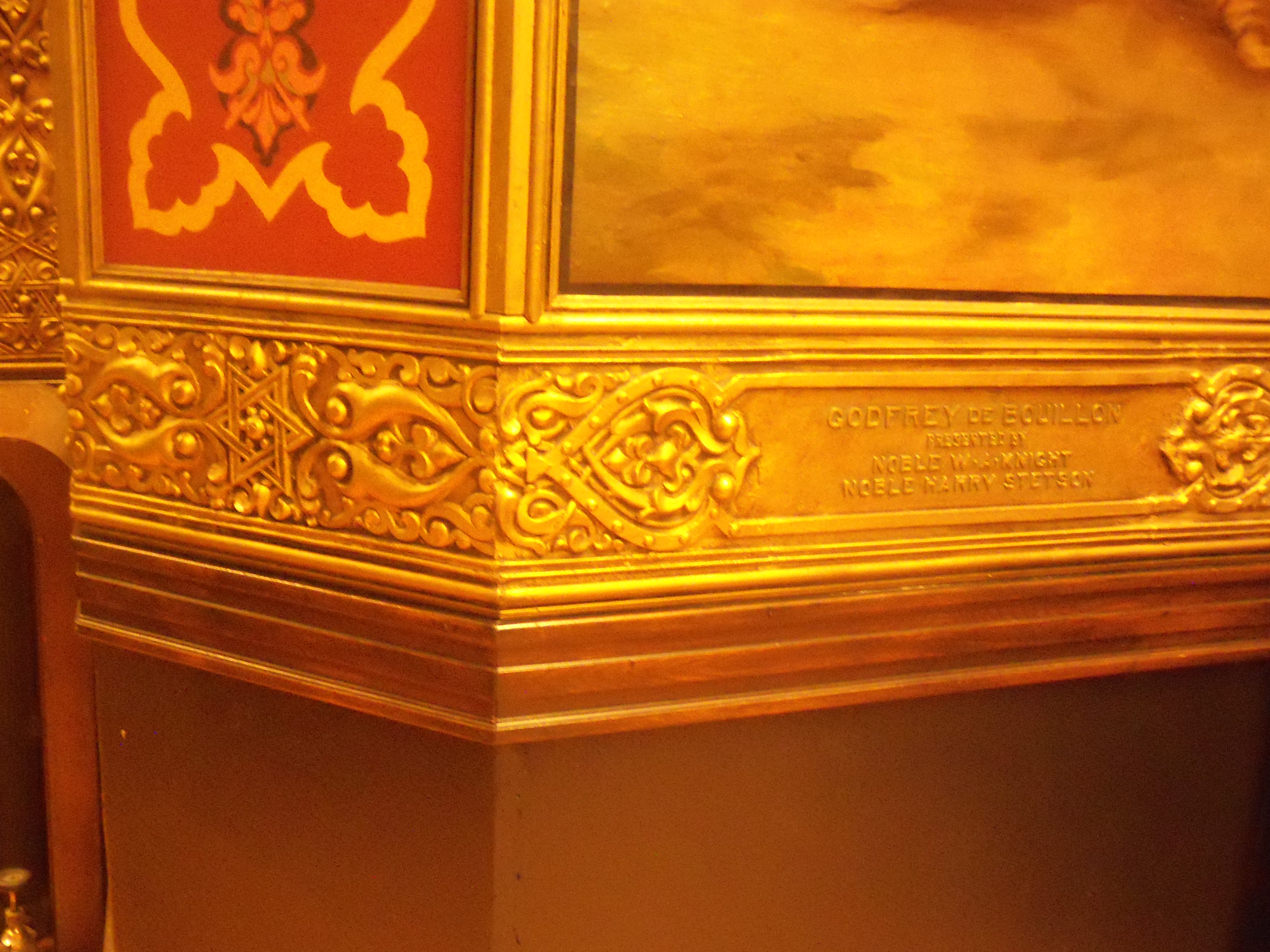
Wall detail in dining hall

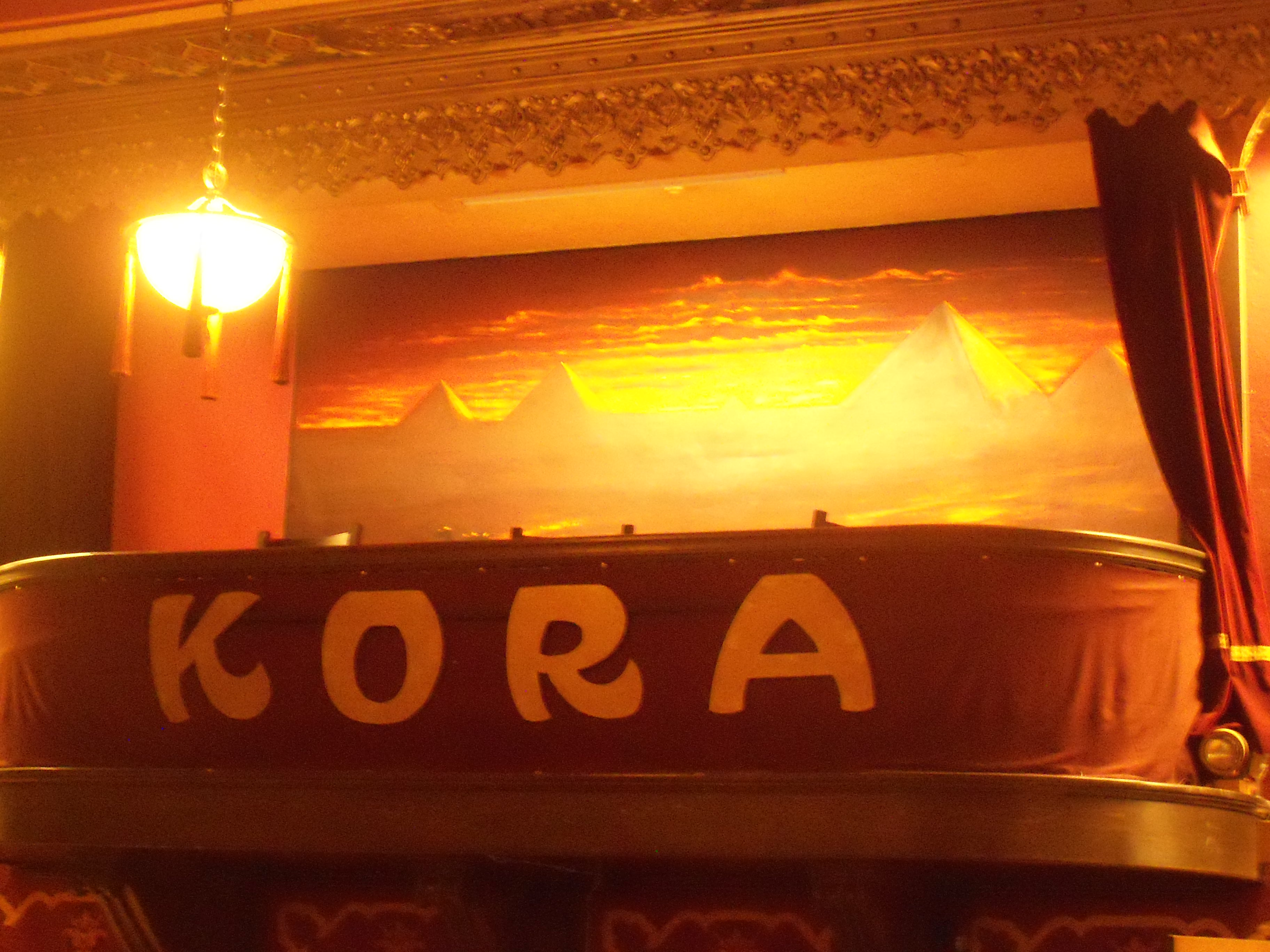
Balcony in dining hall

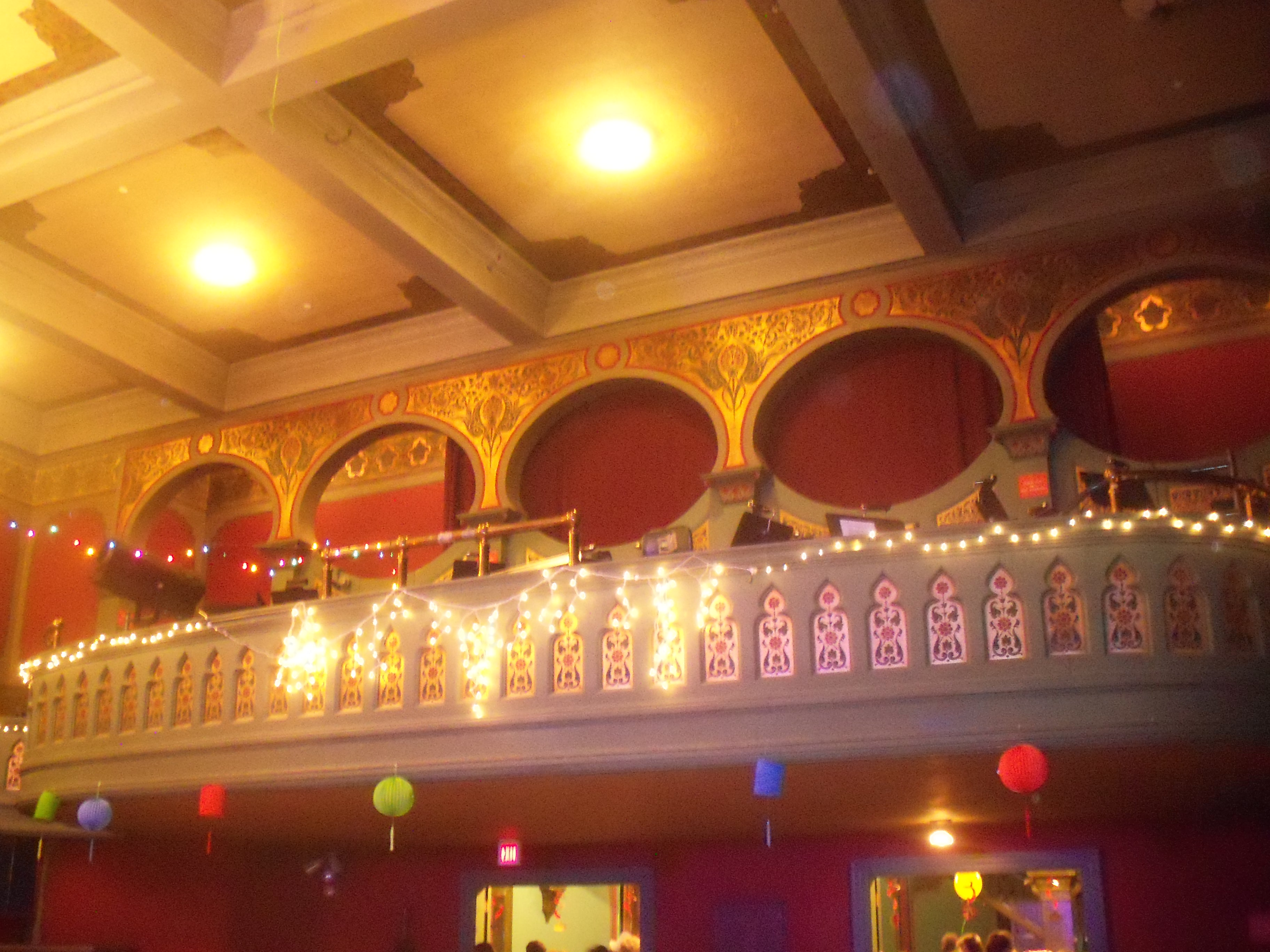
Balcony in auditorium

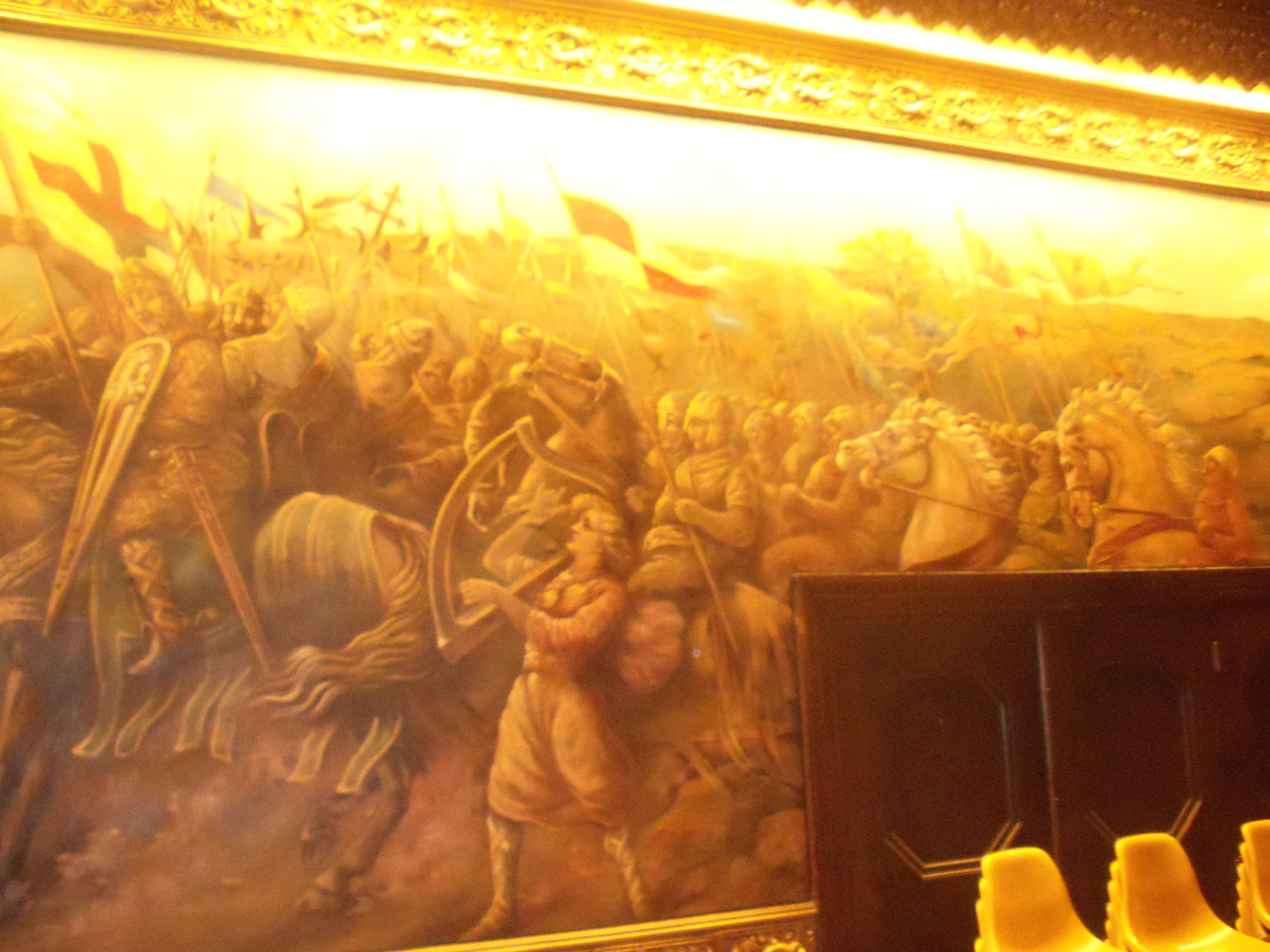
Portion of large mural in dining hall

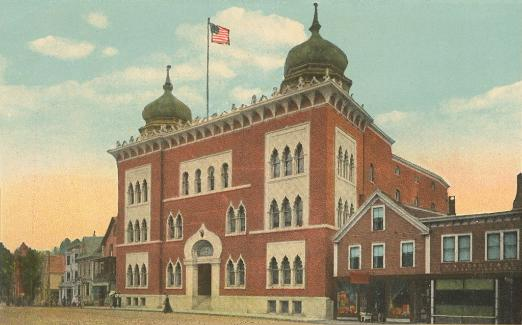
Kora Shrine Temple, Lewiston, ME; from a c. 1915 postcard

== See also ==
- National Register of Historic Places listings in Androscoggin County, Maine
