= Main Street Historic District (Auburn, Maine) =

Historic district in Maine, United States

- U.S. National Register of Historic Places
- U.S. Historic district
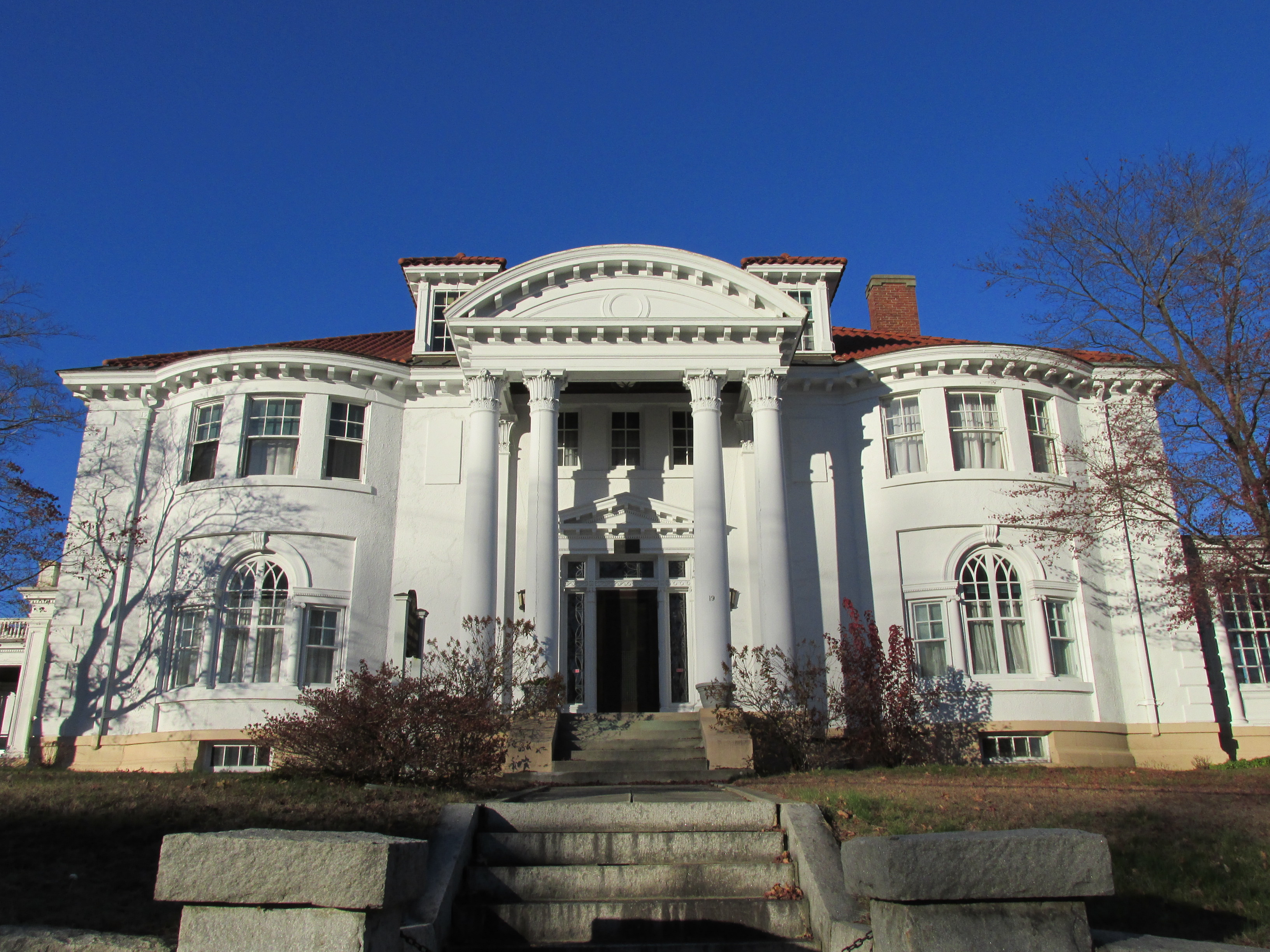
- The Horatio G. Foss House

- Location within Maine Location within the United States
- Location: Auburn, Maine
- Coordinates: 44°05′38″N 70°13′37″W
- Area: 6 acres (2.4 ha)
- Architect: Multiple
- Architectural style: Colonial Revival, Italianate, Queen Anne
- NRHP reference No.: 89000255
- Added to NRHP: April 21, 1989

The Main Street Historic District is a small residential historic district south of the downtown area of Auburn, Maine. The fourteen houses in the district represent a cross-section of residential development during Auburn's growth between about 1825 and 1925. The district extends along Main Street, from Drummond Street south just past Elm Street, and includes a few houses on Elm and Vine Streets. The district was added to the National Register of Historic Places in 1989.

== Description ==
Auburn rose on the banks of the Androscoggin River with the humble beginnings of a log driver's camp in the late 19th century, and did not benefit in the 19th century the way neighboring Lewiston did, which had a more suitable siting for textile mills. A bridge across the river in 1822-23 spurred some development, including along the road which is now Main Street. The Greek Revival Edward Little House, 217 Main Street, is the oldest house in the district, and was built in 1826 by Edward Little, a major proponent of development in Auburn from the 1820s to the 1840s.

The arrival of the railroad in 1848, and the choice of Auburn in 1854 to be the seat of the new Androscoggin County cemented the importance of the area where downtown Auburn is now located, and prompted further residential development in this district. Several Italianate houses were built in 1850s, such as the Roak House (20 Elm Street, built c. 1854) and the Reynolds-Hasty House (201 Main Street, c. 1850).

In the late 19th century a number of high-quality Queen Anne houses were built in the district. Conspicuous among them are the Penley House at 233 Main Street, designed by George M. Coombs and built in 1890; it occupies a prominent position at the corner of Main and Elm Streets. The A. A. Garcelon House at 223 Main Street is probably the most elaborate of Auburn's Queen Anne houses, designed by Coburn and Sons and built in 1890 for a local merchant. It exhibits the busy exterior typical of the style, with projecting sections, elaborate porches, and a domed tower, and was listed separately on the National Register for its architecture.

In the early 20th century several Colonial Revival houses were built, and a number of houses had Colonial Revival additions and alterations made. The Reynolds-Hasty House is an example of the latter, with a porch and picture windows dating from that time. The Horatio G. Foss House at 14 Elm Street is the most significant house built in this time, designed by Gibbs and Pulsifer and built in 1914 for a shoe manufacturer.

== See also ==
- National Register of Historic Places listings in Androscoggin County, Maine
