= Joe Perham =

American humorist

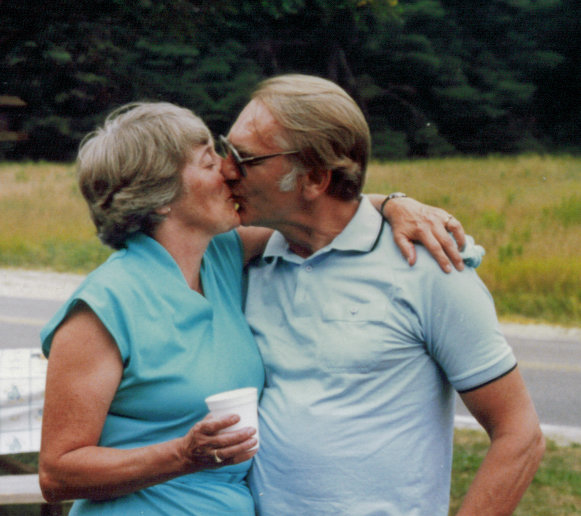
- Joe Perham with wife Margaret c. 1983
- Born: Joseph A. Perham; October 26, 1932; West Paris, Maine
- Died: August 29, 2013 (aged 80); West Paris, Maine
- Occupation: Humorist
- Years active: 1981–2006
- Known for: Maine humor
- Spouse: Margaret (Peg) Perham

Joe Perham (October 26, 1932 – August 29, 2013) was an American humorist, known for his "Down East Maine" humor. Perham's humor style was an influence on Tim Sample. Sample has described Perham as a "seriously funny guy with a professionally honed native wit, which inevitably leaves his audiences weak from laughter."

== Early life ==
Joe was born in West Paris, Maine, and is one of thirteen children in the Perham family. When Perham was eight, his family moved to a 200-acre farm overlooking West Paris. Perham attended Colby College in Waterville, Maine majoring in English and education. After receiving his BA from Colby, he attained advanced degrees at the University of Maine at Orono. While at Colby, Perham was a member of Phi Beta Kappa society, and earned money by working in the feldspar mines for three summers and running a jackhammer the fourth summer for a construction firm, earning 68 cents an hour in the mine and $2.00 an hour running a pneumatic drill. Perham later became a high school English teacher and also taught speech and drama. At age 50, Perham retired from teaching to begin his career as a storyteller and humorist.

== Career ==
Throughout his 25-year career, Perham performed throughout Maine, performing as various characters. His discography consists of over 15 releases. He has appeared in two films: as a mill inspector in Graveyard Shift (1990), based on the novel by Stephen King, and with his wife Margaret Perham (Grover), in Bed & Breakfast (1992), with Roger Moore and Colleen Dewhurst.

== Personal life ==
Perham retired following his diagnosis with Alzheimer's disease, and lived in West Paris, Maine with his wife Margaret, who often appeared in his material, until his death in August 2013.

== Filmography ==
- Bed & Breakfast (1992)
- Graveyard Shift (1990)
