= Edward Little (philanthropist) =

American lawyer

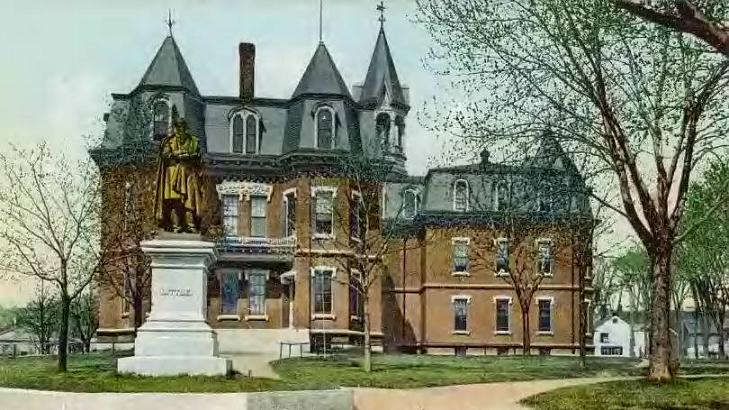
Edward Little High School, named for Little, c. 1906

Edward Little (1773–1849) was an attorney and philanthropist who founded Edward Little High School in Auburn, Maine.

== Early life and education ==
Little was born in Newbury, Massachusetts in 1773 during the American Revolution. His father, Josiah, was a descendant of one of the first settlers of present-day Auburn, Maine. Little attended Phillips Exeter. He then attended Dartmouth College, where he graduated in 1798.

== Career ==
Little was a successful attorney and entrepreneur in what was then Newburyport, Maine. Following a devastating fire in 1811, he moved to Portland, Maine, and then to present-day Auburn, Maine, in 1826.

Following the death of his father in 1830, Little inherited land in the Auburn area. Little was known as "a quiet, scholarly person who was known for his devotion to the community", according to a biographical book authored about him. Little donated to the Congretational church building and Bowdoin College. In 1834, he founded the Lewiston Falls Academy in Auburn, donating 9 acres (3.6 ha) and considerable funds to the academy, which was later named the Little Institute and then Edward Little High School in his honor.

Little lived in the Edward Little House and died in 1849.
