= Edward Little House =

Historic house in Maine, United States

- U.S. National Register of Historic Places
- U.S. Historic district – Contributing property
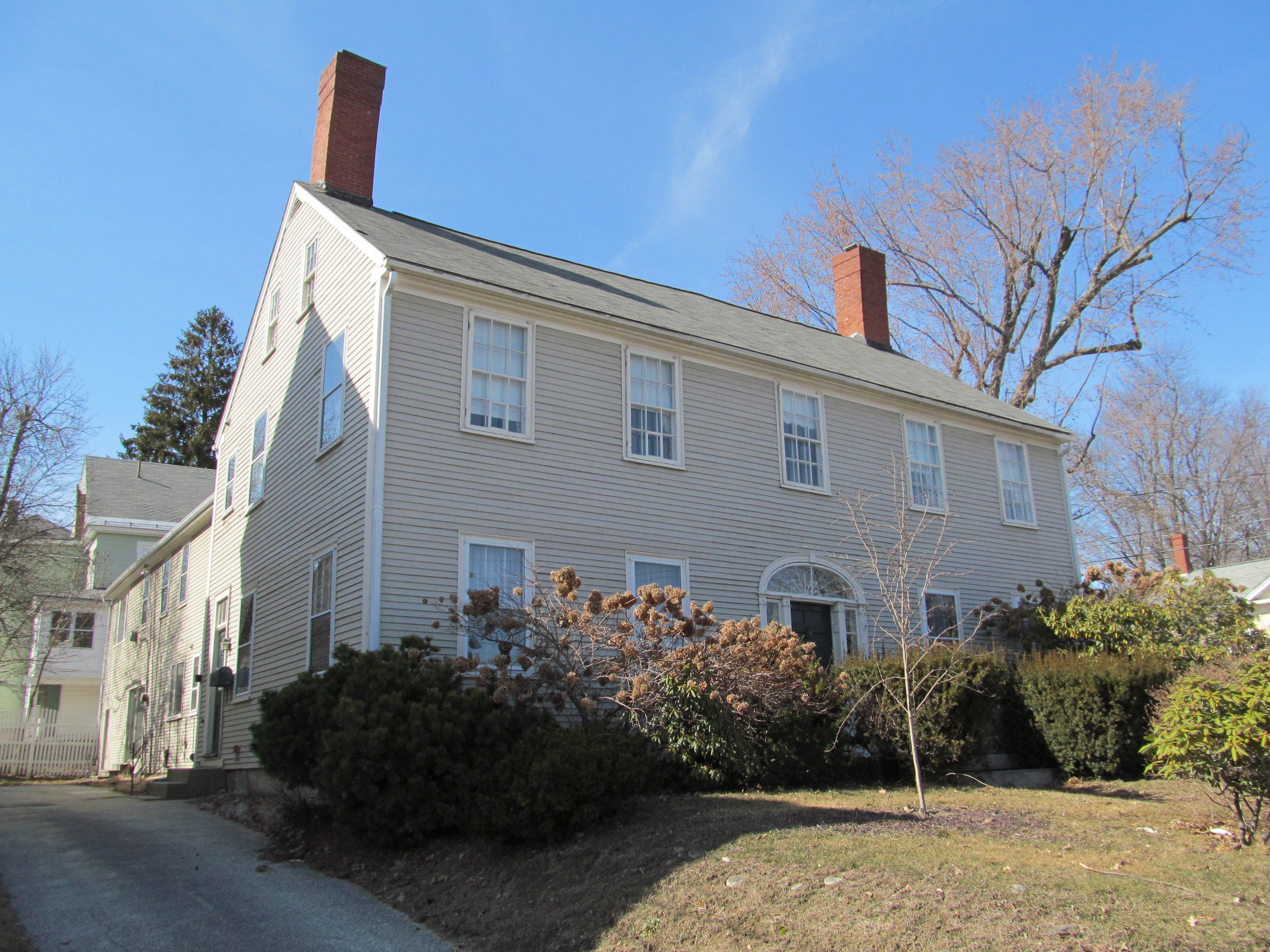
- Edward Little House

- Location within Maine Location within the United States
- Location: 217 Main St., Auburn, Maine
- Coordinates: 44°5′38″N 70°13′35″W
- Built: 1827
- Architectural style: Federal
- Part of: Main Street Historic District (ID89000255)
- NRHP reference No.: 76000086

Significant dates
- Added to NRHP: May 12, 1976
- Designated CP: April 21, 1989

The Edward Little House is an historic house at 217 Main Street in Auburn, Maine. Built in 1827, the Federal style house is one of the oldest on the south side of Auburn, and is most notable as the home of Edward Little, a major landowner and proponent of the development of Auburn. It was added to the National Register of Historic Places in 1976.

== Description and history ==
The Edward Little House stands on the west side of Main Street, south of Auburn's downtown area, at the corner of Vine Street. It is a 2 1/2-story wood-frame structure, five bays wide, with a center entry flanked by sidelight windows and topped by a fanlight. A two-story ell extends from the southern part of the rear. The interior is well preserved, its Federal period details including a handsome curving central staircase. The interior has a typical center hall layout, with a double parlor on the right and a large dining room on the left. The sections of the parlor are separated by an elaborately carved archway.

The house was built in 1827 by Edward Little, a native of Newbury, Massachusetts who moved here in 1826 and spent the rest of his life here. He was the beneficiary of a large land inheritance, which originally include significant holdings in Auburn, Lewiston, and surrounding communities. Little was well known for the many gifts he made to the growing community, supporting both religious and civic institutions.

== See also ==
- National Register of Historic Places listings in Androscoggin County, Maine
