= St. Cyril and St. Methodius Church (Lisbon Falls, Maine) =

Historic church in Maine, United States

- U.S. National Register of Historic Places
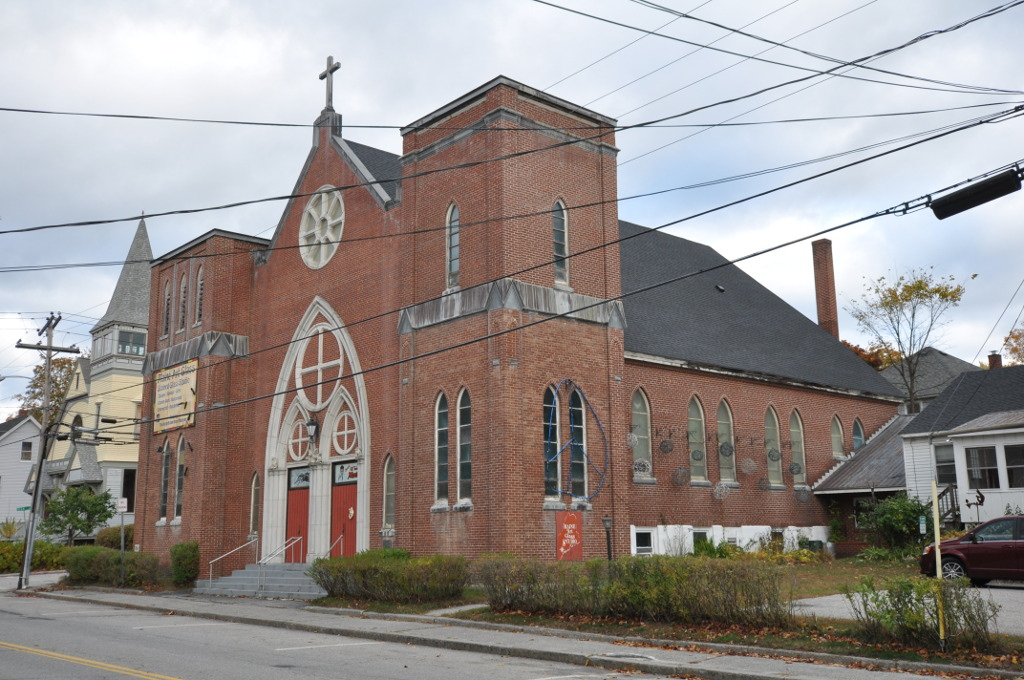

- Location within Maine Location within the United States
- Location: 51 Main St. Lisbon Falls, Maine
- Coordinates: 43°59′57″N 70°3′31″W
- Built: 1926
- Architect: Gibbs & Pulsifer
- Architectural style: Gothic Revival
- NRHP reference No.: 77000061
- Added to NRHP: May 26, 1977

St. Cyril and St. Methodius Church is an historic former church building at 51 Main Street in Lisbon Falls, Maine. The church was designed in 1923 by Lewiston architects Gibbs & Pulsifer, and is an imposing example of neo-Gothic architecture for a relatively small community. It is also the only known church in Maine with association to the Slovak immigrant community. It was dedicated in 1926 and added to the National Register of Historic Places in 1977. It is presently home to the Maine Art Glass Studio.

== Description and history ==
The former St. Cyril and St. Methodius Church is located in the village of Lisbon Falls, at the southeast corner of Main Street (Maine State Route 125) and High Street. It is a large rectangular brick building. with a gabled roof. The front facade is flanked by squat square towers with buttress-style projecting pilasters at the corners. The center of the facade has a large Gothic arch, in which there are two entrances, each also set in arches, with a circle-in-cross design above. Atop the large arch is a wagon-wheel rose window, and the gable above is crested by a cross.

The Slovak community in Lisbon Falls was former in the 1890s, when a group migrated there from New Jersey in search of work at the Worumbo Mill, and formed a tightly knit social group. Alienated from other well-established cultural groups, they formed their own Catholic organization, and raised funds to build this church, which was completed in 1923. It was formally accepted into the Roman Catholic Diocese of Portland in 1936. The building now houses a studio of glass artists.

== See also ==
- National Register of Historic Places listings in Androscoggin County, Maine
