= West Paris, Maine =

Town in Oxford County, Maine, United States

- Town
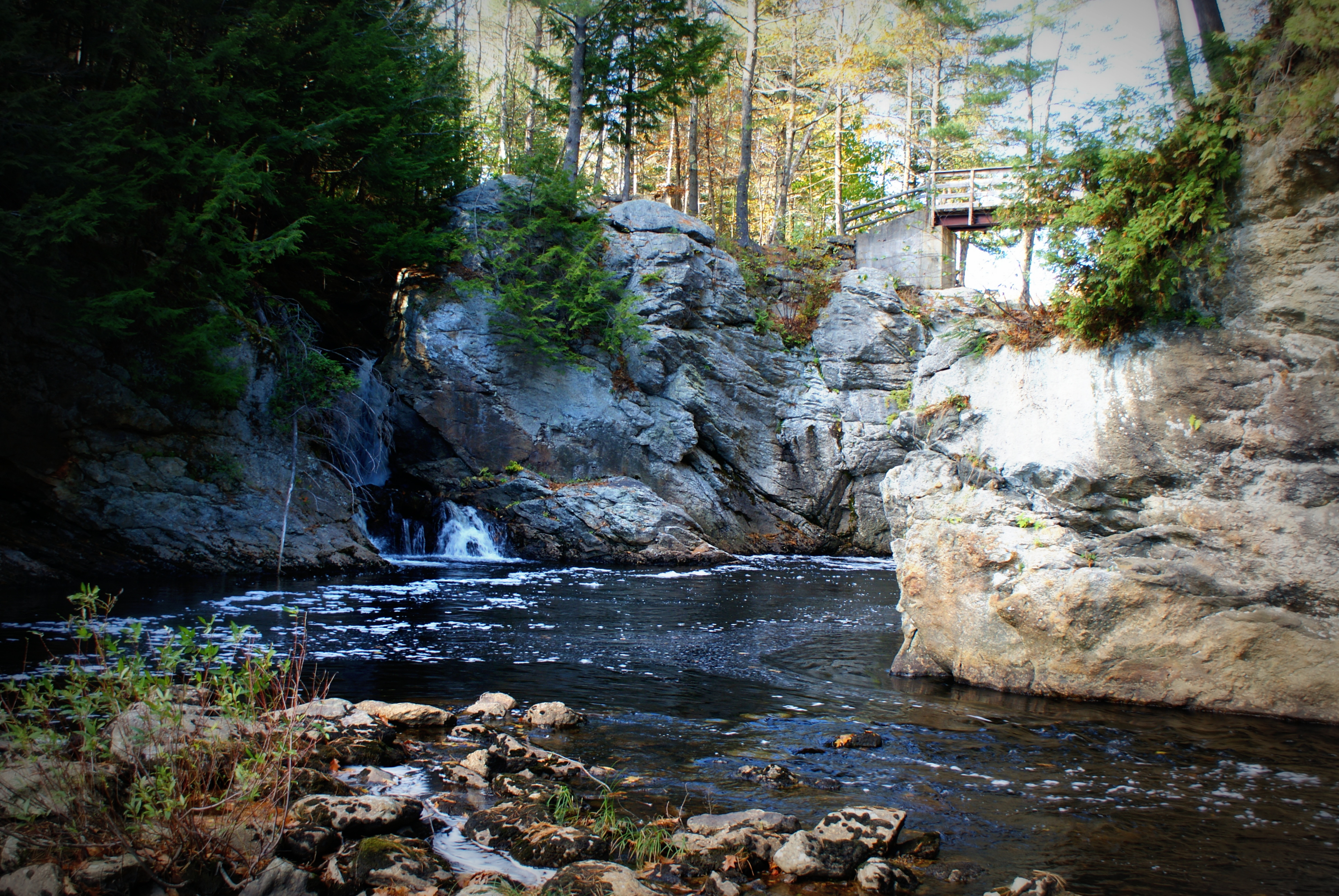
- Snow Falls on the Little Androscoggin River
- Etymology: Prefixed with a cardinal direction derived from the neighboring Paris, Maine, a name of which is believed to be borrowed from Paris, France
- Location within the State of Maine
- Coordinates: 44°20′42″N 70°31′14″W
- Country: United States
- State: Maine
- County: Oxford
- Incorporated: 1957

Government
  - Type: Board of selectmen
  - Chairman: Dale Piirainen

Area
  - Total: 24.40 sq mi (63.2 km^{2})
  - Land: 24.24 sq mi (62.8 km^{2})
  - Water: 0.16 sq mi (0.41 km^{2})
- Elevation: 637 ft (194 m)

Population (2020)
  - Total: 1,766
- Demonym: West Parisian
- Time zone: UTC-5 (Eastern Standard Time)
  - Summer (DST): UTC-4 (Eastern Daylight Time)
- ZIP code: 04289
- Area code: 207
- ISO 3166 code: 3166-2:US
- FIPS code: 23-83890
- GNIS feature ID: 582809
- School district: Maine School Administrative District 17
- School(s): Agnes Gray Elementary School
- Website: www.westparisme.com

West Paris is a town in Oxford County, Maine, United States. West Paris is included in the Lewiston-Auburn, Maine metropolitan New England City and Town Area. Originally settled in 1771 for land that what was deemed "superior for pasturage, hay crops, and orchards", West Paris became a center of Finnish immigrant settlement in the 19th century, with many if the town's current residents being descendants of the original Finnish settlers (Finnish: suomalaiset, IPA: [ˈsuo̯mɑlɑi̯set]). Once part of the neighboring town of Paris, Maine, West Paris seceded from Paris and was incorporated in September 1957. The population was 1,766 at the 2020 census.

== History ==
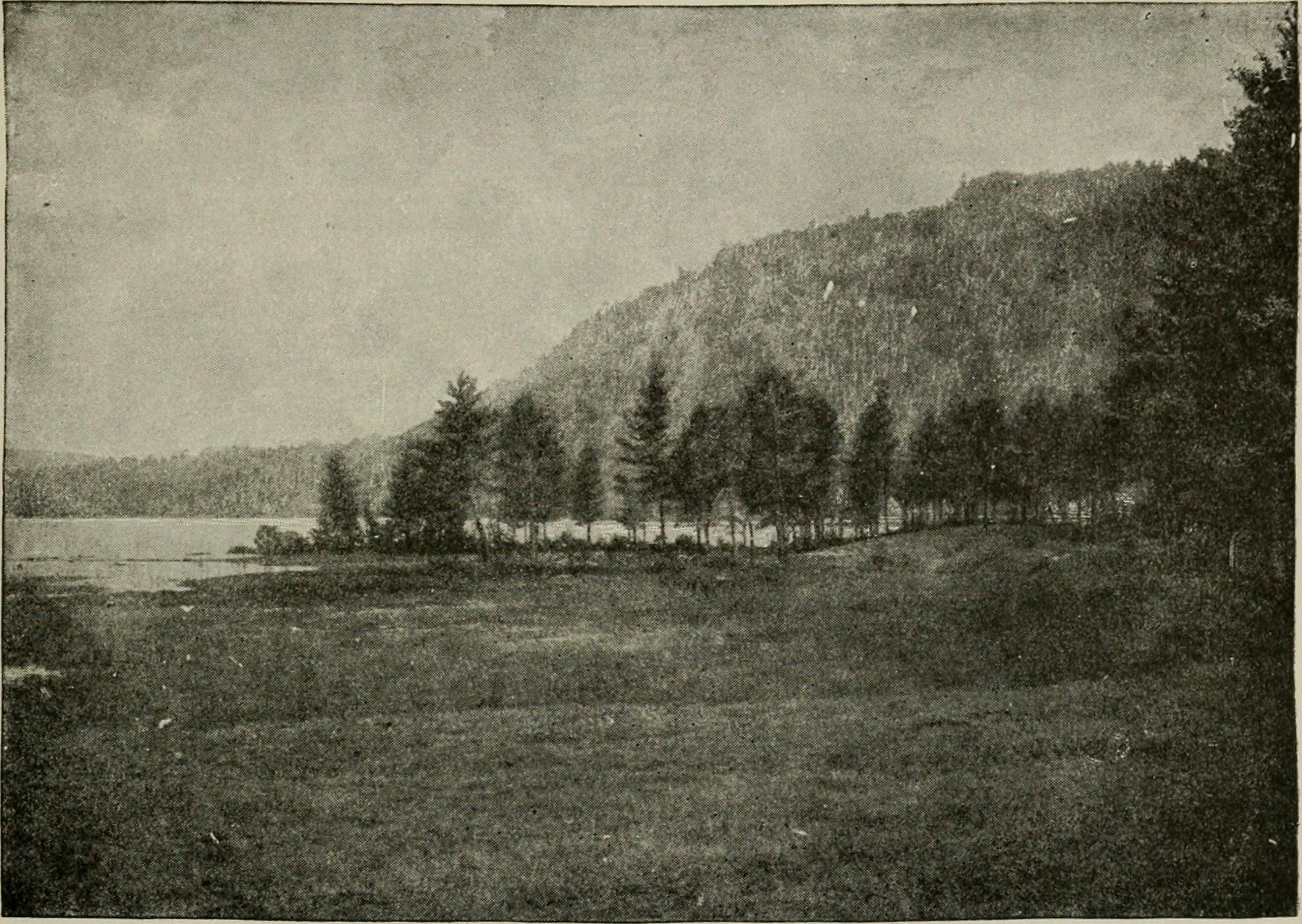
West Paris, from Charles Alden John Farrar's Camp Life in the Wilderness, c. 1892

It began as part of Paris, granted by the Massachusetts General Court in 1771 to Captain Joshua Fuller and his company of 64 soldiers as payment for their service to the colony. First settled in 1779, the land was considered superior for pasturage and hay crops, and orchards were large and productive. Mills were built along the Little Androscoggin River. The Paris Manufacturing Company, which was started modestly by Henry Franklin Morton in 1861 at West Sumner, grew into an important manufacturer. Near the Grand Trunk Railway depot in West Paris, it built a factory to make products including sleds, skis, wagons, step ladders, wheelbarrows, ironing boards, children's rolltop desks and other furniture.

On November 4, 1773, when the Proprietors were lotting out the township, they held a meeting at Coolidge Tavern in Watertown, Massachusetts and they voted that there be reserved for the use of the proprietors their heirs and assigns forever two rods in width on the eastward side of every range line through the length of the township for the conveniency of ways if it shall be needed, establishing rangeways to prevent landlocking and segregation in the township of Paris and West Paris.

In September 1957, West Paris was set off and incorporated as a town.

== Geography ==
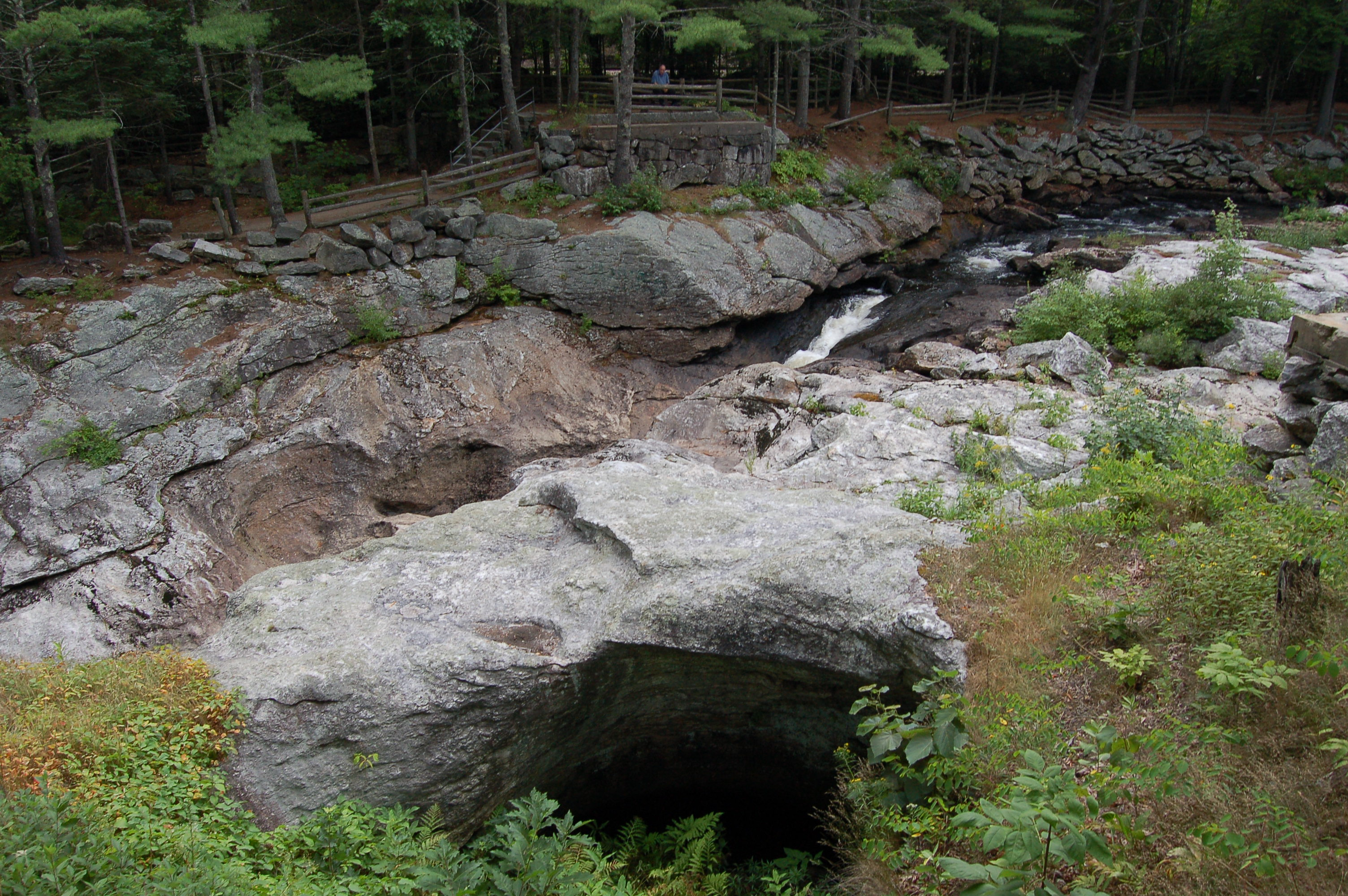
Snow Falls in 2007

According to the United States Census Bureau, the town has a total area of 24.40 square miles (63.20 km^{2}), of which 24.24 square miles (62.78 km^{2}) is land and 0.16 square miles (0.41 km^{2}) is water. Parts of West Paris act as a drainage basin for the Little Androscoggin River.

West Paris is home to Snow Falls, a 40-foot waterfall that drops into a gorge created by the Little Androscoggin River.

The town is crossed by state routes 26 and 219.

=== Climate ===
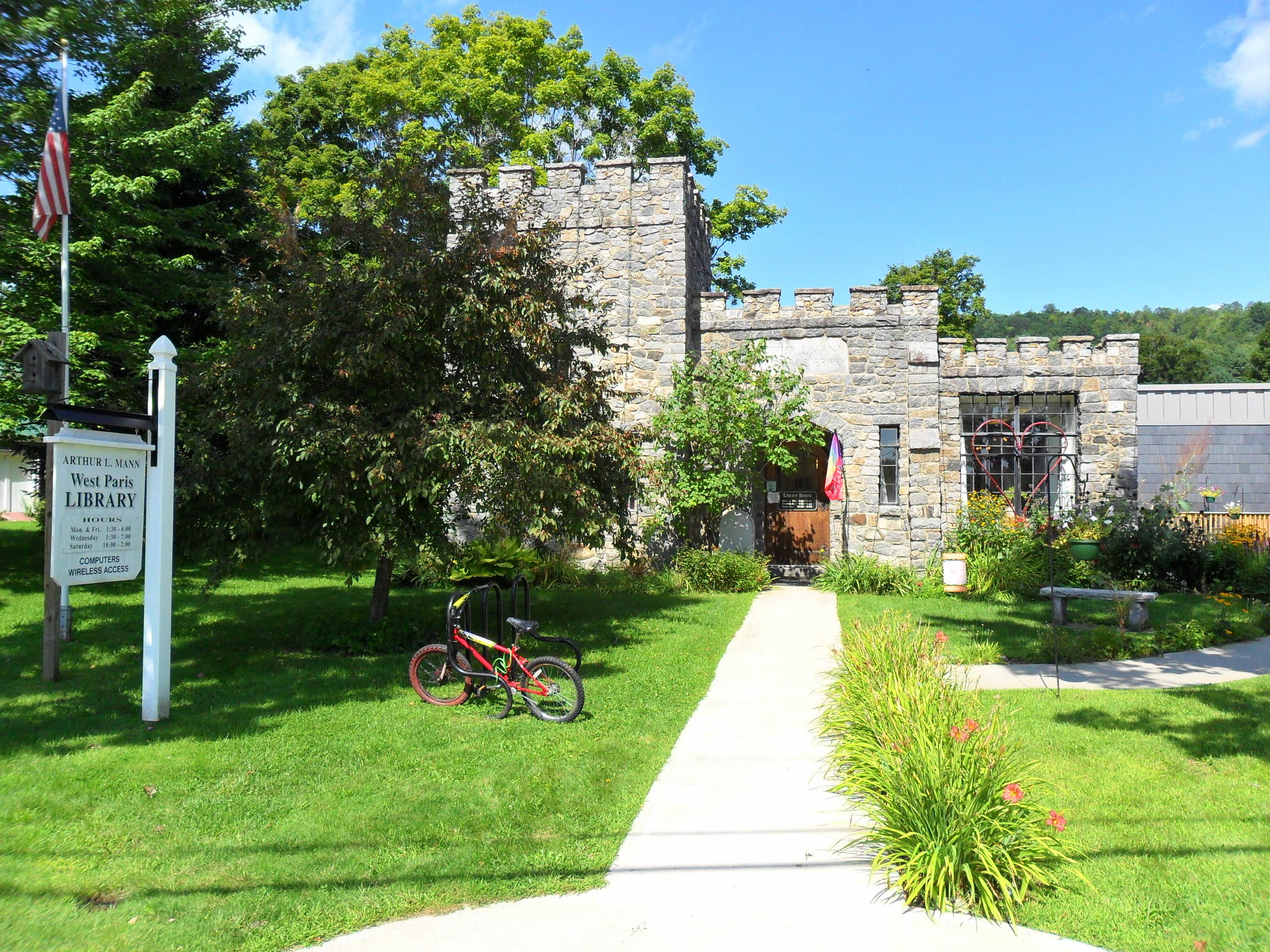
Arthur L. Mann Memorial Library in 2013

This climatic region is typified by large seasonal temperature differences, with warm to hot (and often humid) summers and cold (sometimes severely cold) winters. According to the Köppen Climate Classification system, West Paris has a humid continental climate, abbreviated "Dfb" on climate maps.

== Demographics ==
Historical population
Census	Pop.	Note	%±
1960	1,050		—
1970	1,171		11.5%
1980	1,390		18.7%
1990	1,514		8.9%
2000	1,722		13.7%
2010	1,812		5.2%
2020	1,766		−2.5%
United States Decennial Census

=== 2020 census ===
As of the 2020 United States decennial census and their demographics survey program, the American Community Survey, there were 1,766 people in West Paris, with an estimated median age of 44.4 years.

=== 2010 census ===
As of the census of 2010, there were 1,812 people, 700 households, and 478 families living in the town. The population density was 74.8 inhabitants per square mile (28.9/km^{2}). There were 812 housing units at an average density of 33.5 per square mile (12.9/km^{2}). The racial makeup of the town was 97.4% White, 0.2% African American, 0.6% Native American, 0.2% Asian, 0.4% from other races, and 1.2% from two or more races. Hispanic or Latino of any race were 1.8% of the population. There were 700 households, of which 34.4% had children under the age of 18 living with them, 49.0% were married couples living together, 12.0% had a female householder with no husband present, 7.3% had a male householder with no wife present, and 31.7% were non-families. 25.0% of all households were made up of individuals, and 10.2% had someone living alone who was 65 years of age or older. The average household size was 2.45 and the average family size was 2.84. The median age in the town was 41.6 years. 23.3% of residents were under the age of 18; 7.9% were between the ages of 18 and 24; 23.5% were from 25 to 44; 26.7% were from 45 to 64; and 18.6% were 65 years of age or older. The gender makeup of the town was 49.4% male and 50.6% female.

== Notable people ==
- Joe Perham, comedian and humorist
- DeForest H. Perkins, educator and political activist, Grand Dragon of the Ku Klux Klan in Maine
- Francis Slattery, United States Navy commander
