= Elmer I. Thomas =

American architect

- Born: 1863; Lewiston, Maine, US
- Died: December 25, 1895 (aged 31–32); Auburn, Maine, US
- Occupation: Architect
- Buildings: Brunswick High School, Atkinson Building, Opera House Block, Roger Williams Hall

Elmer I. Thomas (1863–1895) was an American architect who practiced in Auburn and Lewiston, Maine.

== Biography ==
Elmer Thomas was born in Lewiston in 1863 to Sylvanus D. and Julia Thomas. He attended the public schools before entering Amherst College, where he remained for only two or three years. After a period at the Massachusetts Institute of Technology, he entered the office of noted Lewiston architect George M. Coombs, remaining with him until the end of the decade. After gaining a position of high responsibility, he departed from the office in 1889. He operated an office in Auburn until December 1893, when he relocated to Lewiston, reestablishing his office in the new Osgood Building. He died on Christmas Day in 1895, at the age of 33. Early the following year his chief assistant, William R. Miller, began operating the office under his own name.

Despite his brief career, Thomas became one of Maine's most sought-after architects within a few years of beginning his practice. He was also the state's first architect to have a college education. At least two of his works have been individually listed on the National Register of Historic Places, and several more contribute to listed historic districts.

== Architectural work ==
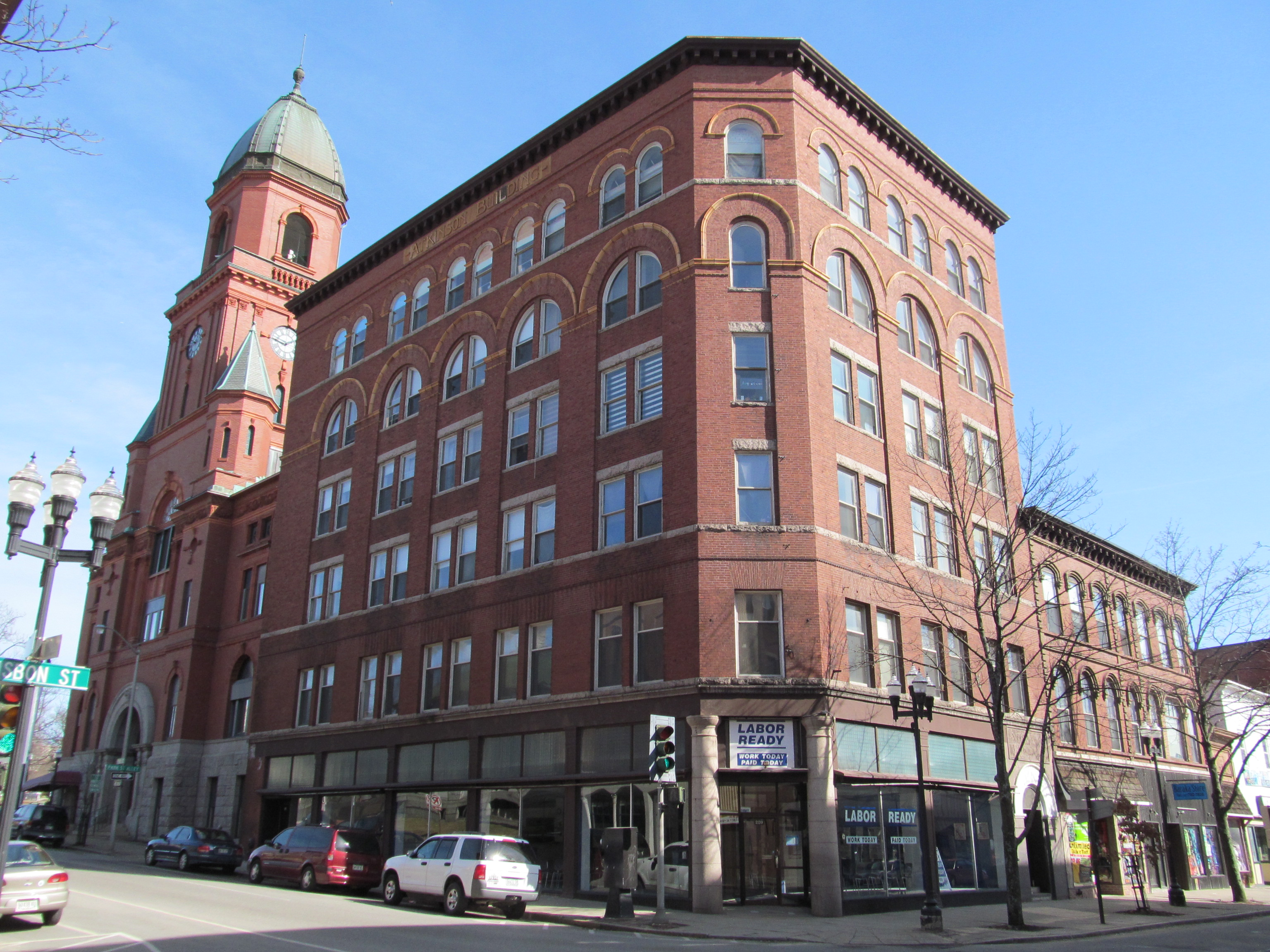
Atkinson Building, Lewiston, 1892.

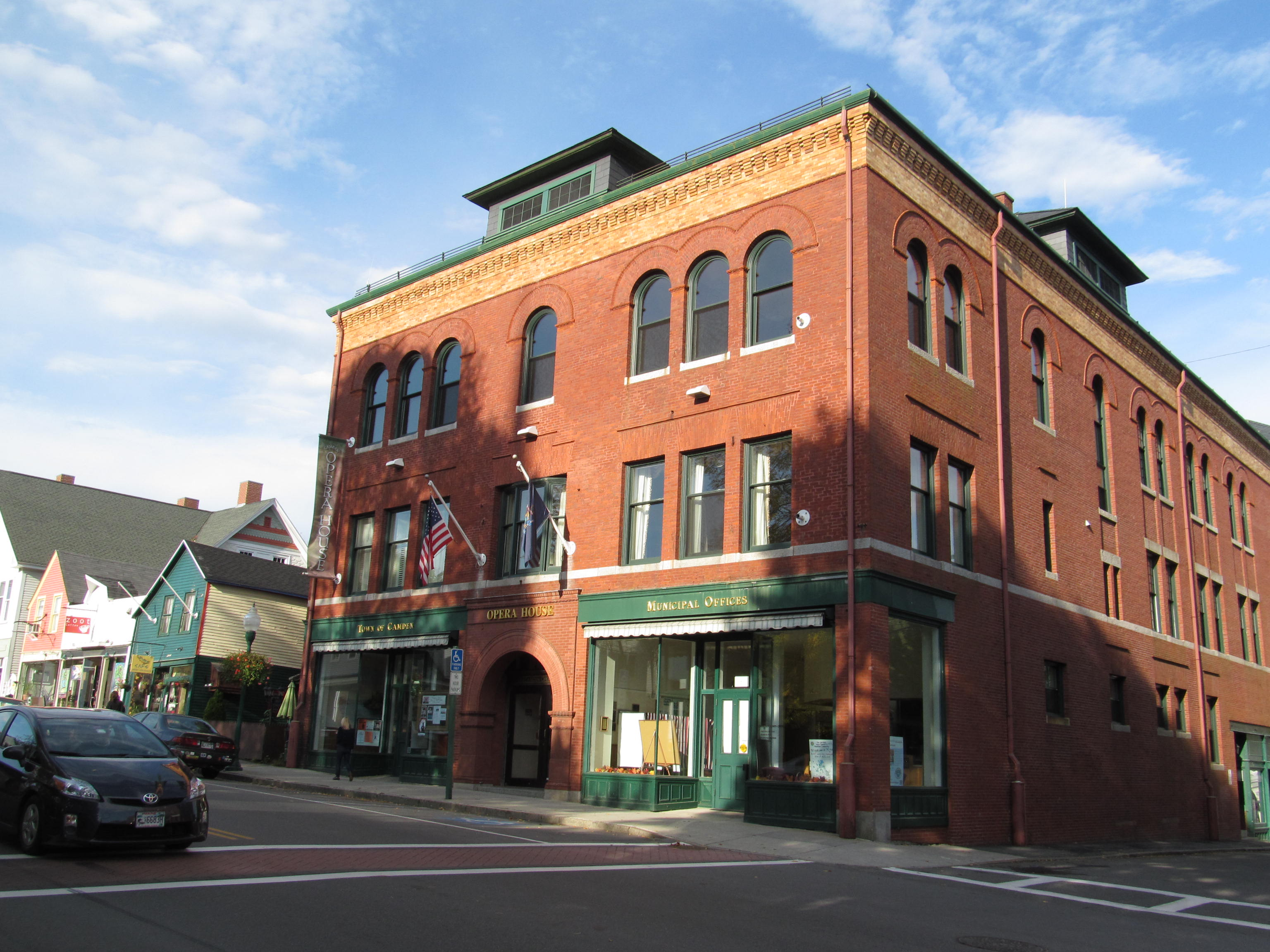
Opera House Block, Camden, 1893.

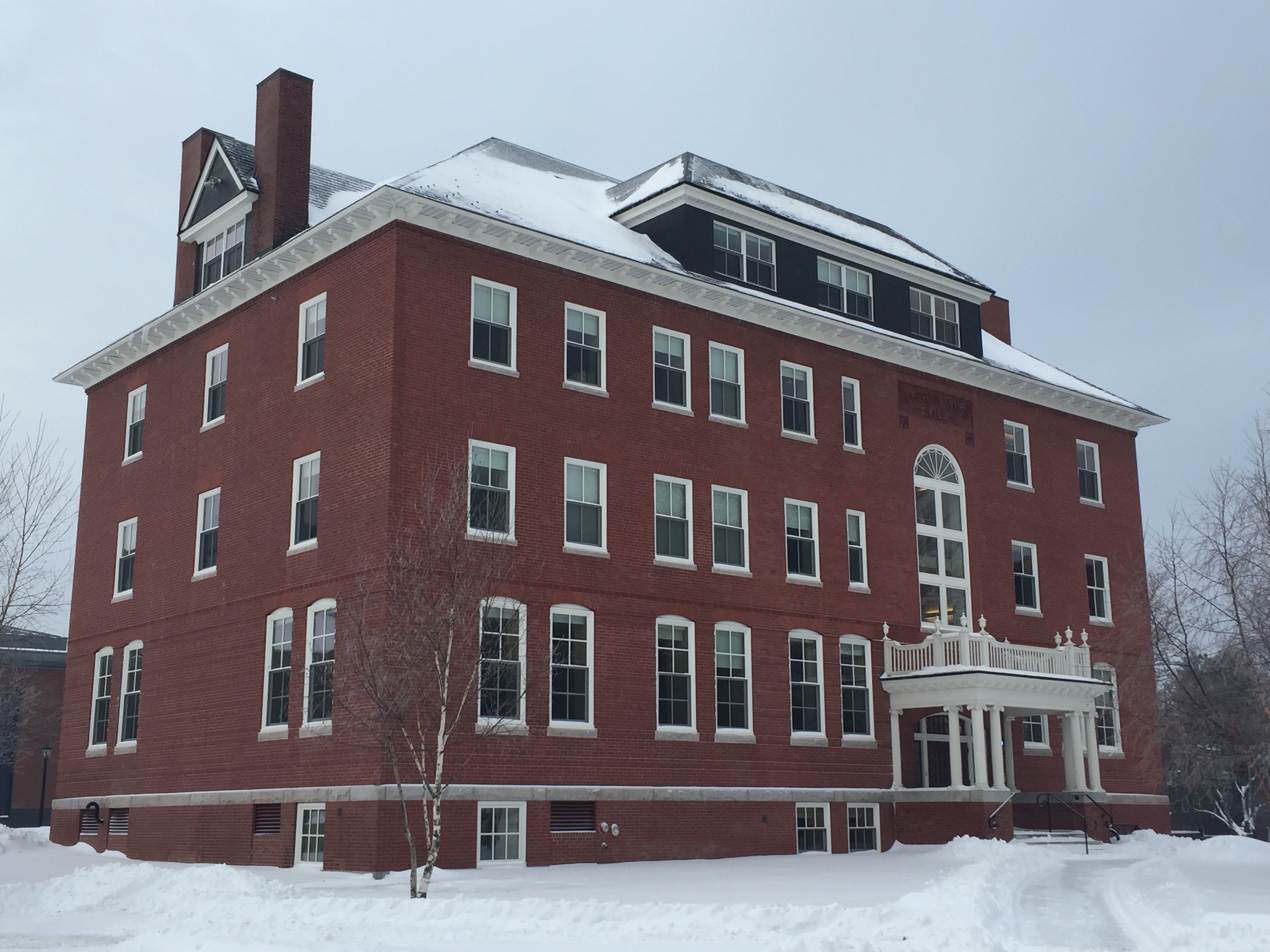
Roger Williams Hall, Bates College, 1894.

- 1888 - Mechanics Savings Bank Building, 79 Main St, Auburn, Maine
  - George M. Coombs, architect of record
- 1889 - George D. Armstrong House, 27 Frye St, Lewiston, Maine
- 1890 - Enoch Lowell House, 402 Main St, Saco, Maine
- 1891 - Brunswick High School (Hawthorne School), 46 Federal St, Brunswick, Maine
  - Substantially rebuilt after a 1915 fire.
- 1891 - Sylvanus D. Thomas Duplex, 185 Main St, Auburn, Maine
  - Occupied in part by the architect
- 1892 - Atkinson Building, 220 Lisbon St, Lewiston, Maine
- 1892 - Byron Armstrong House, 29 Frye St, Lewiston, Maine
- 1892 - Bethel M. E. Church, 75 Main St, Bethel, Maine
- 1892 - Fairfield Block, 148 Main St, Biddeford, Maine
- 1892 - McLain School, 40 Lincoln St, Rockland, Maine
- 1893 - Opera House Block, 29 Elm St, Camden, Maine
- 1894 - John H. Chase House, 16 Elm St, Auburn, Maine
- 1894 - Roger Williams Hall, Bates College, Lewiston, Maine
- 1895 - Hall Cottage, Good Will Home and School, Hinckley, Maine
- 1895 - E. Mont Perry House, 70 Beech Street, Rockland Maine
- 1895 - Weston Avenue School, head of Middle St, Madison, Maine
  - Demolished in 2014
