= Jefferson L. Coburn =

American architect

Jefferson Lake Coburn
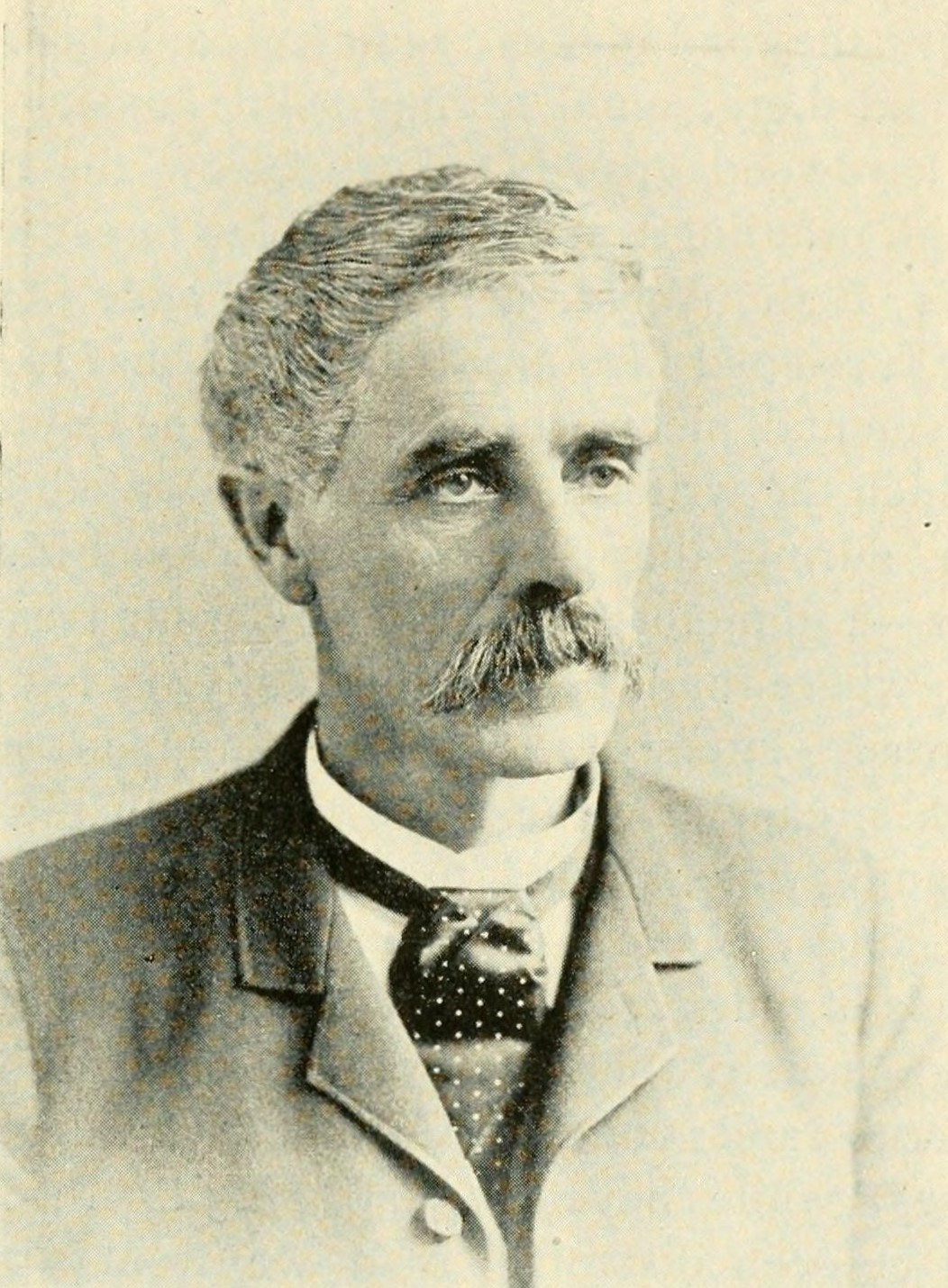
- Jeff. L. Coburn, 1894
- Born: March 30, 1835; Buckfield, Maine
- Died: October 3, 1917 (aged 82); Falmouth Foreside, Maine
- Occupation: Architect

Jefferson Lake Coburn (1835–1917) was an American architect in Maine. Many of his works were completed as a member of the architectural firm Coburn & Sons.

== Life and career ==
Jefferson Lake Coburn, known professionally as Jeff. L. Coburn, was born March 30, 1835, in Buckfield, Maine, to Hiram Coburn and Eliza (Gardner) Coburn. He was raised in Carthage. When the American Civil War began, he enlisted in the 10th Maine Infantry Regiment, and later reenlisted with the 29th Maine Infantry Regiment. In 1864 his company was attached to the 1st District of Columbia Cavalry Regiment, and later that year he was transferred to the 1st Maine Cavalry Regiment, with which he saw out the rest of the war. He was discharged with the rank of second lieutenant. In later life he claimed to have been the only man who was wounded after the surrender of Lee.

Sometime after the war he moved to Lewiston, where he worked as a contractor and builder until at least 1882. By 1884 he was working instead as an architect. Circa 1889 he reestablished his practice as Coburn & Sons, though only one of his sons was living. Coburn continued to practice past his son's death in 1897 until at least 1901, and probably retired shortly thereafter.

== Personal life and death ==
Coburn was married first in 1860 to Lois Emerson, and they had one daughter: Cedell Coburn (1860–1947). After his first wife died in 1863, he married second to Mary Frances Allen. They had one daughter, Lora Lee Coburn (1864–1866) and two sons, Leon Coburn (1869–1887) and Forest G. Coburn (1871–1897). Coburn died October 3, 1917, at Falmouth Foreside. He is buried in Lewiston's Riverside Cemetery.

== Legacy ==
At least six buildings designed by Coburn, alone and with his son, have been listed on the United States National Register of Historic Places. Others contribute to listed historic districts.

== Architectural works ==
- James C. Lord House, (Note: A contributing property to the Main Street–Frye Street Historic District, NRHP-listed in 2009.) 497 Main St, Lewiston, Maine (1885, NRHP 1978)
- John W. Perry House, 481 Main St, Lewiston, Maine (1886)
- A. A. Garcelon House, (Note: A contributing property to the Main Street Historic District, NRHP-listed in 1989.) 223 Main St, Auburn, Maine (1890, NRHP 1986)
- Healy Asylum, 81 Ash St, Lewiston, Maine (1892–93, NRHP 1979)
- Osgood Building, (Note: A contributing property to the Lewiston Commercial Historic District, NRHP-listed in 2018.) 129 Lisbon St, Lewiston, Maine (1893, NRHP 1986)
- St. Hyacinth School, 2 Walker St, Westbrook, Maine (1893–94, NRHP 2013)
- Basilica of Saints Peter and Paul rectory, 27 Bartlett St, Lewiston, Maine (1894–95)
- First McGillicuddy Block, 133 Lisbon St, Lewiston, Maine (1895, NRHP 1986)
- Hayes Block, 288 Main St, Lewiston, Maine (1897)
- Levi J. Gunn House, Inner Heron Island, Maine (1887)

== Gallery of architectural works ==
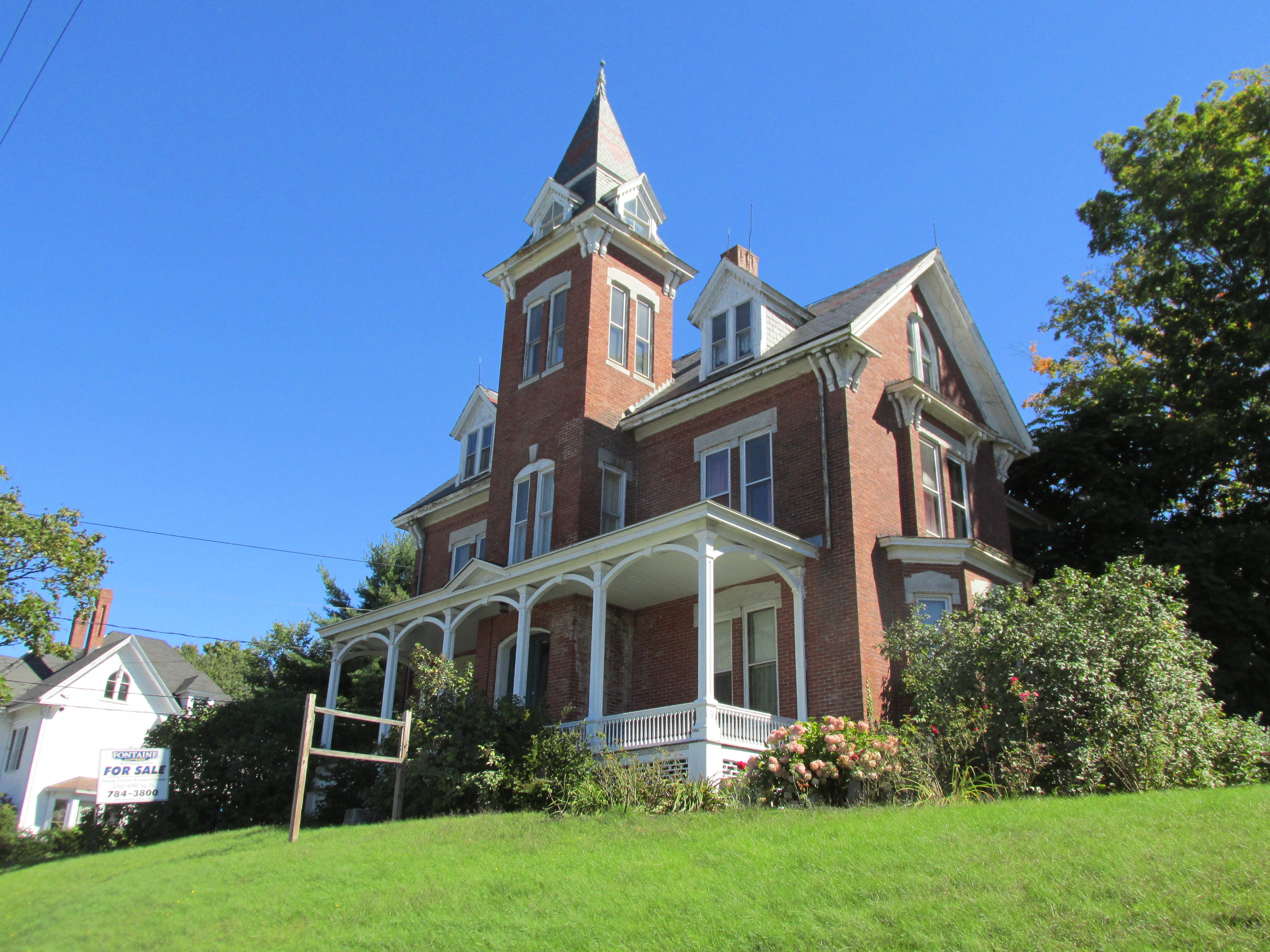
James C. Lord house, Lewiston, Maine, 1885.

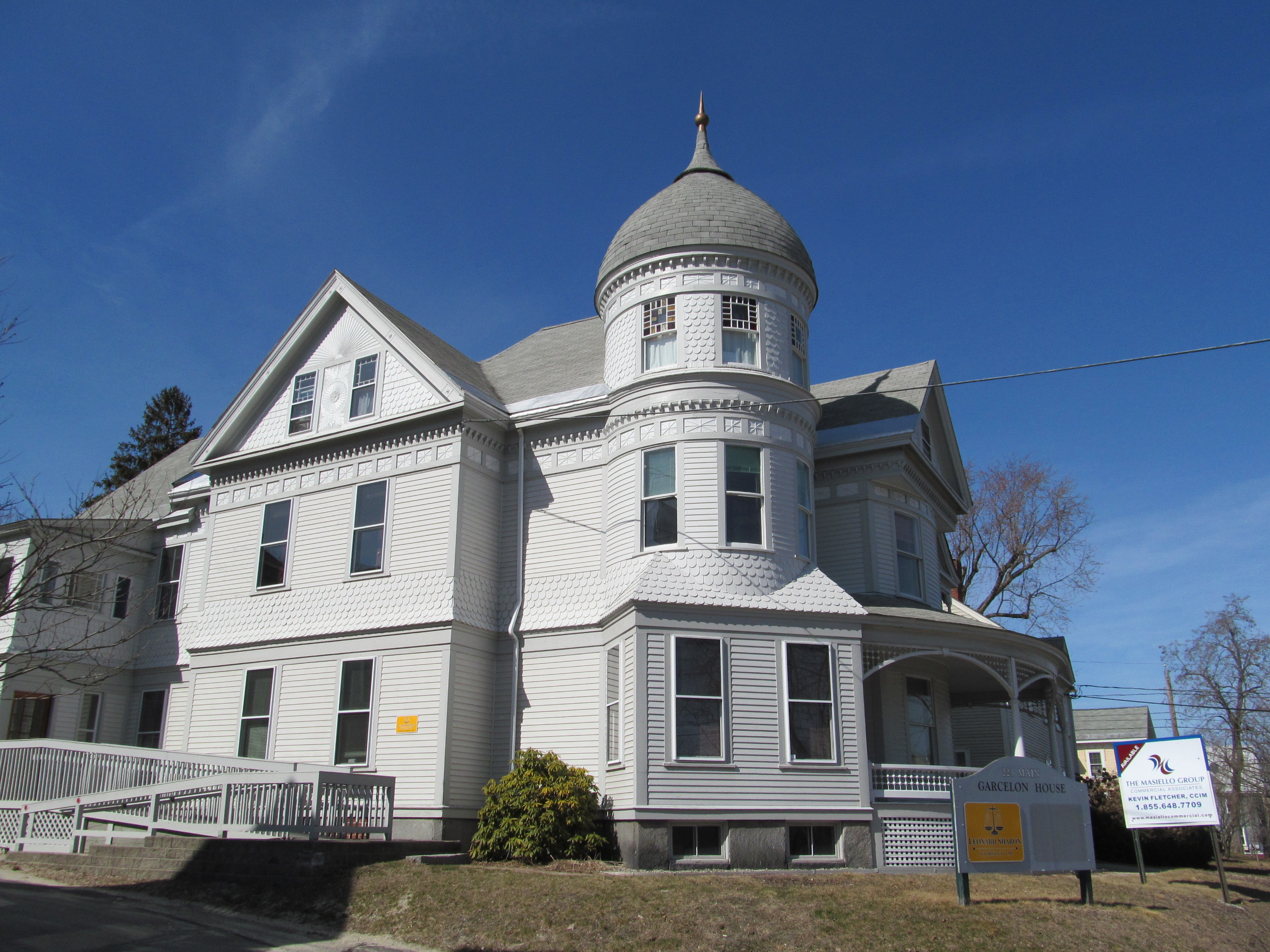
A. A. Garcelon house, Auburn, Maine, 1890.

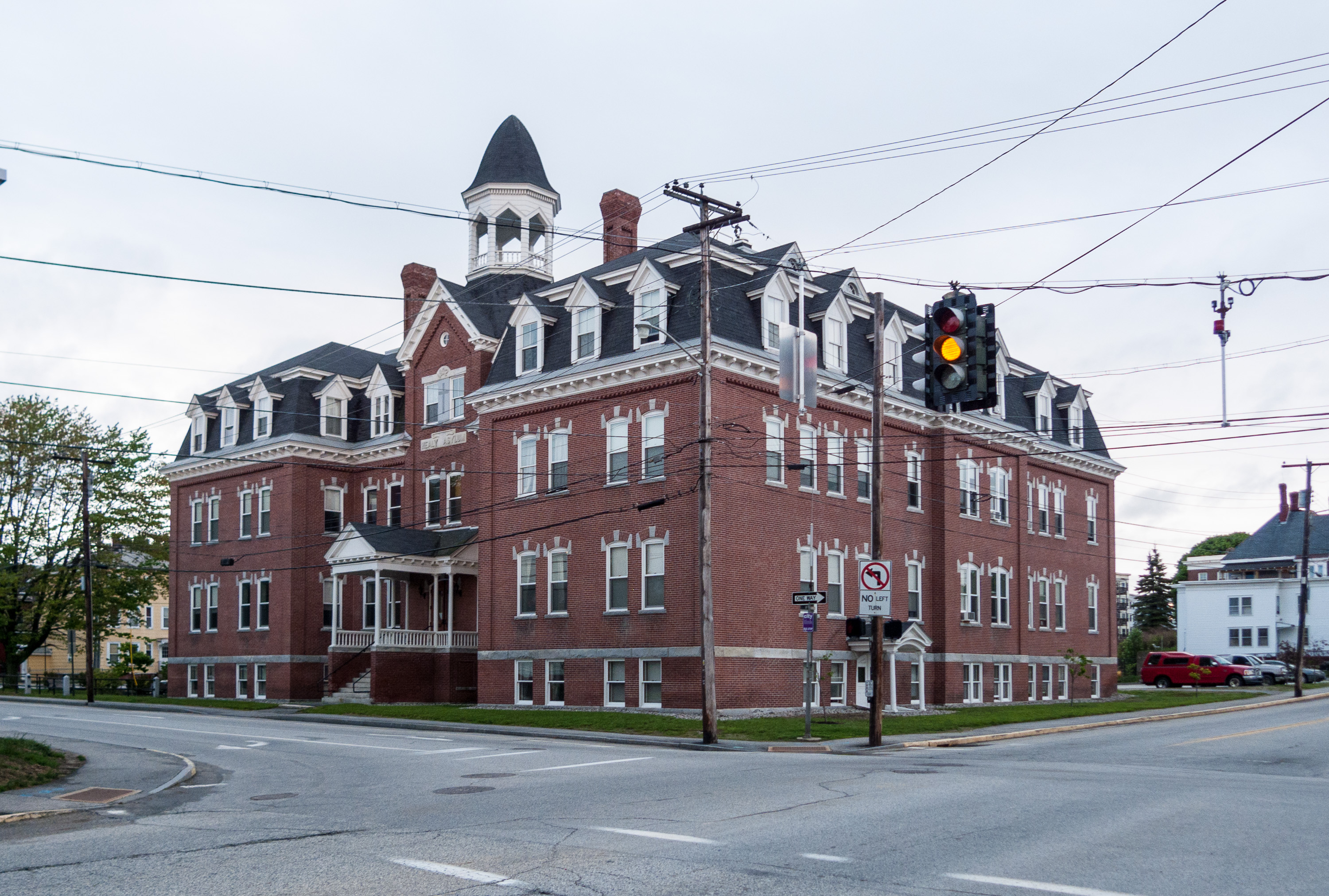
Healy Asylum, Lewiston, Maine, 1892–93.

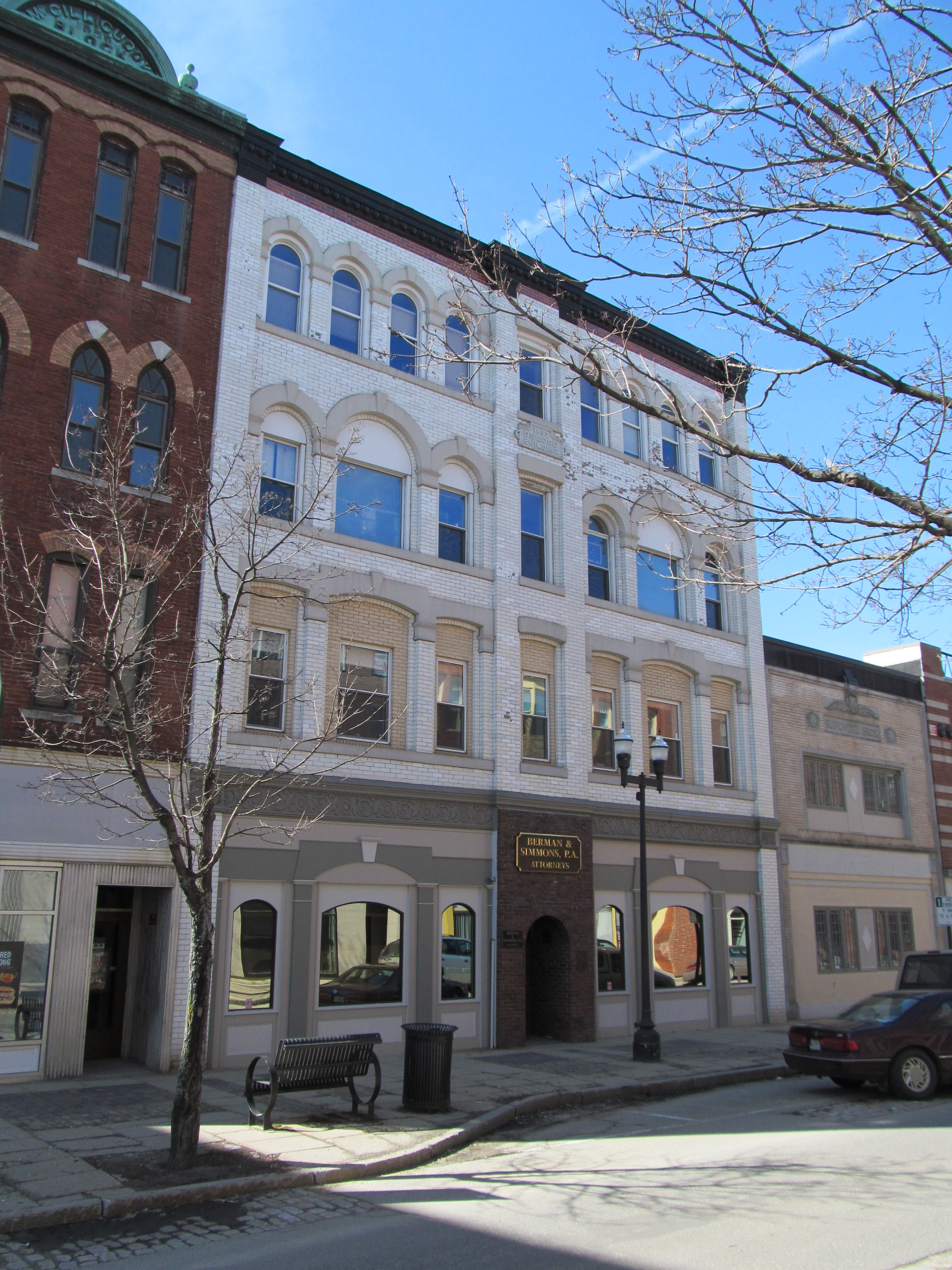
Osgood Building, Lewiston, Maine, 1893.

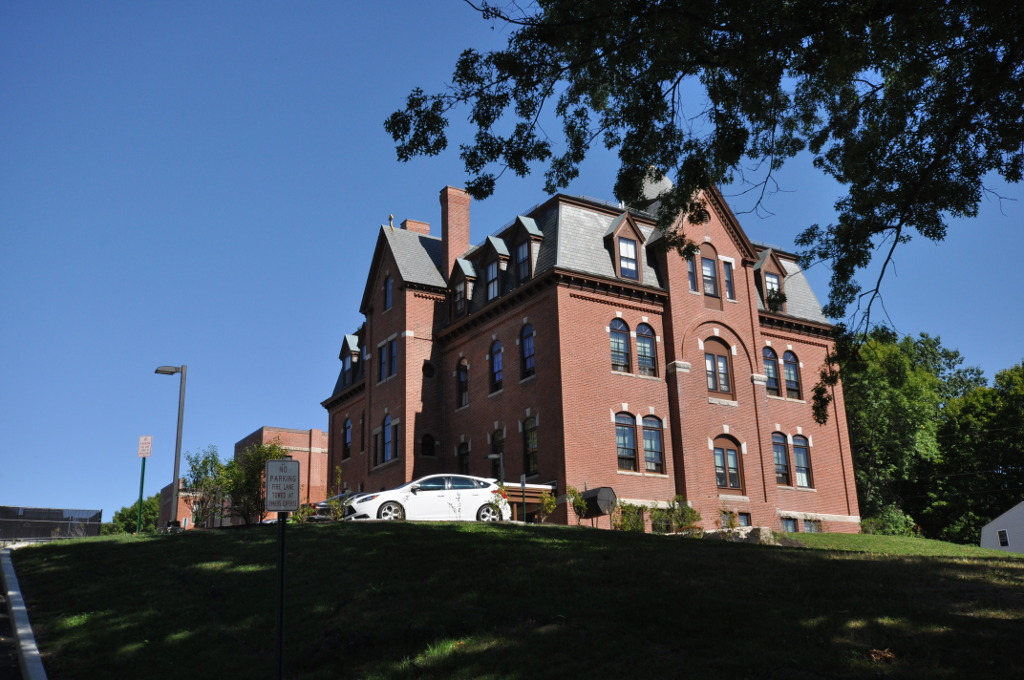
St. Hyacinth School, Westbrook, Maine, 1893–94.

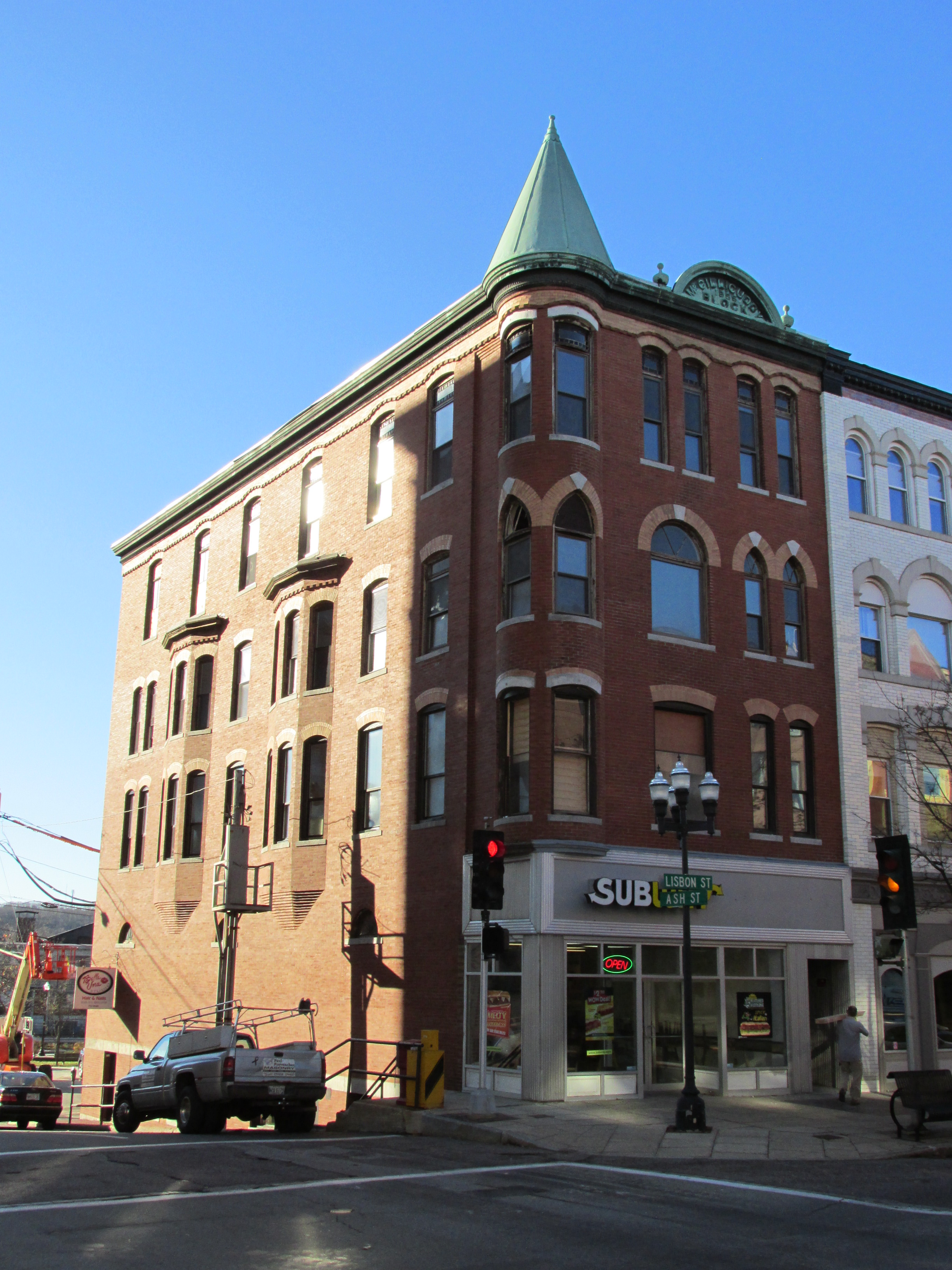
First McGillicuddy Block, Lewiston, Maine, 1895.

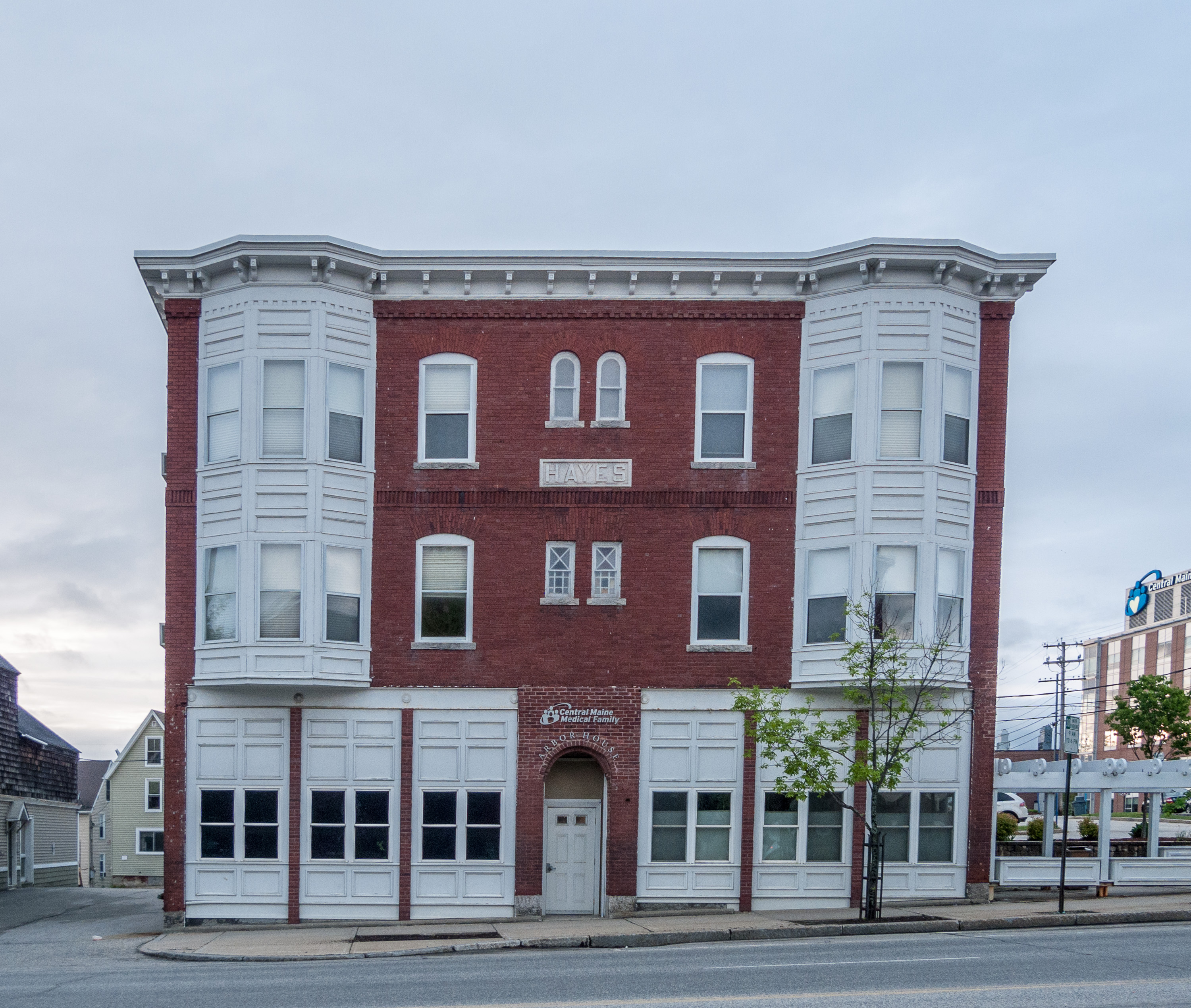
Hayes Block, Lewiston, Maine, 1897.
