= Garcelon =

Garcelon is a surname. Notable people with the surname include:

- Alonzo Garcelon (1813–1906), 36th Governor of Maine, US
- A. A. Garcelon House, historic house in Auburn, Maine
- Garcelon Field, outdoor stadium at Bates College, Lewiston, Maine
- William F. Garcelon (1868–1949), American college football player, athlete and coach

== See also ==
- Garcelon Civic Centre, sporting facility in St. Stephen, New Brunswick, Canada
