= Camden International Film Festival =

Annual film festival in Camden, Maine

- Location: Camden, Maine
- Founded: 2005
- Most recent: September 17–20, 2026
- Website: pointsnorthinstitute.org/ciff/

The Camden International Film Festival, stylized as CIFF, is an annual documentary film festival based in Camden, Rockport, and Rockland, Maine, in the United States that takes place mid-September.

Founded in 2005 by Ben Fowlie and operated since 2016 by the Points North Institute, the festival highlights craft and innovation within nonfiction storytelling. In addition, CIFF hosts the annual Points North Forum, a two-day conference that provides documentary filmmakers with opportunities for professional development and creative inspiration. Past participants include representatives from A24, HBO, A&E, the BBC, CNN, Discovery, Arte, Vimeo, the Tribeca Film Institute, the Sundance Institute, and POV.

The festival screens approximately 60 documentary features and shorts annually. Screenings are followed by Q&A sessions with directors and industry professionals. Festivities over the weekend also include a course through the University of Maine, panels, workshops and parties.

In addition to the main festival in September, the Points North Institute operates two mini-festivals: CIFF Summer Party and Cabin Fever.

== History ==
CIFF was established by Ben Fowlie, a native of Camden and a graduate of Emerson College, where he earned a degree in filmmaking. He had returned to Camden after college, believing the presence of organizations like the Maine Media Workshops, Farnsworth Art Museum and Center for Maine Contemporary Art demonstrated a regional commitment to the arts. However, there was little specifically dedicated to cinema (at the time, Maine Media was best known for its photojournalism), so Fowlie created the festival.

CIFF received its first grant from the Academy of Motion Picture Arts and Sciences in 2013 to support two programs in that year's festival. Then and Now paired classic documentary films with new work from emerging non-fiction filmmakers. Process was a curated line-up of documentaries from the past and present. The festival received a second grant from the Academy for the 2015 edition to support Being There, a retrospective program and workshop series focused on the past, present and future of ethnographic documentary film.

In 2015, CIFF formed a partnership with the Tribeca Film Institute (TFI) and launched the Camden/TFI Retreat. The retreat ran annually for six days each summer in Camden and Rockport, Maine, offering five U.S.-based documentary filmmaking teams professional guidance and mentorship. The retreat was suspended in 2020 when TFI paused all of its programming in the wake of the COVID-19 pandemic.

The Points North Institute was established in 2016 to act as the umbrella institution for the festival as well as its other programs, like the Camden/TFI Retreat, the Points North Fellowship, and other artist development initiatives.

Also in 2016, CIFF was named an Academy Awards qualifying festival for the Documentary Short Film Award by the Academy of Motion Picture Arts and Sciences. Short films that receive the festival's Best Documentary Short Award qualify to enter the Oscars competition in the same category. CIFF organizers also launched the Points North Institute that year, as an umbrella organization for the festival and other programs.

In 2020, CIFF was presented online as a virtual festival due to the COVID-19 pandemic. In addition to all films screening virtually, the festival screened part of the film line-up at a drive-in theater organizers constructed in Rockport. For the 2021, 2022 and 2023 editions, the festival took place in hybrid format with both in-person and online screenings.

In 2024, CIFF founder Ben Fowlie stepped down as executive and artistic director of the Points North Institute. Rick Rector, a board member of the institute, was appointed interim executive director. Sean Flynn, a co-founder of Points North Institute with Fowlie and Caroline von Kuhn who continues to lead the institute's artist programs, expanded his role to oversee CIFF.

== Venues ==
The festival takes place at venues around the Midcoast area. Shuttles are often utilized to bring guests between venues, which are spread out over multiple communities. The Camden Opera House is considered one of the primary venues of the festival, though in recent years much of the programming has moved to the Strand Theatre in Rockland. Other venues that CIFF has utilized include the Farnsworth Art Museum and the Rockport Opera House. A custom-built drive-in cinema hosted the festival in 2020.
