= St. Hyacinth School and Convent =

- U.S. National Register of Historic Places
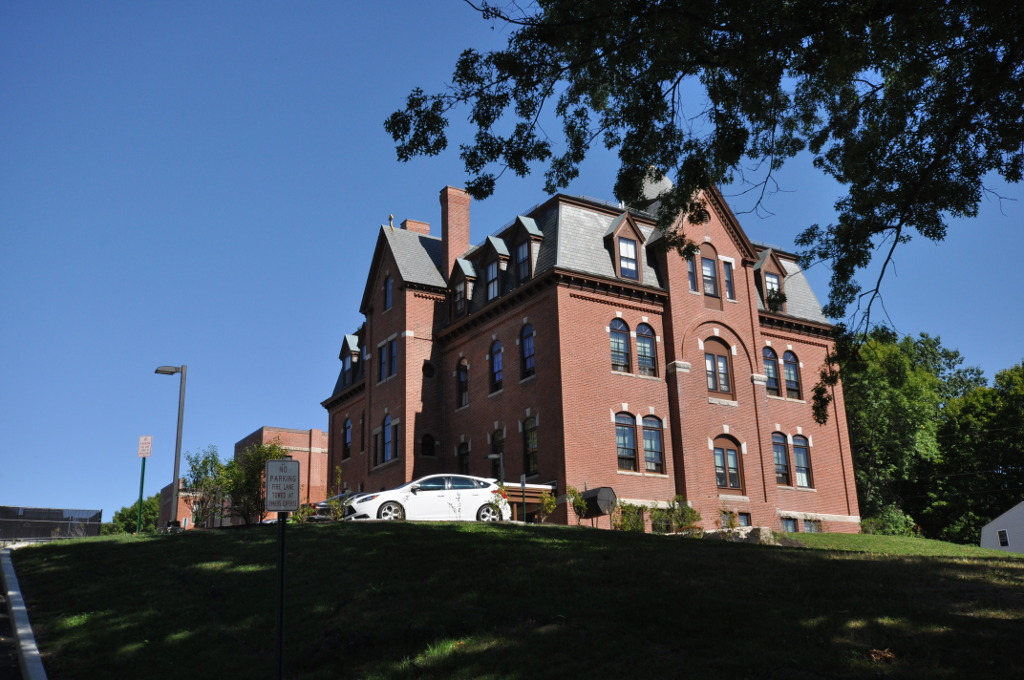

- Location within Maine Location within the United States
- Location: 2 Walker St., Westbrook, Maine
- Coordinates: 43°40′49″N 70°21′55″W
- Area: less than one acre
- Built: 1894
- Architect: Jefferson L. Coburn & Sons; O'Connell & Shaw
- Architectural style: Second Empire; Late Gothic Revival
- NRHP reference No.: 13000439
- Added to NRHP: June 25, 2013

The St. Hyacinth School and Convent are a pair of religious and educational buildings at 2 Walker Street in Westbrook, Maine. The school, built in 1894, is a fine local example of Second Empire design, and the 1922 convent is a good example of Gothic Revival architecture. Both were built by the local Roman Catholic parish of St. Hyacinth to support the burgeoning French-Canadian and French-American community, many of whom worked in the local mills. The buildings were listed on the National Register of Historic Places in 2013. Both have been converted into residential housing.

== Description and history ==
The St. Hyachinth School and Convent are located on Westbrook's north side, on the west side of Walker Street between Pike and Brown Streets. The school is the southerly of the two; it is a 3 1/2-story red-brick building with a mansard roof, granite trim and foundation, and projecting gabled pavilions. The roof is studded with gabled dormers, and its eave is lined with large wooden brackets. It is topped by an open octagonal cupola with a slightly curved pyramidal roof. The convent is a three-story H-shaped brick building, with stone foundation, belt courses, and window sills. Its entrance is a wide double door set a slightly pointed arched opening with quoined sides.

The parish of St. Hyacinth was established in the 1870s, to serve the large number of French Canadians who came to Westbrook to work in its mills. The school building was built in 1893–1894, to a design by Jefferson L. Coburn & Sons of Lewiston, and originally also housed the convent of the nuns who taught there. Continued growth of the parish prompted the construction of the adjacent convent (with the conversion of the entire first building to a school) in 1922, to a design by O'Connell & Shaw of Boston, Massachusetts. Classes at the school were taught in French and English, but by the 1950s French immigration had ended, and many of the parish's culturally French participants now spoke English. Enrollment declined, and the school closed in 1974. Both buildings have now been converted into conventional residential housing.

== See also ==
- National Register of Historic Places listings in Cumberland County, Maine
