= James C. Lord House =

Historic house in Maine, United States

- U.S. National Register of Historic Places
- U.S. Historic district – Contributing property
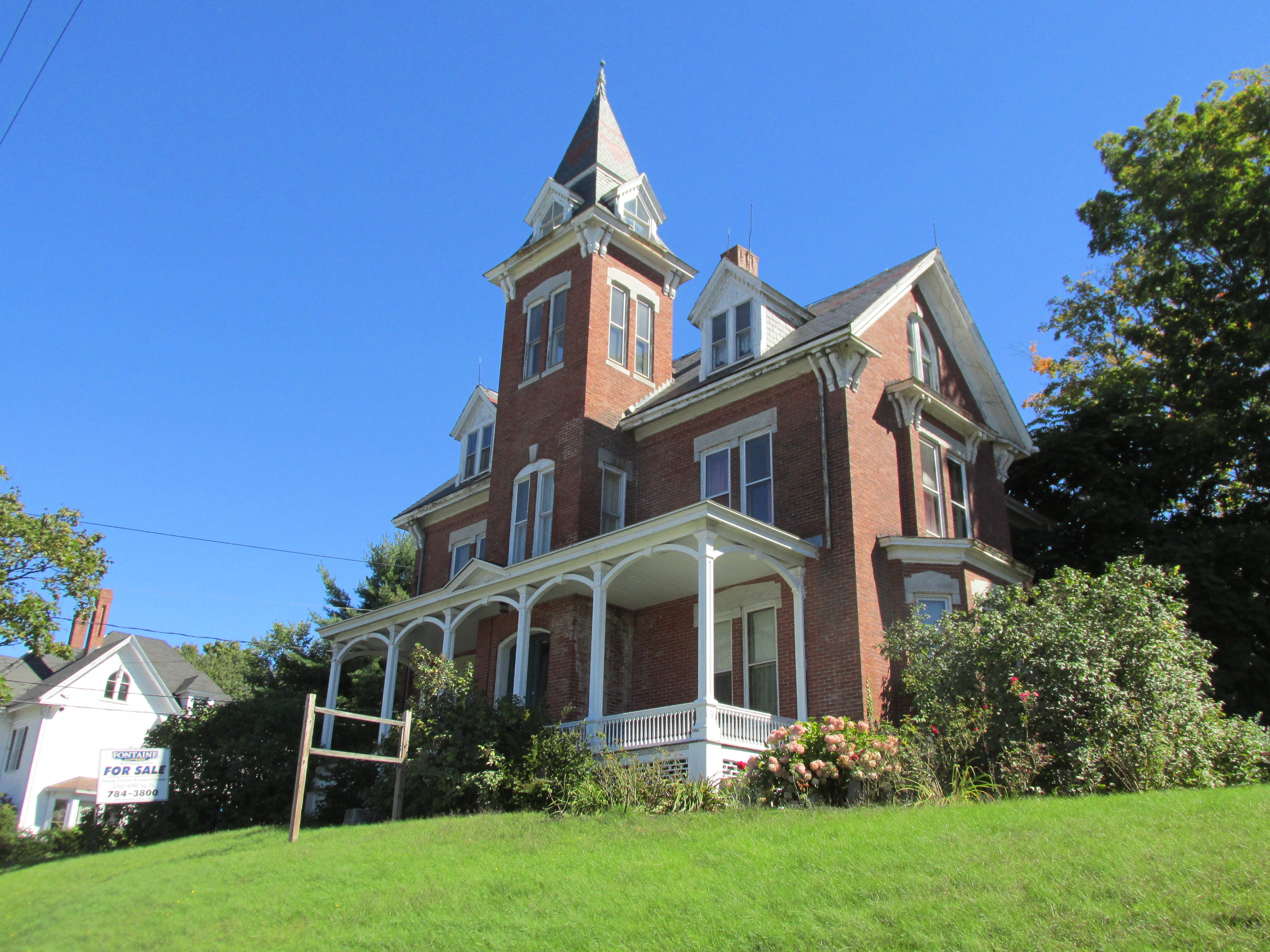
- James C. Lord House

- Location within Maine Location within the United States
- Location: 497 Main Street, Lewiston, Maine
- Coordinates: 44°6′31″N 70°12′33″W
- Built: 1885
- Architect: Jefferson L. Coburn
- Architectural style: Italianate, Queen Anne
- Part of: Main Street–Frye Street Historic District (ID08001355)
- NRHP reference No.: 78000158

Significant dates
- Added to NRHP: July 21, 1978
- Designated CP: January 23, 2009

The James C. Lord House is a historic house in Lewiston, Maine. Built in 1885 for a prominent local businessman, it is a high quality blend of late 19th-century architectural styles. It was listed on the National Register of Historic Places in 1978.

== Description and history ==
The Lord House stands north of downtown Lewiston, on a slight rise at the southeast corner of Main Street (United States Route 202 and Maine State Route 100). It is a 2 1/2-story masonry structure, built out of red brick with granite trim. The house is roughly T-shaped, with a polychrome slate roof that is gabled in the side ends and hipped at the rear. The roof is pierced on several elevations by gabled dormers, and a three-story tower projects from the front, capped by a pyramidal roof. A single-story porch extends across the full width of the front; it has square posts rising to arched openings, with low balustrades between. Windows have granite sills and lintels, and there are paired brackets in the corners of the eaves. A period carriage house, also built of brick, stands behind the house.

The house was built in 1885 to a design by Jefferson L. Coburn, a local architect from whom only a few designs are known. Its massing is typical of the Queen Anne style, but its design includes elements of Gothic, Italianate, and Stick styles. The house was built for James C. Lord, a prominent local business man who operated a dry goods business at 379 Lisbon Street. The house was purchased in 1920 by Timothy Callahan, a prominent local politician.

== See also ==
- National Register of Historic Places listings in Androscoggin County, Maine
