= Camden Opera House Block =

Historic building in Camden, Maine, US

- U.S. National Register of Historic Places
- U.S. Historic district – Contributing property
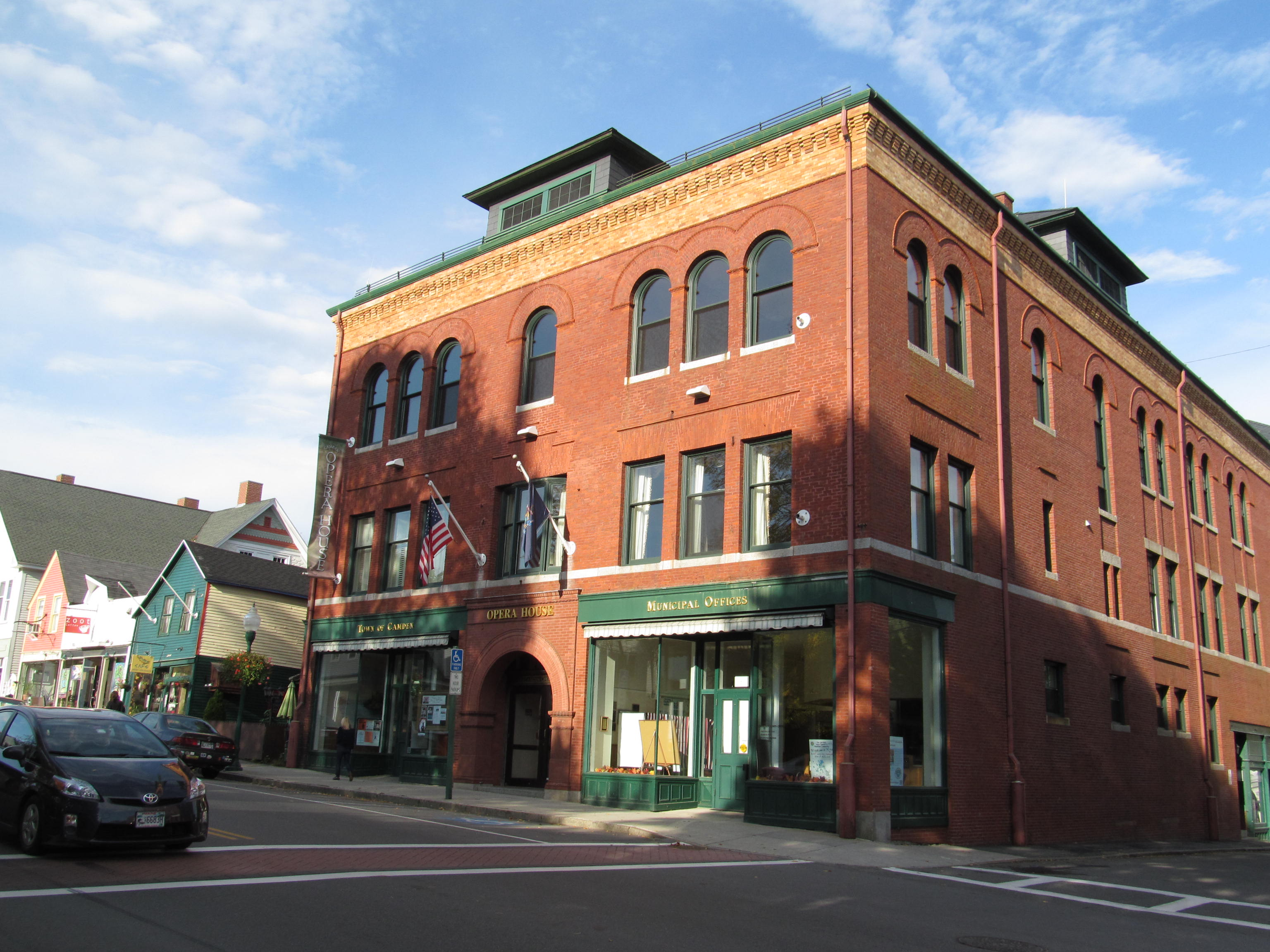
- The Opera House Block, October 2012

- Location within Maine Location within the United States
- Location: 29 Elm Street; Camden, Maine; United States
- Coordinates: 44°12′32″N 69°4′1″W
- Area: less than one acre
- Built: 1893
- Architect: Elmer I. Thomas (1893), E. Leander Higgins (1932)
- Part of: Camden Great Fire Historic District (ID86003539)
- NRHP reference No.: 86003539

Significant dates
- Added to NRHP: December 29, 1986
- Designated CP: December 29, 1986

The Camden Opera House Block is a historic multifunction building at 29 Elm Street in the center of Camden, Maine, United States. Built in 1893 after the town's great 1892 fire, it is one of the town's most prominent buildings. It houses town offices, a social meeting hall, and a 500-seat theater. The building was listed on the National Register of Historic Places in 1986.

== Description and history ==
The Camden Opera House Block is located near the southern end of Camden's downtown business district, opposite the town common on the southwest corner of Washington and Elm Streets, and within the Camden Great Fire Historic District. It is a rectangular brick three-story structure, with storefronts (now mostly occupied by town offices) on the ground floor, the theater and meeting spaces on the second floor, and a large social hall on the third floor. The exterior styling is Romanesque, with round-arch windows on the third floor of both street-facing facades, and the main entrance recessed in a round-arch opening on the Elm Street facade.

On November 19, 1892, a fire swept through downtown Camden, destroying a large number of wood-frame commercial structures, including the town offices, numerous fraternal meeting facilities, and the town's opera house. The Opera House was one of the most prominent buildings constructed in the wake of the fire, designed by Lewiston architect Elmer I. Thomas and completed in 1893. The building was designed to house not just town offices and the theater, but meeting spaces for local business organizations and the local post office, as well as two retail storefronts. In 1932, the former post office space, facing Washington Street, was remodeled to serve as Camden town offices. This renovation, which included a new Colonial Revival facade, was designed by Portland architect E. Leander Higgins. Since that time, the town has expanded into other parts of the building. The theater is used for town meetings, local productions of all types, and is one of the host sites of the Camden International Film Festival.

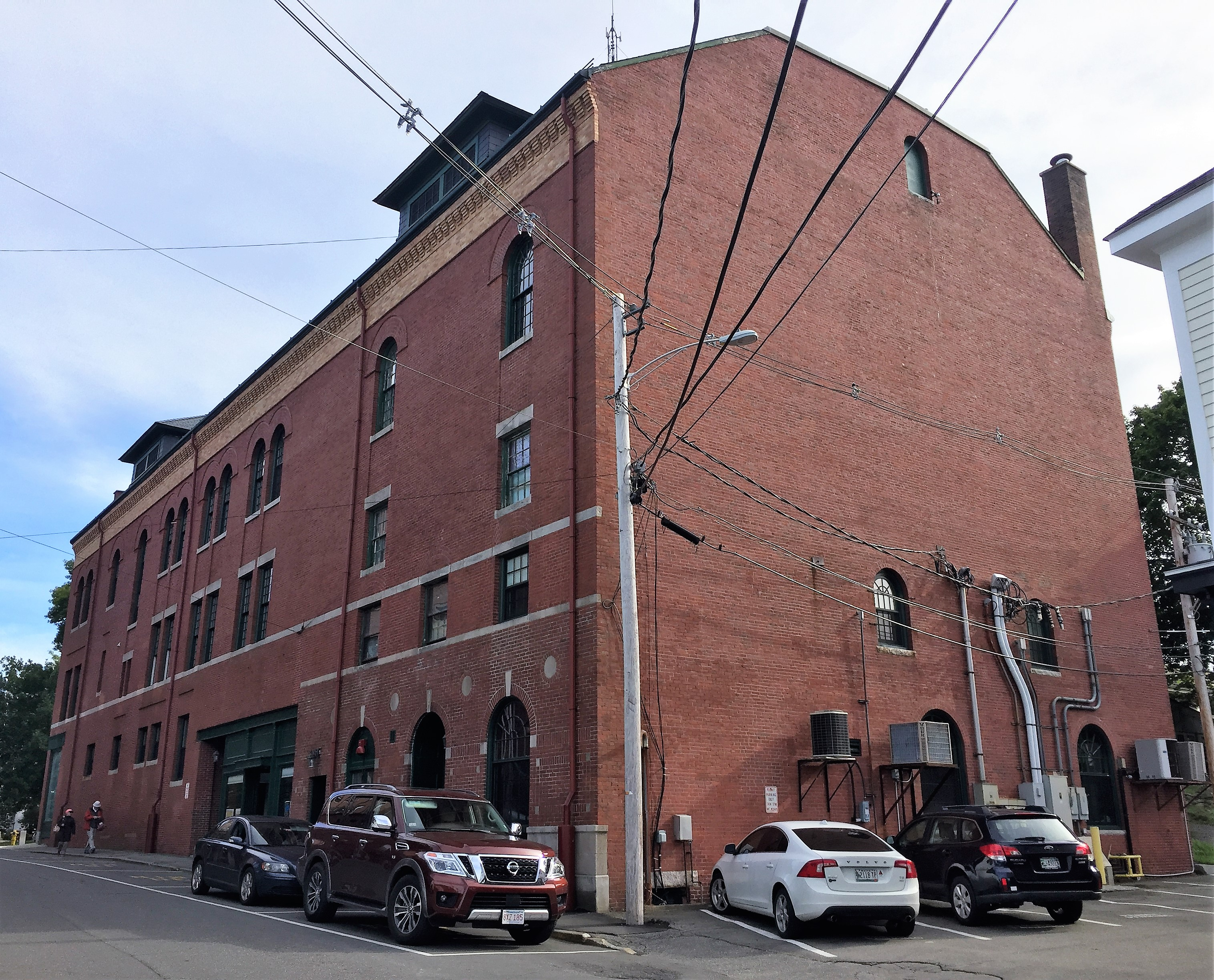
Rear of the Opera House Block, showing the former town office, September 2018

== See also ==
- National Register of Historic Places listings in Knox County, Maine
