= Lord Block =

- U.S. National Register of Historic Places
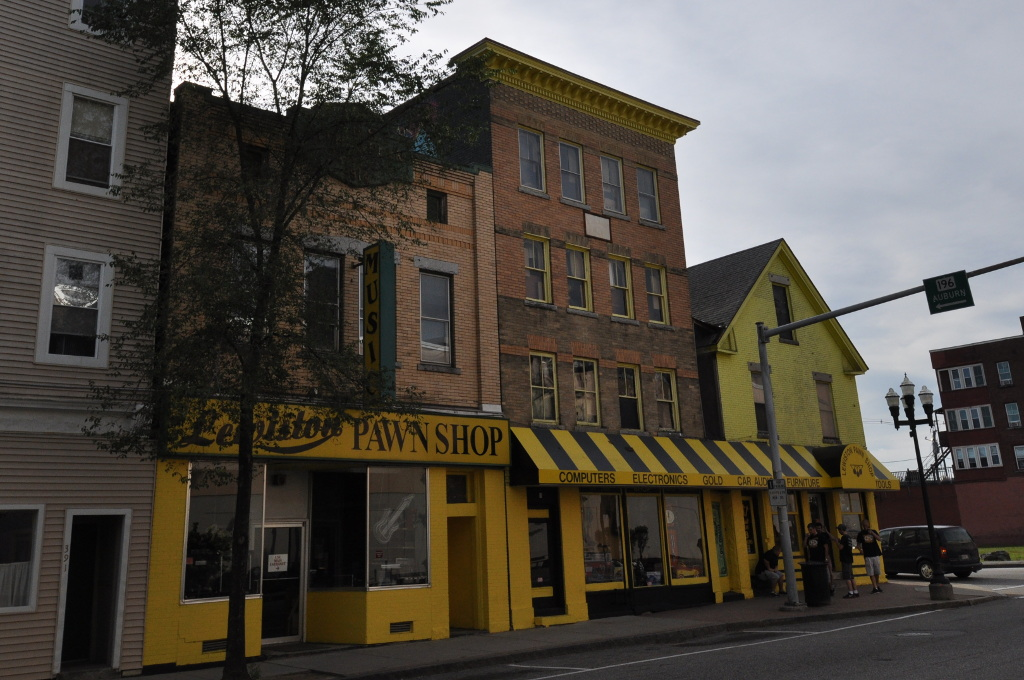
- The Lord Block is the rightmost building in this photo

- Location within Maine Location within the United States
- Location: 379 Lisbon Street, Lewiston, Maine
- Coordinates: 44°5′32″N 70°12′55″W
- Area: less than one acre
- Built: 1865
- Architectural style: Greek Revival
- MPS: Lewiston Commercial District MRA
- NRHP reference No.: 86002284
- Added to NRHP: April 25, 1986

The Lord Block is a historic commercial building in downtown Lewiston, Maine. Built in 1865, it is one of downtown Lewiston's oldest commercial buildings, and a reminder of the city's early commercial character. The building was listed on the National Register of Historic Places in 1986.

== Description and history ==
The Lord Block is located on the southern half of Lisbon Street, Lewiston's main business district, at the southwest corner of Lisbon and Cedar Streets. It is a 2-1/2 story masonry structure, built out of load-bearing brick with granite trim, with a front-facing gable roof that has a cross gable on the north side. The front has two virtually identical storefronts, each with a recessed entrance on the left and a plate glass display window to the right. The doors and windows are separated by rusticated granite piers, with a modern awning now extending across both storefronts and on to the adjacent building. Upper floor and side facade windows are sash windows set in rectangular openings, with granite sills and lintels. The north-facing gable is finished in decorative cut shingles, and has two window bays.

The building was constructed in 1865 for James C. and Rufus Lord, dealers in "provisions", and was probably one of the first commercial businesses on the southern stretch of Lisbon Street, near the mills. Its deed restrictions limited its height, and required masonry construction. The store was apparently successful: James Lord was able to build an elaborate house on Main Street in 1885.

== See also ==
- National Register of Historic Places listings in Androscoggin County, Maine
