= Atkinson Building =

- U.S. National Register of Historic Places
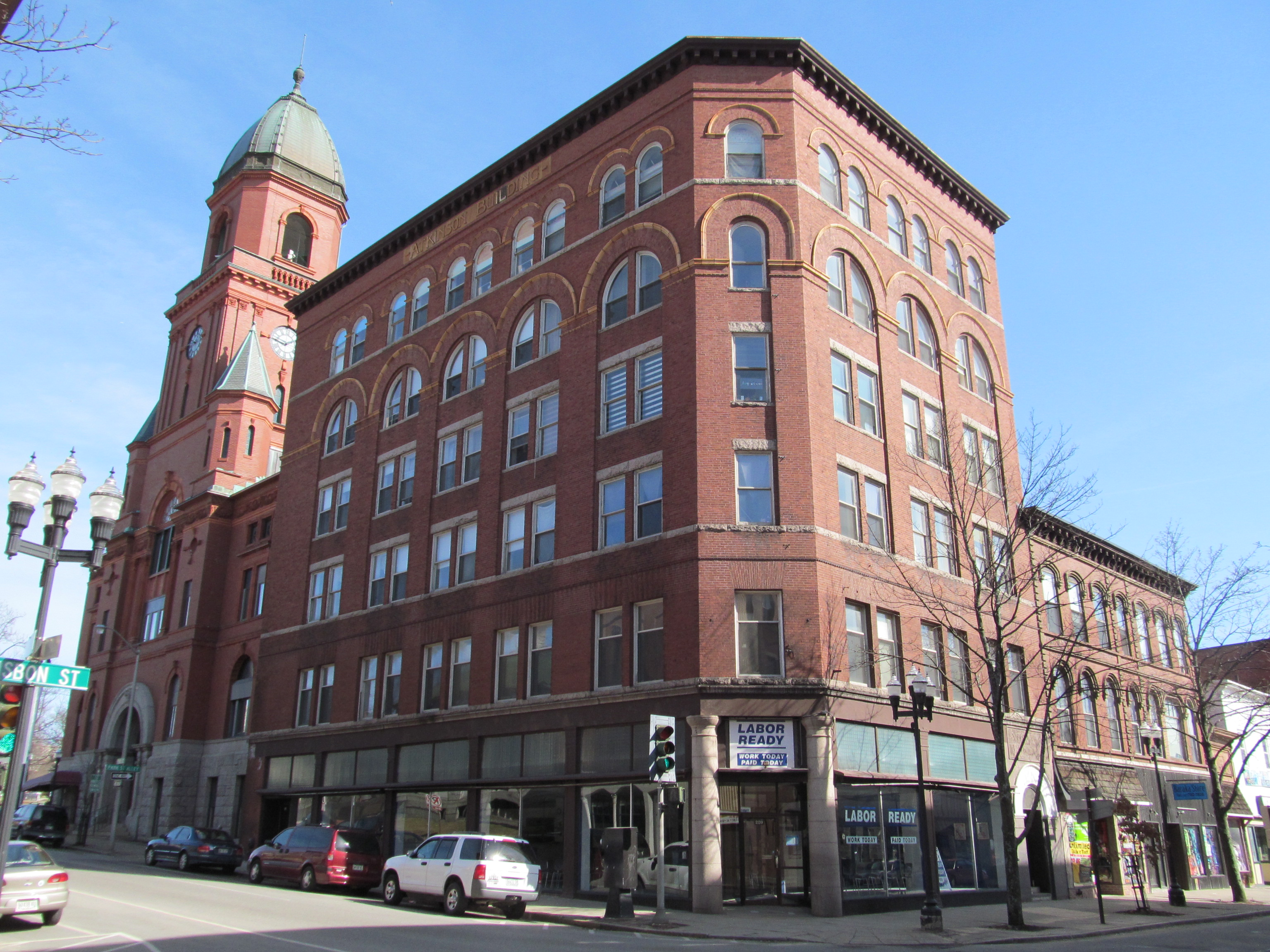

- Location within Maine Location within the United States
- Location: 220 Lisbon Street, Lewiston, Maine
- Coordinates: 44°5′41″N 70°13′0″W
- Built: 1892
- Architect: Elmer I. Thomas
- Architectural style: Romanesque
- NRHP reference No.: 83000444
- Added to NRHP: February 2, 1983

The Atkinson Building is an historic commercial building at 220 Lisbon Street in Lewiston, Maine, United States. Erected in 1892, the six-story Romanesque style building was the tallest in the city at the time, and is still an imposing presence in the city's central business district. It was designed by Auburn architect Elmer I. Thomas to harmonize with the adjacent Lewiston City Hall (built 1890-92), and is one of its finest Victorian commercial buildings. It was listed on the National Register of Historic Places in 1983.

== Description and history ==
The Atkinson Building is set at the eastern corner of Lisbon and Pine Streets in the heart of Lewiston's central business district. It occupies one-half of a lot on which the city's first city hall stood until destroyed by fire in 1890; the present City Hall was built on the other half of the lot in 1890-92. The six-story brick and stone structure presents five bays on Pine Street, three on Lisbon Street, and one angled at the corner. The principal ground floor commercial space, originally occupied by the Atkinson Home Furnishings Company, was entered via an entrance at the corner, and took up two bays on Lisbon and three on Pine Street, which are filled with plate glass windows. The third bay on Lisbon houses an entrance giving access to the upper floors, while the remaining bays on Pine Street house, which originally housed another doorway and a pair of small windows, have been replaced by plate glass, expanding the ground-floor retail space.

A granite course separates the first and second levels. The second level bays are filled with pairs of sash windows, except the corner bay, which has a single window, and are topped by a band of brick and another granite course. The third and fourth levels repeat the arrangement of windows, with granite lintels topping each window. The fifth level windows are set in pairs in Romanesque arches, an echo of the Romanesque entrance arch to City Hall on Pine Street. The single window in the corner bay has a round-arch top. The arches are outlined in terra cotta, as are the pilaster-like piers which separate the window pairs. After another granite string course, the top level has the paired windows set in double arches, also outlined in terra cotta. The building's bricks are reddish in color, the terra cotta a lighter rust color, and the granite has a pink-red hue, and was selected from the same quarry in North Conway, New Hampshire that supplied granite for City Hall.

== See also ==
- National Register of Historic Places listings in Androscoggin County, Maine
