= First McGillicuddy Block =

- U.S. National Register of Historic Places
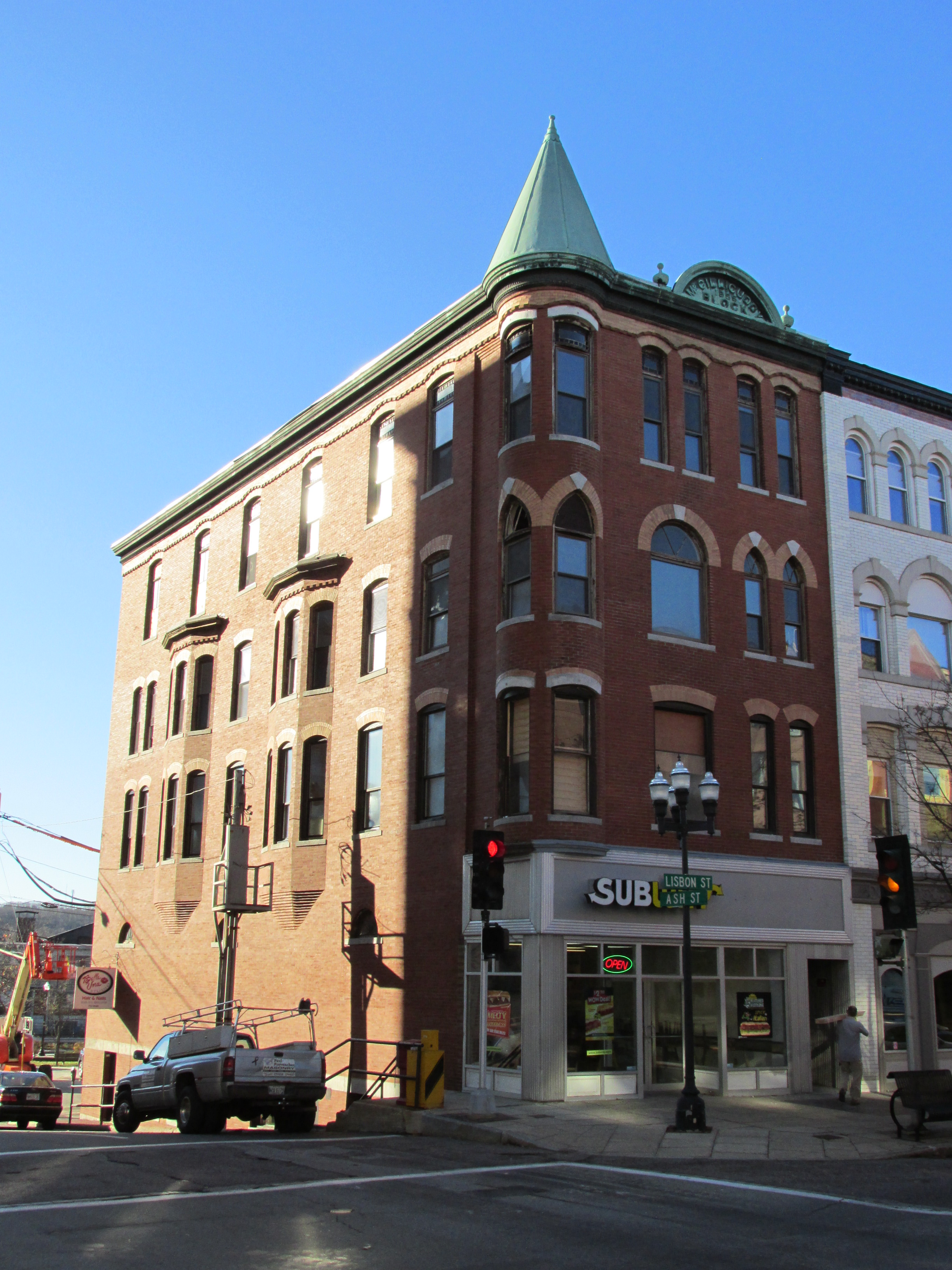
- First McGillicuddy Block

- Location within Maine Location within the United States
- Location: Lewiston, Maine
- Coordinates: 44°5′47″N 70°13′4″W
- Built: 1895
- Architect: Jefferson L. Coburn & Sons
- MPS: Lewiston Commercial District MRA
- NRHP reference No.: 86002281
- Added to NRHP: April 25, 1986

The First McGillicuddy Block is an historic commercial building at 133 Lisbon Street in Lewiston, Maine. The block was built in 1895 by Daniel J. McGillicuddy, and is one of two surviving local examples of the work of local architect Jefferson Coburn. The block, a fine example of late Victorian architecture, was added to the National Register of Historic Places in 1986.

== Description and history ==
The First MicGillicuddy Block is located at the northwest corner of Lisbon and Ash Streets, occupying a prominent position on Lewiston's principal downtown street. It is a four-story brick structure, trimmed with metal and stone. Its main facade faces Lisbon Street, and is three bays wide, the corner bay rounded at the upper levels and capped by a conical roof. Windows are varied, including large round-arch and segmented-arch windows, and paired narrow windows, all with arches highlighted by orange brick voussoirs and granite keystones. An orange brick beltcourse lies just below the pressed metal cornice of the roof. The ground floor storefront is modern. The Ash Street facade is less ornate, but has two oriel window bays, two stories in height, at the second and third floors.

The building was designed by Jefferson L. Coburn & Sons, noted local architects who also designed the adjacent Osgood Building. It was built for Daniel J. McGillicuddy, a prominent local lawyer, who had served in the state legislature and as mayor of Lewiston, and later served in the United States Congress.

== See also ==
- National Register of Historic Places listings in Androscoggin County, Maine
