= Healy Asylum =

- U.S. National Register of Historic Places
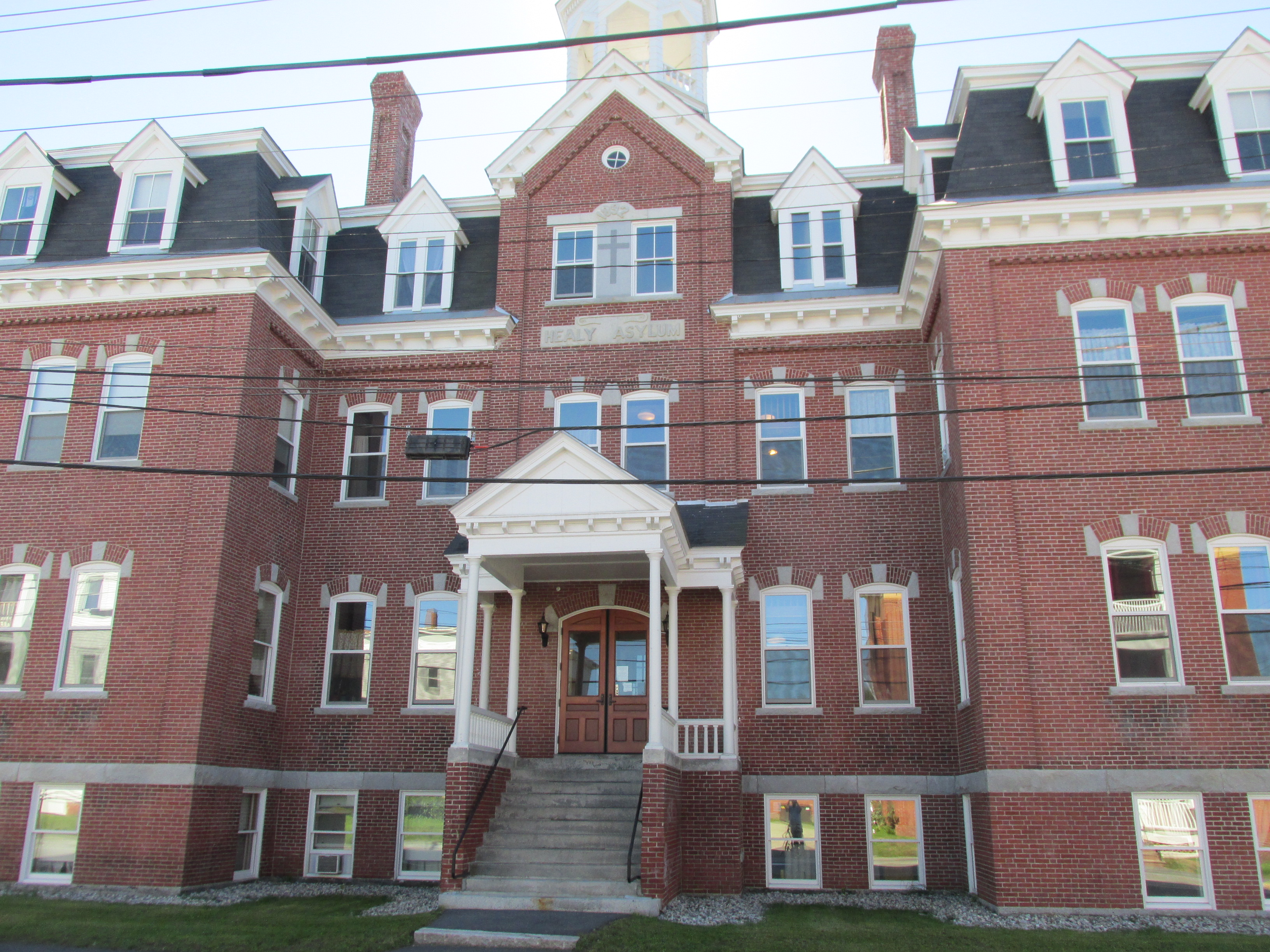
- Healy Asylum

- Location within Maine Location within the United States
- Location: 81 Ash Street, Lewiston, Maine
- Coordinates: 44°5′50″N 70°12′49″W
- Area: less than one acre
- Built: 1893
- Architect: Jefferson L. Coburn & Sons
- Architectural style: Second Empire
- NRHP reference No.: 79000128
- Added to NRHP: October 1, 1979

The Healy Asylum is an historic building in Lewiston, Maine. It was built in 1893 as an orphanage for boys, a role it served until about 1970. It is now known as Healy Terrace, and is used for affordable senior housing. The building was added to the National Register of Historic Places in 1979, where it is listed as Healy Asylum. It was named for Msgr. James Augustine Healy, the bishop of the Roman Catholic Diocese of Portland at the time of its construction.

== Description and history ==
The former Healy Asylum building is located facing Ash Street and occupying about 1/2 of a city block bounded by Ash, Bates, Blake, and Pine Streets, a short way east of Lewiston's downtown business district. It is a 3 1/2-story building, built out of brick with granite trim, and set on a high brick foundation. It is topped by a mansard roof pierced by gabled dormers, with chimneys topped by decorative brick corbelling. The building is H-shaped, with a central section and two flanking wings that project to the front and back. The entrance is in the center section, sheltered by a wooden portico with bracketed cornice and fully pedimented gable.

The origins of the asylum begin with the arrival in 1878 of Grey Nuns from Saint-Hyacinthe, Quebec to teach in Lewiston's parochial school, which was filled with the children of French Canadian mill workers. In 1892 the Grey Nuns decided to give up teaching, but were persuaded to take on instead an orphanage for boys, to match services they were providing for orphaned girls at their hospital. This building was built in 1893 with the approval and support of Msgr. James Augustine Healy, the bishop of the Roman Catholic Diocese of Portland, for whom it was named. The building was designed by Jefferson L. Coburn & Sons, local architects.

In addition to providing services to orphaned boys, the nuns also took on troubled youth. Funding was a regular source of friction between the nuns and the diocese, which places boys from Portland and elsewhere in the orphanage. The facility operated until 1973, and has since been converted into senior housing.

== See also ==
- National Register of Historic Places listings in Androscoggin County, Maine
