= Camden Great Fire Historic District =

Historic district in Maine, United States

- U.S. National Register of Historic Places
- U.S. Historic district
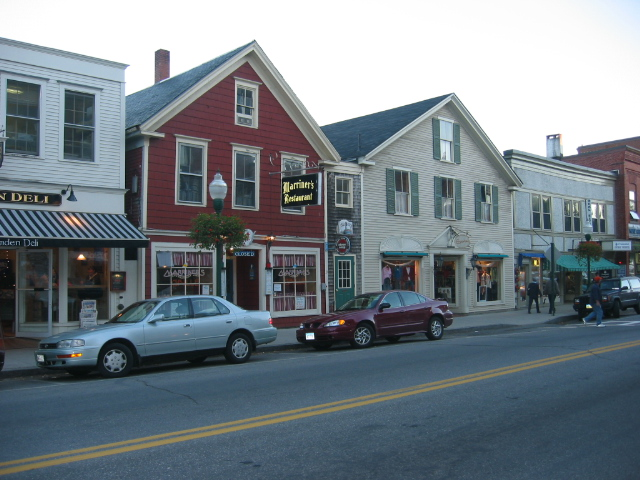
- Main Street, October 2014

- Location within Maine Location within the United States
- Location: Elm and Main Streets; Camden, Maine; United States
- Coordinates: 44.2098°N 69.0648°W
- Area: 2.3 acres (0.93 ha)
- Built: 1892
- Built by: Multiple
- Architect: Multiple
- Architectural style: Second Empire, Italianate, et al.
- NRHP reference No.: 06001221
- Added to NRHP: January 9, 2007

The Camden Great Fire Historic District encompasses a significant portion of the central business district of the town of Camden, Maine, United States. Extending from the Camden Opera House north nearly to Atlantic Avenue, the area's buildings were almost all built in 1893, following a large fire in November 1892 that swept through the area. The district was listed on the National Register of Historic Places in 2007.

== Description and history ==
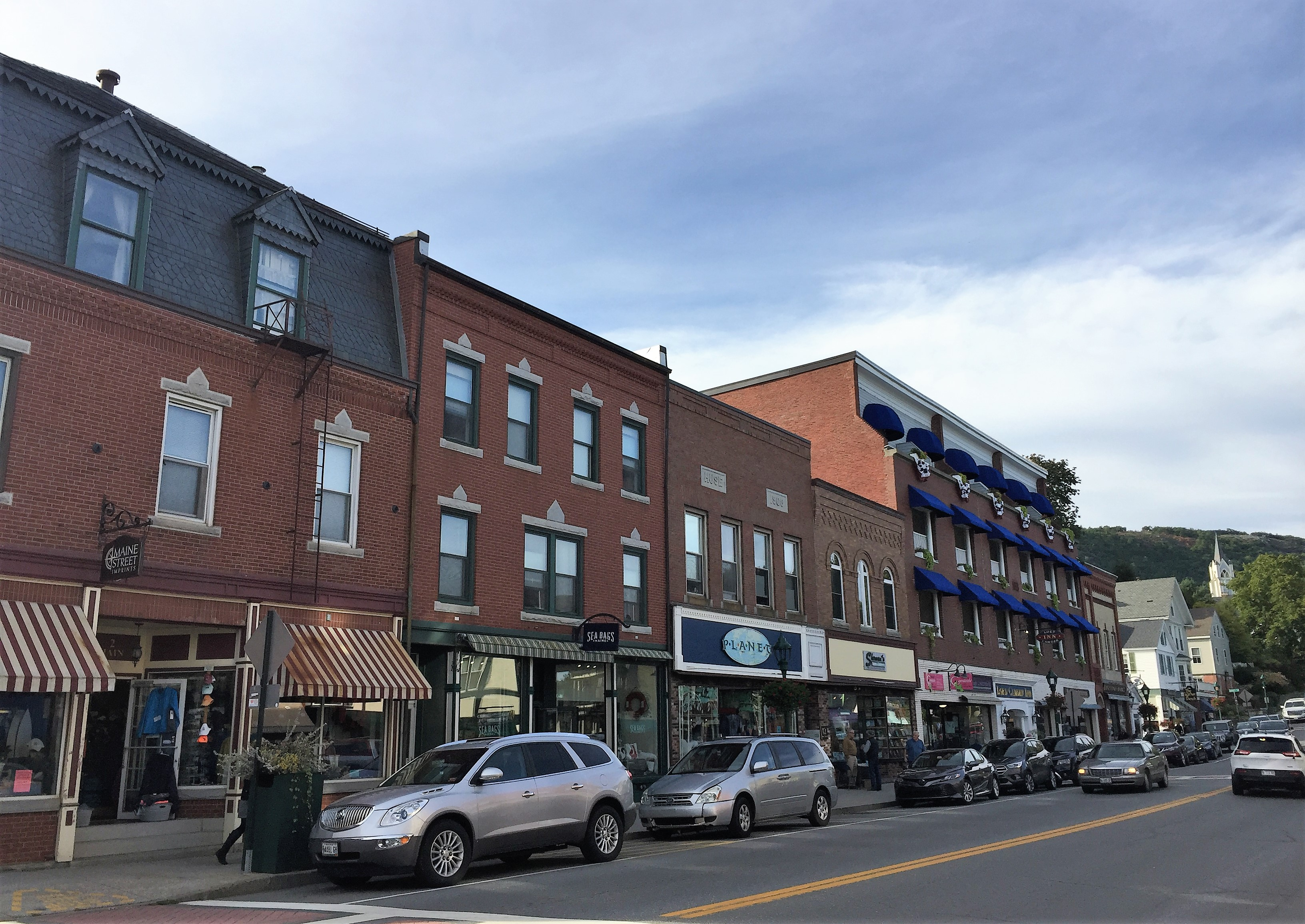
Camden Great Fire Historic District, September 2018

The town of Camden is located on the west side of Penobscot Bay in the Mid Coast area of Maine. Its town center is at the mouth of the Megunticook River, where the first English settlers established mills in 1771. The town was incorporated in 1791, and grew in the 19th century as a shipping and shipbuilding port. Its Main Street (now U.S. Route 1 [US 1]) developed in part across the dam that spans the river just above the harbor, and was lined with mainly wood frame commercial and residential buildings until 1 a.m. on November 10¸ 1892, when a fire began on the east side of Main Street. The fire swept across Main Street, destroying everything on the dam, and then moved south, across Mechanic Street, to destroy the buildings on the north side of Elm Street (the southern continuation of Main Street, also US 1), as far south as Washington Street. The fire claimed 18 residences and 40 commercial buildings, including the old opera house and social meeting halls.

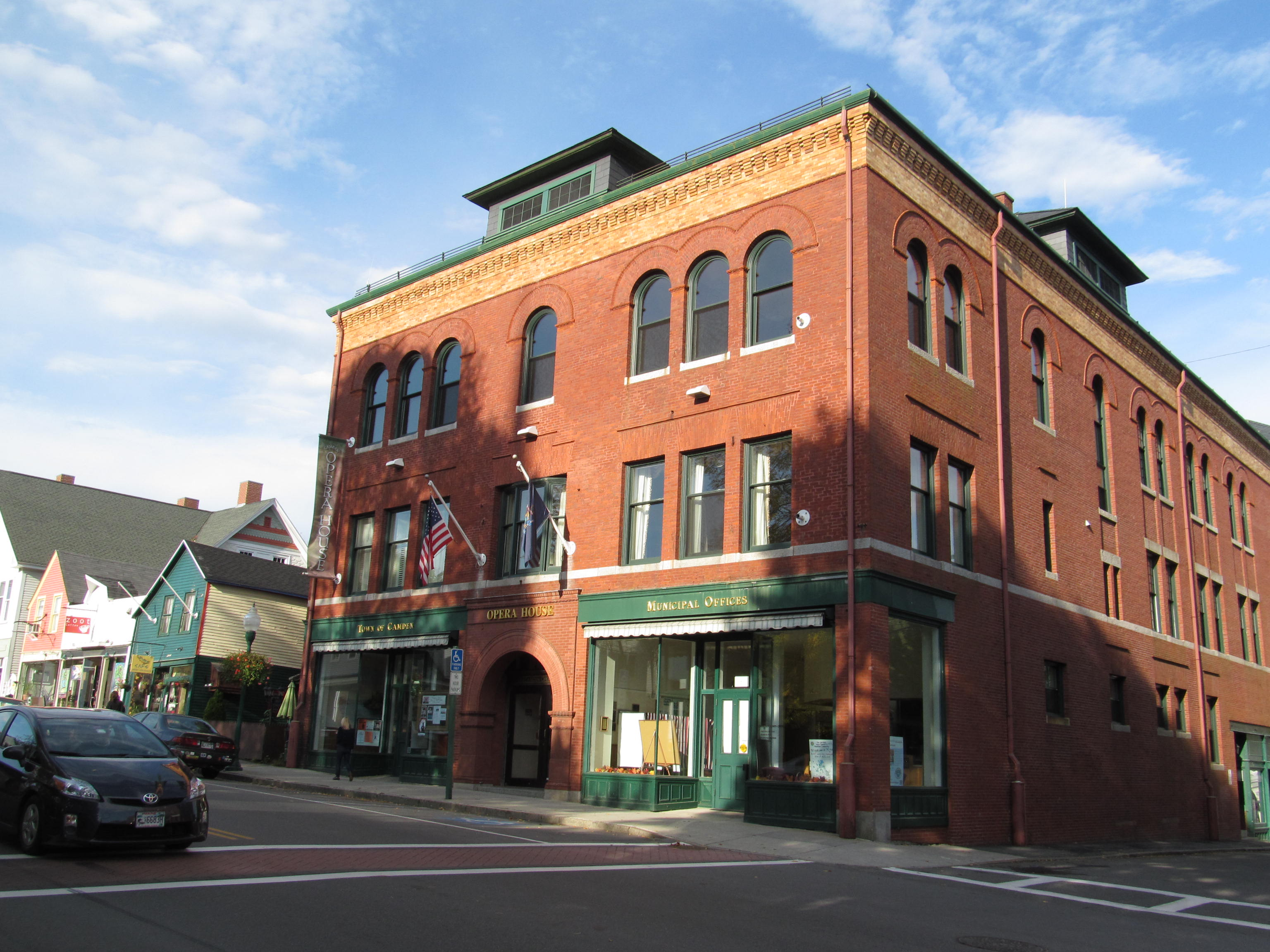
The Camden Opera House Block, October 2012

After the fire, the town enacted legislation requiring permanent new construction in the affected area to be built out of fireproof materials. As a result, most of the buildings in the area are built out of brick and stone; a few buildings located on the dam were originally intended to be temporary structures, but have never been replaced. Eighteen of the 22 buildings in the area were built in 1893, despite the global economic depression. Prominent buildings include the Masonic hall, a four-story brick building whose Romanesque features have been harmed by a modern redesign of its ground floor retail spaces, and the Camden Opera House, built on the site of the old one at Elm and Washington, which also houses town offices. The result of the rebuilding effort is a remarkably cohesive late 19th-century commercial center, which has retained much of its period charm.

== See also ==
- National Register of Historic Places listings in Knox County, Maine
