= A. A. Garcelon House =

Historic house in Maine, United States

- U.S. National Register of Historic Places
- U.S. Historic district – Contributing property
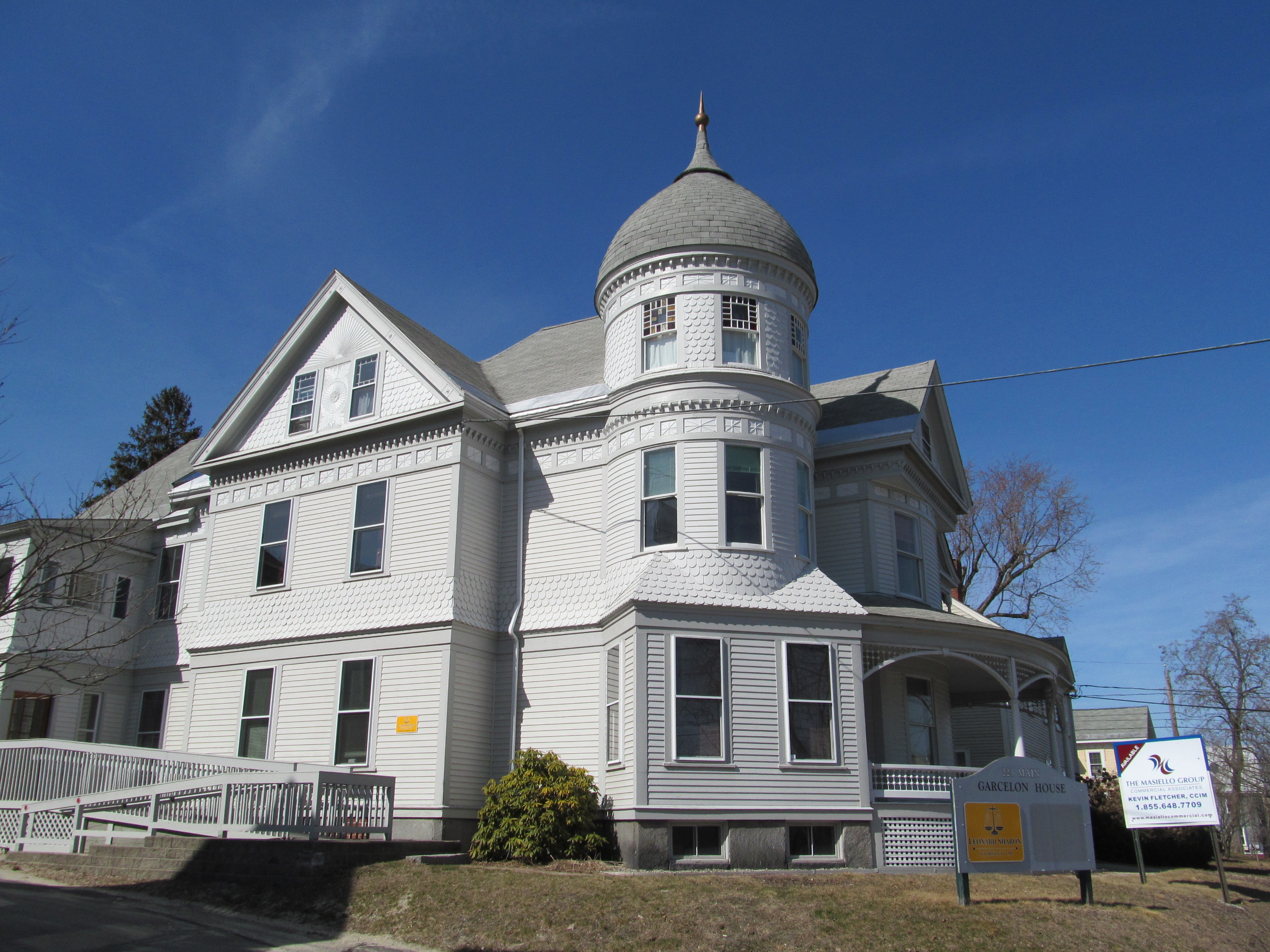

- Location within Maine Location within the United States
- Location: 223 Main Street, Auburn, Maine
- Coordinates: 44°5′38″N 70°13′36″W
- Area: 0.25 acres (0.10 ha)
- Built: 1890
- Architect: Jefferson L. Coburn & Sons
- Architectural style: Queen Anne
- Part of: Main Street Historic District (ID89000255)
- NRHP reference No.: 86001269

Significant dates
- Added to NRHP: June 13, 1986
- Designated CP: April 21, 1989

The A. A. Garcelon House is a historic house in the Main Street Historic District of Auburn, Maine. Built in 1890 for a prominent local businessman, it is an example of Queen Anne Victorian architecture. It was listed on the National Register of Historic Places on June 13, 1986.

== Description and history ==
The house stands on the west side of Main Street, south of Auburn's downtown, midway between Vine and Elm Streets. Its part of Main Street was once Auburn's most fashionable residential area. It is a 2 1/2-story wood-frame structure, with asymmetrical massing typical of the Queen Anne style. It is one of Auburn's finest Queen Anne Victorians, with projecting bay sections on its two street-facing sides and a projecting corner tower rising three stories, with a rounded roof. Bands of scallop-cut shingles separate the first and second floor and also fill the gable ends of the projecting bays. Spindle-work porches on both floors adorn the main facade. The interior of the house is largely unaltered, retaining period woodwork, including fireplace mantels and trim. A period carriage house was demolished in 1985.

The house was designed by Jefferson L. Coburn & Sons of Lewiston and built in 1890 for Arthur. A. Garcelon, a merchant of French Canadian extraction who operated a grocery supplier. Coburn was a prominent architect working in the Lewiston area during the last two decades of the 19th century.

== See also ==
- National Register of Historic Places listings in Androscoggin County, Maine
