= Osgood Building =

- U.S. National Register of Historic Places
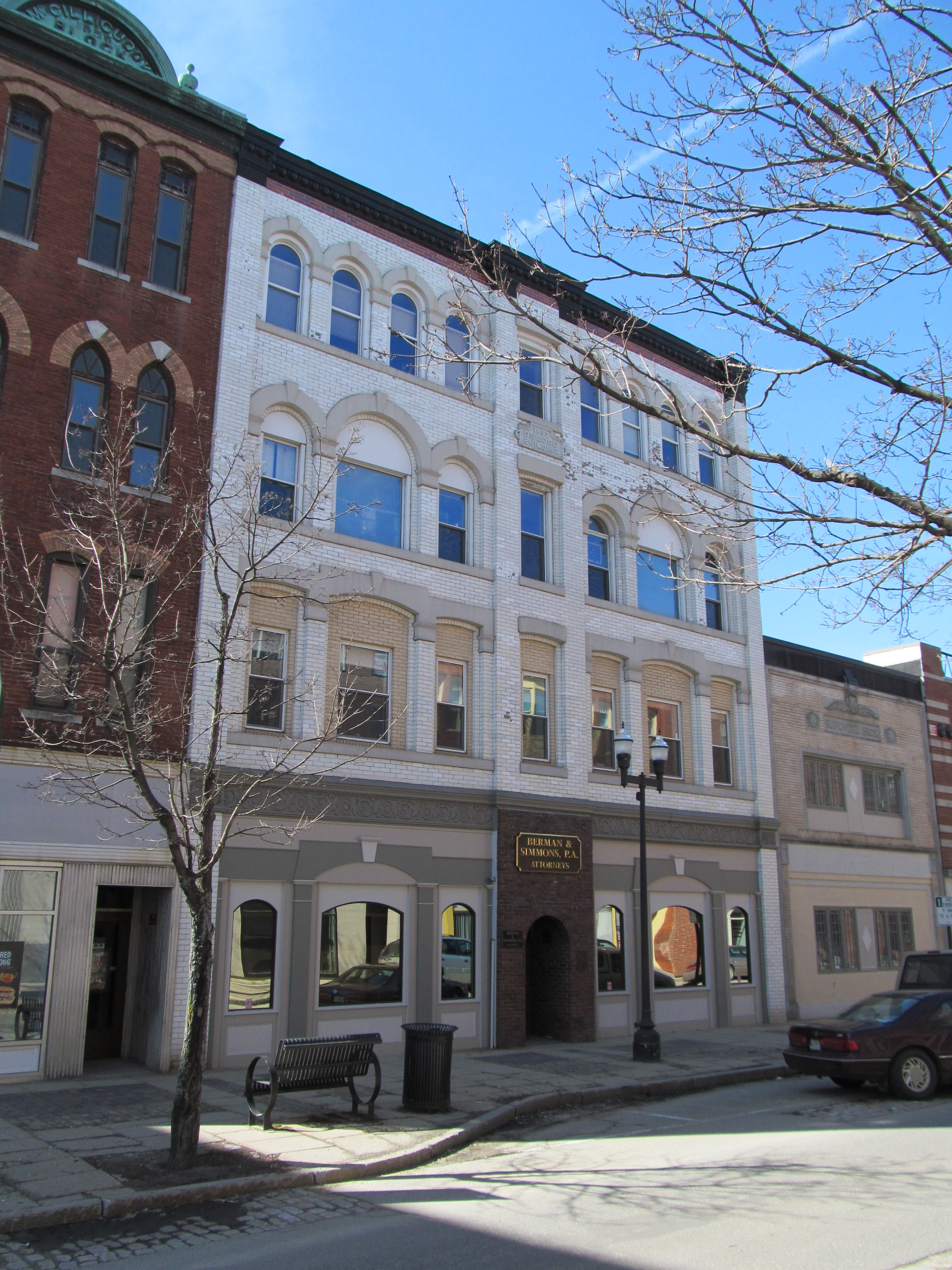
- Osgood Building

- Location within Maine Location within the United States
- Location: 129 Lisbon St., Lewiston, Maine
- Coordinates: 44°5′47″N 70°13′5″W
- Built: 1893
- Architect: Jefferson L. Coburn & Sons
- MPS: Lewiston Commercial District MRA
- NRHP reference No.: 86002289
- Added to NRHP: April 25, 1986

The Osgood Building is an historic commercial building at 129 Lisbon Street in Lewiston, Maine. Built in 1893, it is one of the few known surviving commercial works by local architect Jefferson L. Coburn, and the only known use of imported English white brick in the state. The building was listed on the National Register of Historic Places in 1986.

== Description and history ==
The Osgood Building is located on the west side of Lisbon Street, Lewiston's principal commercial thoroughfare, just north of its junction with Ash Street. It is a four-story masonry structure, built principally out of white brick imported from Leeds in the United Kingdom. Its main facade is symmetrical, with groups of three bays flanking a central bay. These groupings are articulated by pilasters that rise the full height of the building, with decorative capitals between the first and second levels (where they form part of a band of decorative stone), and the cornice. The main entrance is recessed in the central bay in an archway built of red glazed brick. The storefronts to either side consist of a central larger window with smaller flanking windows, each set in segmented-arch openings, with cast frame elements that include a keystone above the larger window. This form is repeated, with slightly different styling, on the second and third levels. The fourth level is nine bays across, with smaller round-arch windows.

The block was built in 1893 for H.A. Osgood, a jeweler with a long-established business at this site. It was designed by Jefferson L. Coburn & Sons, noted local architects who also designed the First McGillicuddy Block, just south of this one. Coburn was particularly noted for his eclectic designs. The builder was E.R. Desjardins, an immigrant from Quebec.

== See also ==
- National Register of Historic Places listings in Androscoggin County, Maine
