= Main Street–Frye Street Historic District =

Historic district in Maine, United States

- U.S. National Register of Historic Places
- U.S. Historic district
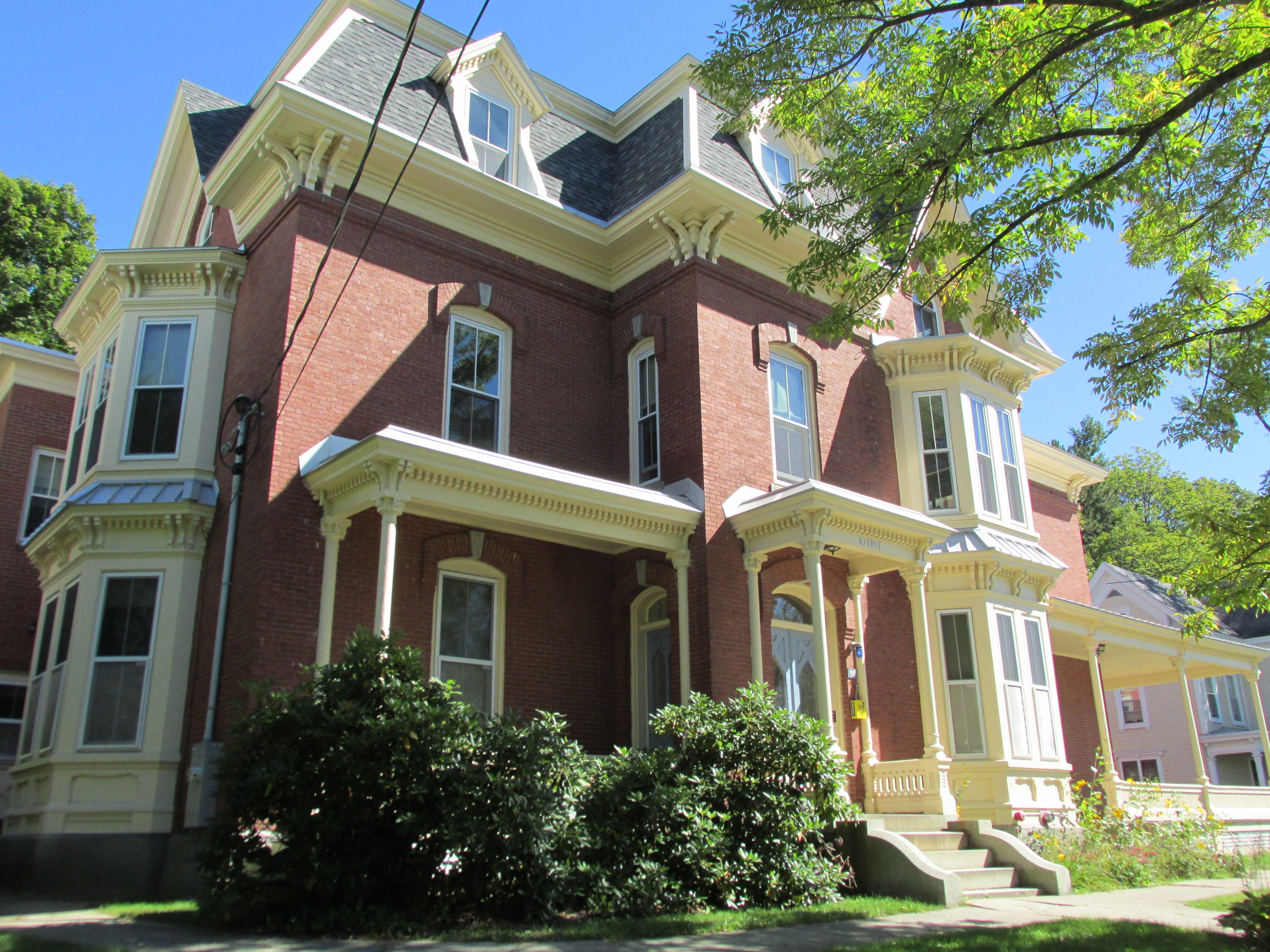
- 10 Frye Street

- Location within Maine Location within the United States
- Location: Frye, College and Main Sts., Lewiston, Maine, U.S.
- Coordinates: 44°6′22″N 70°12′40″W
- Area: 17.4 acres (7.0 ha)
- Architectural style: Second Empire, Victorian
- NRHP reference No.: 08001355
- Added to NRHP: January 23, 2009

The Main Street–Frye Street Historic District is a historic residential district in Lewiston, Maine, comprising houses on Frye Street as well as parts of College Street and Main Street.

This area was part of the most fashionable residential district of the city in the second half of the 19th century, and was home to many of the city's elite. Its architectural styles are diverse, with a significant number of homes designed by local architect George M. Coombs. The district was added to the National Register of Historic Places in 2009.

== Description and history ==
The Main Street–Frye Street Historic District encompasses 37 houses, primarily located on two blocks of Main and Frye Streets, between the city's downtown area and the early portions of the Bates College campus. The district extends on the east side of Main Street, between Mountain Avenue and Whipple Street, and includes three houses on the west side, north of Central Street. It includes all properties on Frye Street, running east from Main to College Streets, and three adjacent houses on the west side of College Street north of Frye. Many of these properties are now part of the Bates campus.

Lewiston was developed as a major textile center beginning in the 1830s by John and William Frye. The Franklin Company, which operated the mills, owned much of the land in the area, and laid out its streets. Bates College was founded in 1864, named for industrialist Benjamin Bates. The area in between the city's downtown and the Bates campus was originally farmland, which began to be sold off for development in 1851. One of the first houses built on Frye Street was that of minister Oren Burbank Cheney, the founder the College, in 1866. The Frye Street area became popular with many of the city's business and political elites because it lay just beyond company-owned lands, and was close to the college.

As a result, a significant number of architecturally high-quality houses were built, from Greek Revival and Gothic Revival cottages to elaborate Second Empire style mansions. There are 12 Queen Anne Victorians, and 11 Colonial Revival houses. Twelve of the district's 37 houses were designed by local architect George M. Coombs, providing a distinctive view of his residential designs. The area contains the Sen. William P. Frye House and the James C. Lord House, both previously listed on the National Register. Bates College now owns most of the houses on Frye Street.

On July 12,2026, a fire destroyed the Bauer Apartment building at 425 Main Street. It is listed as property 1 on the NRHP nomination form.

== See also ==
- National Register of Historic Places listings in Androscoggin County, Maine
