= Eaton School (Norridgewock, Maine) =

- U.S. National Register of Historic Places
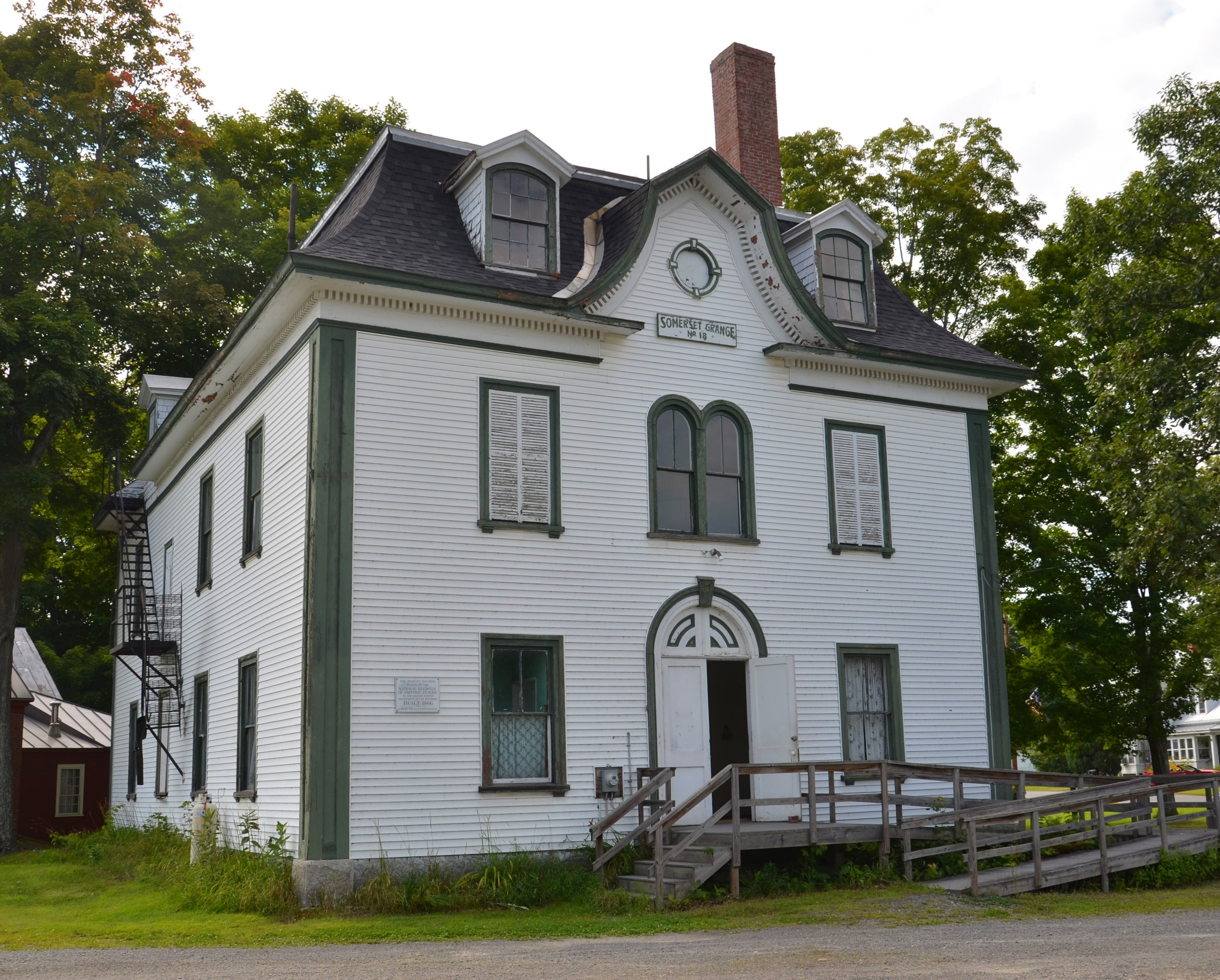

- Location within Maine Location within the United States
- Location: Jct. of Main St. and Mercer Rd., Norridgewock, Maine
- Coordinates: 44°42′48″N 69°47′55″W
- Area: less than one acre
- Built: 1866
- Architect: Charles F. Douglas
- Architectural style: Second Empire
- NRHP reference No.: 88000884
- Added to NRHP: June 23, 1988

The Eaton School, in Norridgewock, Maine, also known as Somerset Grange #18, is a historic community building at Main Street and Mercer Road in Norridgewock, Maine. Originally built in 1866–67 to house a private academy and the local Masonic lodge, it is notable as an early design of Charles F. Douglas, a Maine native whose career began in Somerset County. The building is a fine local example of Second Empire design, and was listed on the National Register of Historic Places in 1988. It has been owned since 1916 by the local chapter of the Grange.

== Description and history ==
The Grange hall is a 2 1/2-story wood-frame structure, set facing northeast on a triangular lot at the junction of Upper Main Street and Mercer Road (United States Route 2). It is three bays wide and four deep, with a bellcast mansard roof. The center bay of the front facade has a double door set in an arch on the first level, a pair of narrow round-arch windows at the second level, and the mansard roof above is broken by a bellcast gable dormer with a false bullseye window. The flanking bays, like those on the side elevations have sash windows. Gable dormers with molded sides pierce the mansard roof on all elevations, although some of the original ones have been removed.

The interior has retained its basic organization. The entrance opens to a vestibule, with a staircase going up to the right, and a hallway down the center of the building leads past two smaller classrooms to a larger one at the rear. On the second floor the arrangement is similar, except the large room also has a stage at the west end. The third floor, which was designed for use by the Masonic lodge, has two storage rooms and a large function space with raised platforms on the sides, and ornamental plasterwork in the ceiling.

The Eaton School was founded in 1865 by Hamilton Fairfield Eaton, and originally shared space in a Greek Revival meeting house and female academy. Rising enrollments prompted Eaton to retain Charles F. Douglas to design this building, which was erected in 1866–67, with funding support from the local Masonic lodge. Although Eaton retired in 1883, the school continued in various guises (and with some interruptions) until 1916, when the building was acquired by the local Grange chapter. The building is an early work of Charles F. Douglas, a native of Brunswick, Maine, whose early career work occurred primarily in Norridgewock and Skowhegan. He later made substantial contributions to the architecture of Lewiston and Auburn before moving to Philadelphia. Douglas' Norridgewock residence is also listed on the National Register.

== See also ==
- National Register of Historic Places listings in Somerset County, Maine
