= Charles F. Douglas =

American architect

Charles Francis Douglas (4 November 1833 – 21 January 1904) was an American architect from Maine.

Douglas was born in Brunswick, and was educated at the Foxcroft Academy. At the age of 18, he was apprenticed to a house-builder, with whom he remained for three years. While working as a carpenter, he independently studied architecture. In the 1860s, he moved to Skowhegan where he opened in independent office. He remained there until his bankruptcy in 1869, and relocated his office to Lewiston by the following year. He left Maine for Philadelphia in 1873, apparently because of strains put on the architectural profession by the Panic of 1873. Upon arriving in Philadelphia, he gave up his practice.

Many of his works have been placed on the National Register of Historic Places.

== Architectural works ==
- Eaton School, Upper Main St. & Mercer Rd., Norridgewock, ME (1866–67)
- Charles F. Douglas House, 13 Perkins St., Norridgewock, ME (1868)
- Pleasant Street M. E. Church, 61 Pleasant St., Waterville, ME (1869) - Demolished.
- Lyceum Hall, 49 Lisbon St., Lewiston, ME (1872)
- Somerset County Courthouse, 47 Court St., Skowhegan, ME (1872–73)
- Barker Mill, 143 Mill St., Auburn, ME (1873)
- William H. Glover House, 67 Talbot Ave., Rockland, ME (1873)
- Albert B. Nealey House, 10 Frye St., Lewiston, ME (1873)
- Milton Wedgewood House, 101 Pine St., Lewiston, ME (1873)

== Gallery ==
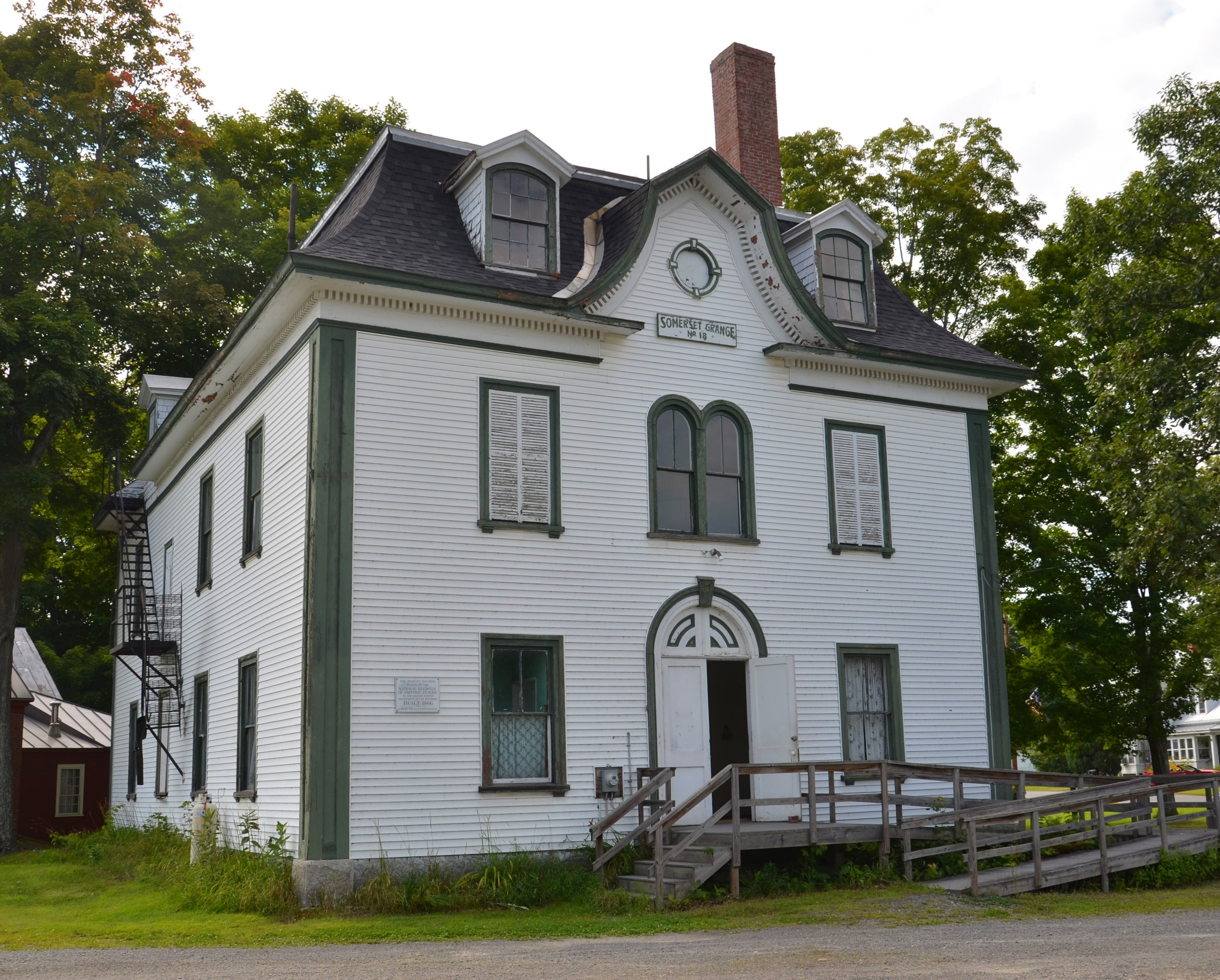
Eaton School, Norridgewock, 1866.

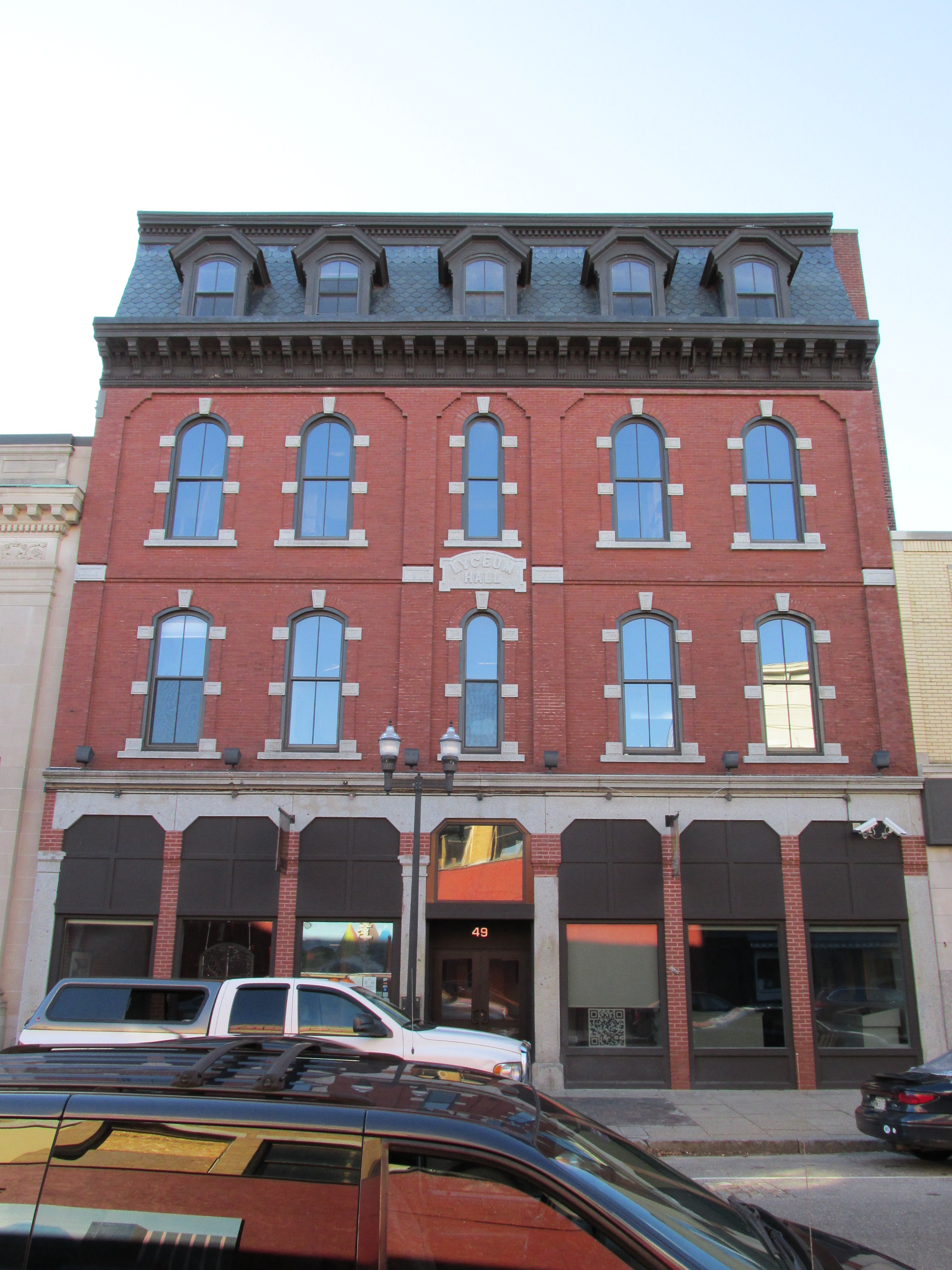
Lyceum Hall, Lewiston, 1872.

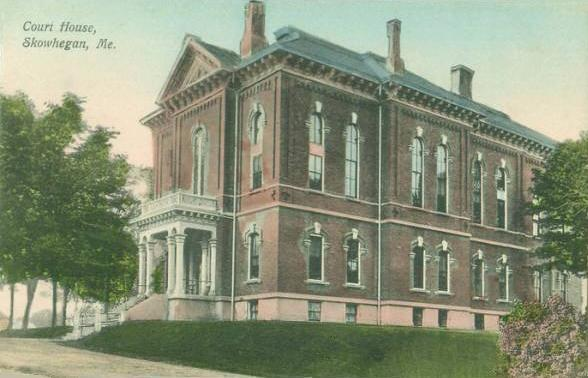
Somerset County Courthouse, Skowhegan, 1872.

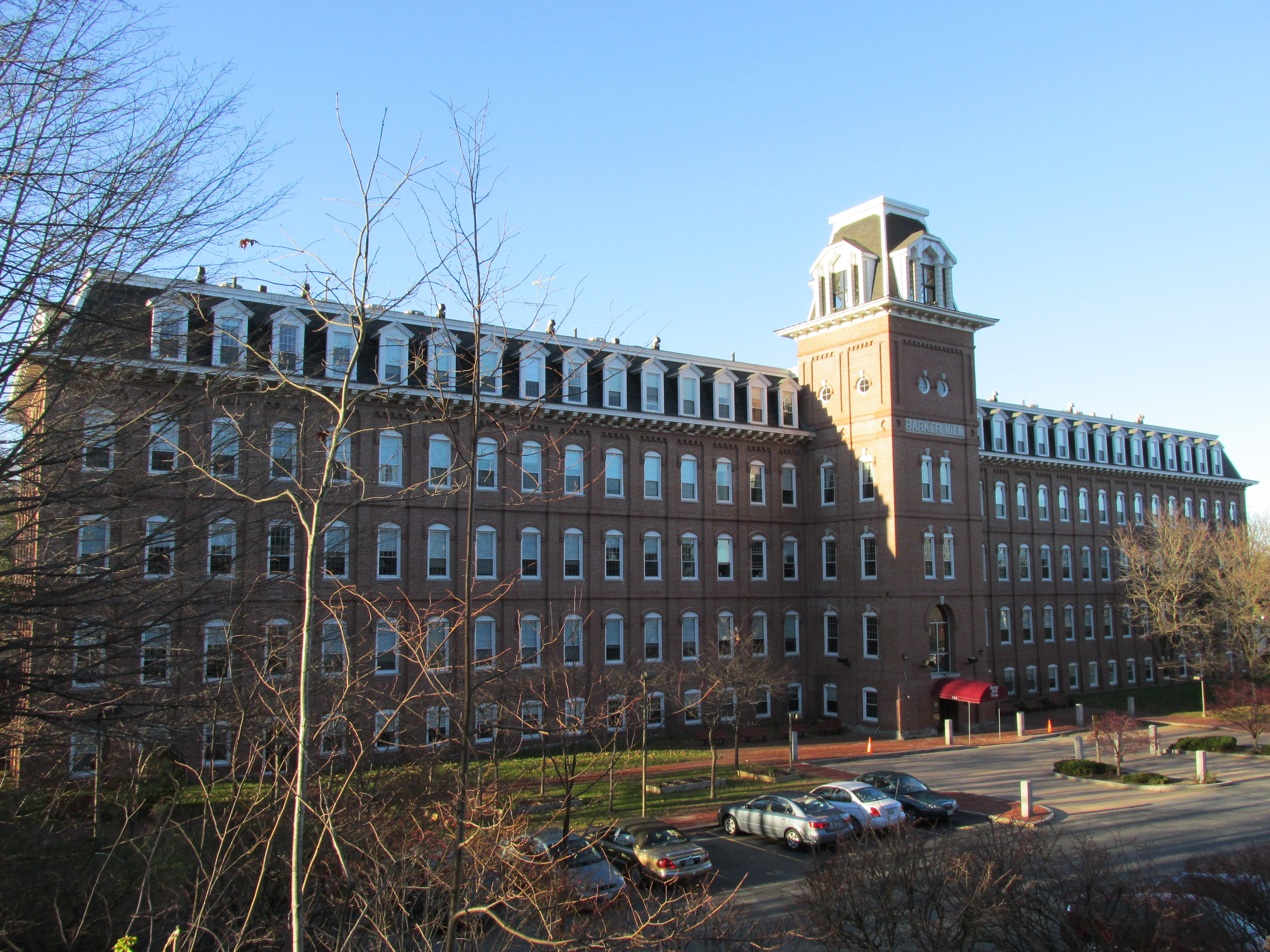
Barker Mill, Auburn, 1873.

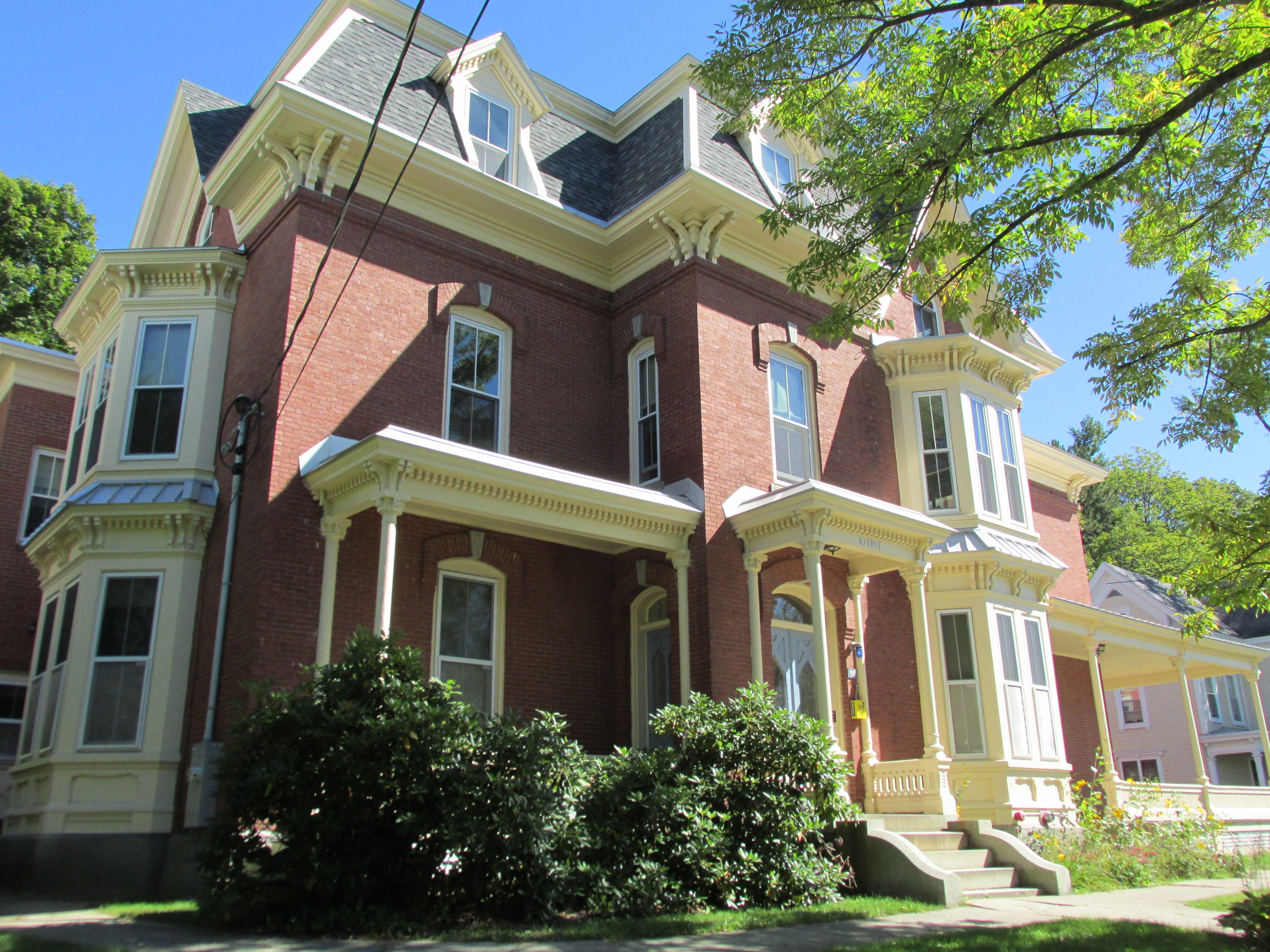
Albert B. Nealey House, Lewiston, 1873.

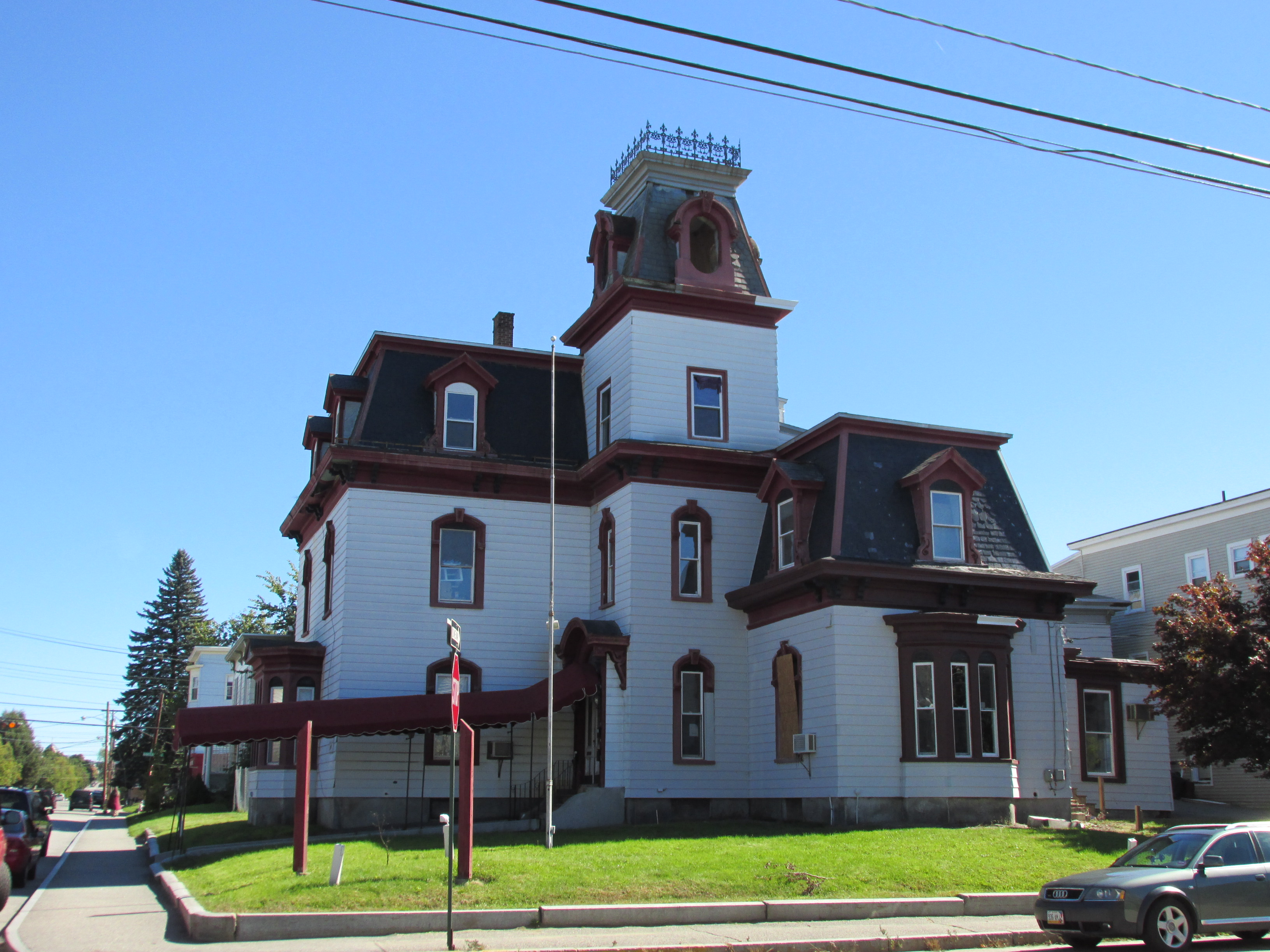
Milton Wedgewood House, Lewiston, 1873.
