= Somerset County Courthouse =

Somerset County Courthouse can refer to:

- Somerset County Courthouse (Maine)
- Somerset County Courthouse (New Jersey)
- Somerset County Courthouse (Pennsylvania)
