= Barker Mill =

- U.S. National Register of Historic Places
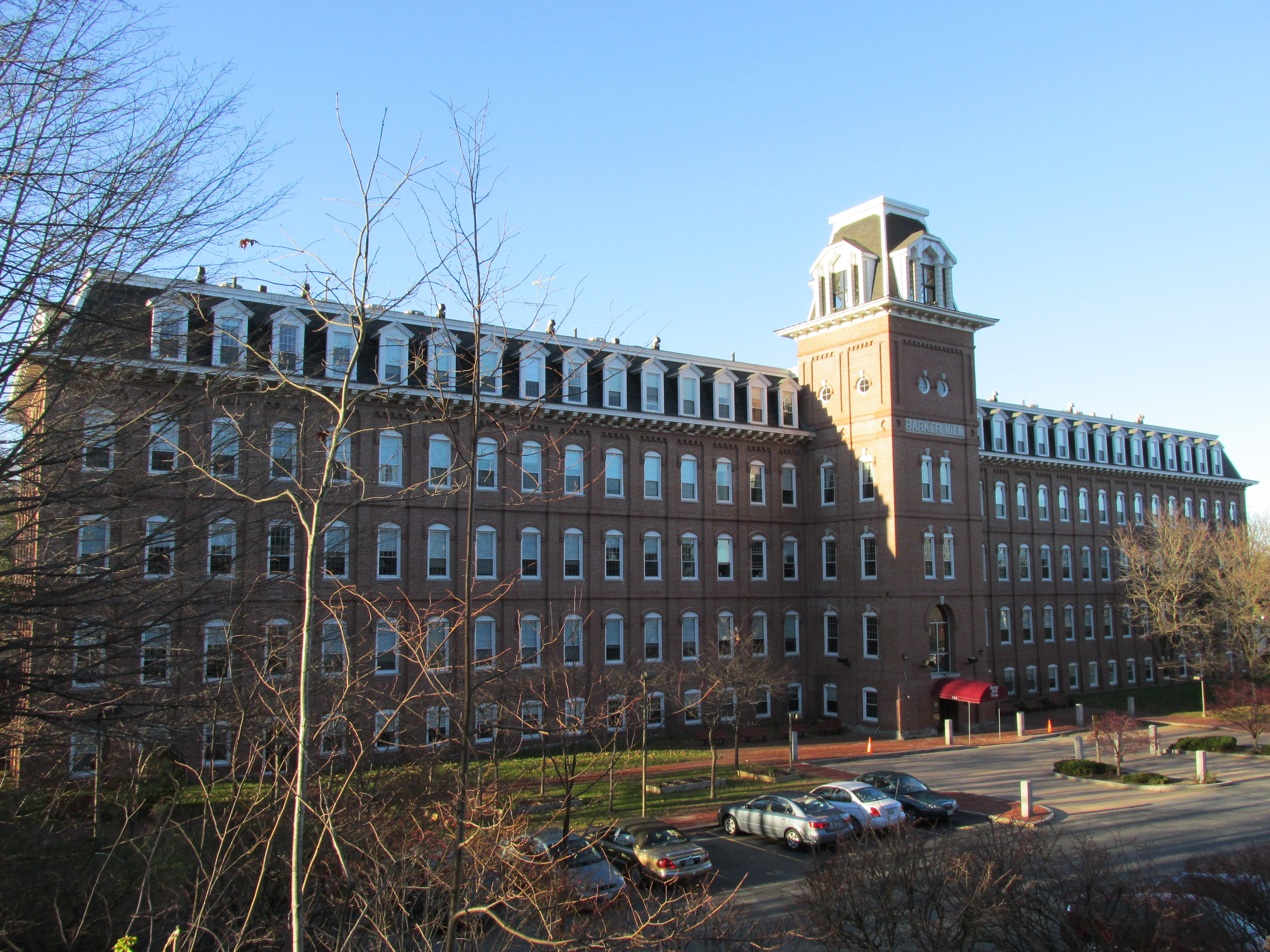
- Barker Mill

- Location within Maine Location within the United States
- Location: 143 Mill St., Auburn, Maine
- Coordinates: 44°5′15″N 70°13′39″W
- Area: less than one acre
- Built: 1873
- Architect: Charles F. Douglas
- NRHP reference No.: 79000123
- Added to NRHP: May 8, 1979

The Barker Mill is an historic mill at 143 Mill Street in Auburn, Maine. Built in 1873, this five-story brick mill building is one a relatively few in the state that has a mansard roof, and has a higher degree of decorative styling than other period mill buildings. It was the first major mill on the Auburn side of the Androscoggin River. It was listed on the National Register of Historic Places in 1979, and is now residential housing. It was built in the Second Empire architectural style.

== Description and history ==
The Barker Mill is set on the south bank of the Little Androscoggin River, a short way upriver from its confluence with the Androscoggin River. It is a five-story brick structure, 33 bays in width, with a mansard roof and a tower section that projects from its front (east-facing) facade. Its sash windows are general set in slightly recessed panels, separated by pilaster-like piers and horizontal bands. The roof has a bracketed cornice, and the steep portion of the mansard roof is lined with gable-roof dormers. The central tower is five full stories in height, with a reconstructed mansard-roofed sixth floor which also has gabled dormers embedded.

The Little Androscoggin Water Power Company was formed in 1870 to exploit the water power provided by the Little Androscoggin at this point, to which end it purchased a large amount of land along the river. The river was dammed (the dam is just upstream from the mill building) in 1872, and the mill building, designed by Maine native Charles F. Douglas, was completed in 1873. It was named for the company's directing agent, C. I. Barker. The mill produced shirting, sheeting, and other woven textiles for many years. The building was converted to an affordable retirement community in 1979.

== See also ==
- National Register of Historic Places listings in Androscoggin County, Maine
