= Auburn Public Library (Maine) =

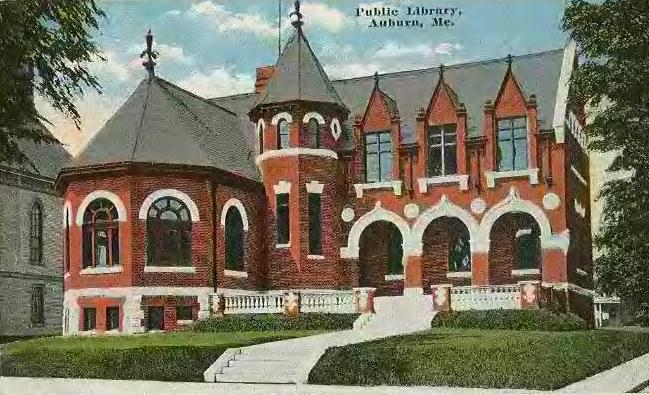
- Location: Auburn, Maine, United States
- Type: Public
- Established: 1903

Collection
- Size: 75,000

Access and use
- Circulation: 225,000
- Population served: 23,055

Other information
- Budget: $1,117,097
- Director: Mamie Anthoine Ney
- Employees: 21
- Auburn Public Library
- U.S. National Register of Historic Places
- Location: Auburn, Maine
- Coordinates: 44°5′53″N 70°13′47″W
- Built: 1903
- Architect: William R. Miller
- Architectural style: Renaissance
- NRHP reference No.: 84001357
- Added to NRHP: March 22, 1984

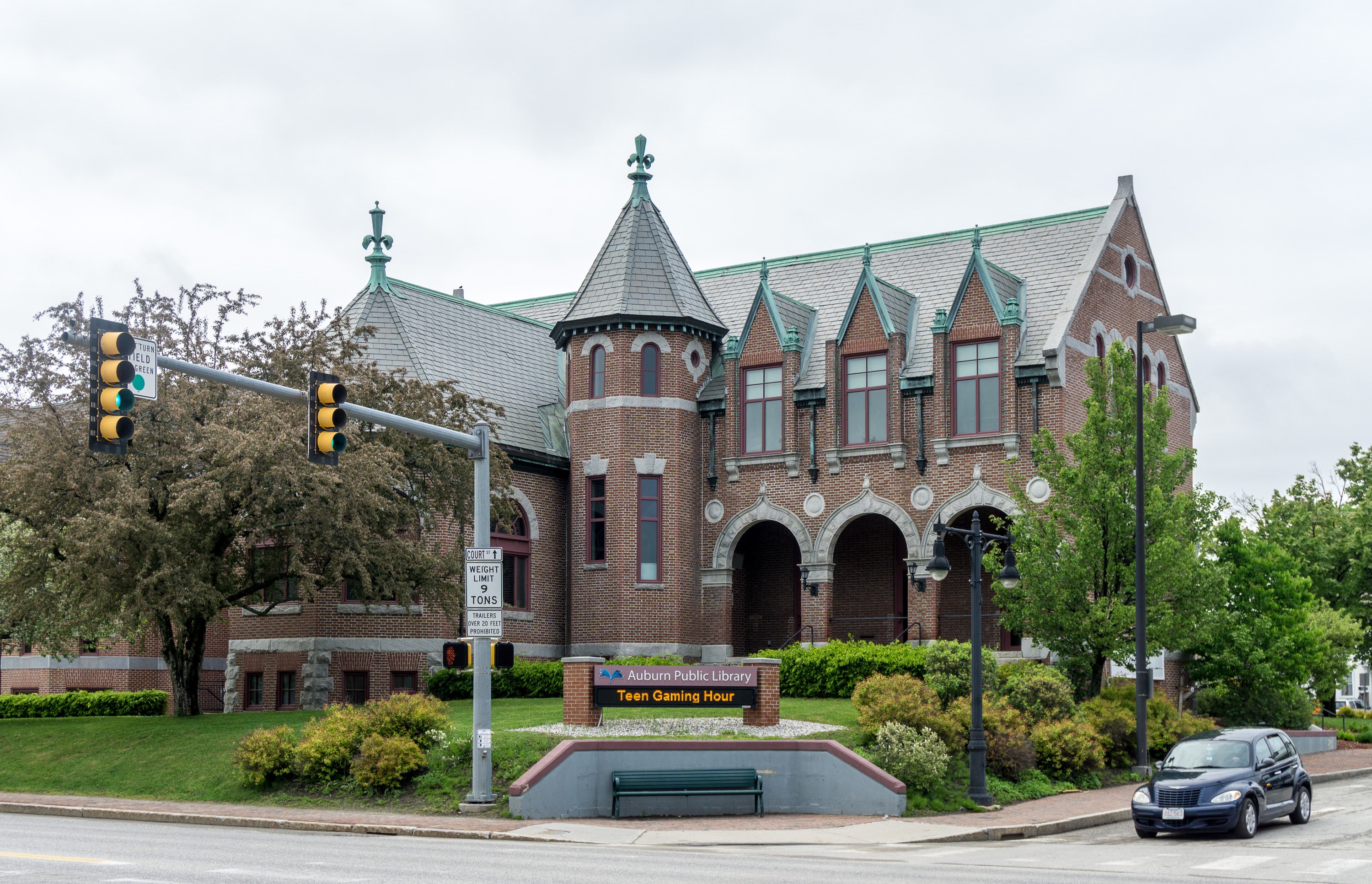
The library in 2017

Auburn Public Library is the public library of Auburn, Maine. It is located at 49 Spring Street.

== History ==
The library's main building was built in 1903 with a donation from Andrew Carnegie, and the building was designed by architect William R. Miller in a Renaissance style. It was listed on the National Register of Historic Places in 1984. State Representative and one time Mayor of Auburn George C. Wing Jr. was President of the Auburn Public Library's Board of Trustees from 1939 to 1951.

The library building was expanded in 1956 and again in 2006 to accommodate a growing user community and additional services. The current library is twice the size of the original 1904 building. Care was taken during the 2006 expansion to stay true to the original architecture of the building, earning the library a Statewide Historic Preservation Honor Award from Maine Preservation in 2007.

In the fall of 2012, the library opened a Media Lab that provides access to computers, cameras, scanners, and other equipment for creating digital media such as video, photographs, and music. An independently owned cafe operates on the ground floor of the library.

Teen participation became an integral part of the library when in the summer of 2003 the first Teen Summer Reading Program was introduced by librarian Sally Holt with the support of Rosemary Waltos, Director and Steve Bouchard, Reference Department Head.

Friends of the Auburn Public Library played an instrumental role by funding the program. Friends of Maine Libraries continued funding the program that fall. The teen program has grown to be one of the largest most well-attended teen public library programs in the state. Teens are a special piece of the fabric at APL.

== See also ==
- National Register of Historic Places listings in Androscoggin County, Maine
- List of Carnegie libraries in Maine
