= Deborah Simpson =

American politician

Member of the Maine Senate from the 15th district
- In office December 3, 2008 – December 6, 2010
- Preceded by: Lois Snowe-Mello
- Succeeded by: Lois Snowe-Mello

Personal details
- Party: Democratic
- Spouse: Manuel Pilar

Deborah L. Simpson is an American politician from Maine. Simpson served as a Democratic State Senator from Maine's 15th District, representing part of Androscoggin County, including her residence in Auburn from 2008 to 2010. She was elected to the Maine House of Representatives, representing Auburn, in 2000, 2002, 2004 and 2006, each time as a publicly financed candidate. She was unable to seek re-election to the House in 2008 due to term-limits. In one of the tightest 2008 state senate campaigns, Simpson challenged incumbent Republican Lois Snowe-Mello. She ran for the State Senate and unseated Snowe-Mello by 104 votes. In a Republican wave election, Simpson lost to Snowe-Mello in 2010.

In her only term in the Senate, Simpson chaired two committees, specifically the Government Oversight Committee and the Joint Committee on State and Local Government.
