= Lyceum Hall =

- U.S. National Register of Historic Places
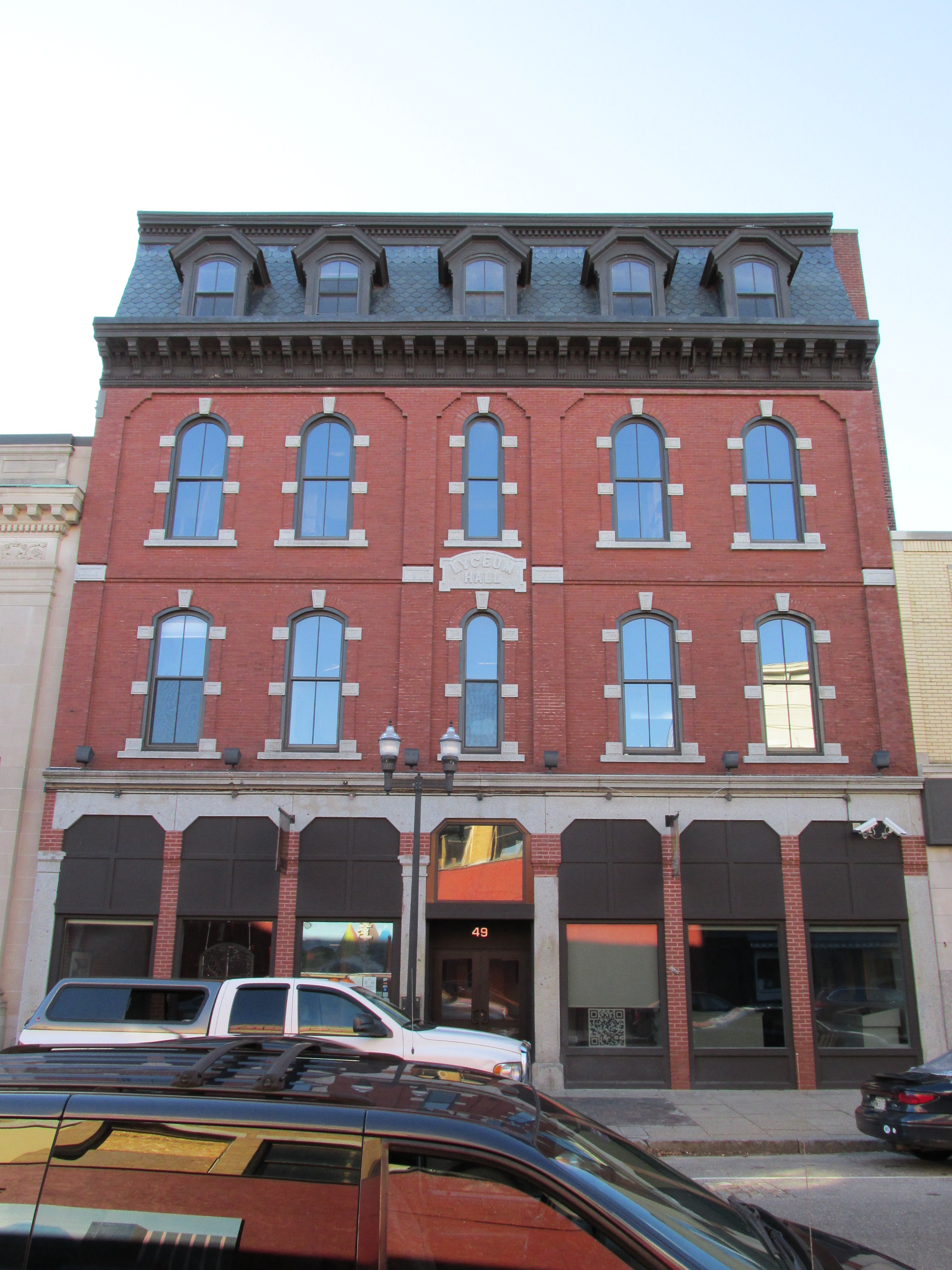
- Lyceum Hall

- Location within Maine Location within the United States
- Location: 49 Lisbon Street, Lewiston, Maine
- Coordinates: 44°5′51″N 70°13′6″W
- Area: less than one acre
- Built: 1872
- Architect: Charles F. Douglas
- Architectural style: Second Empire
- MPS: Lewiston Commercial District MRA
- NRHP reference No.: 86002285
- Added to NRHP: April 25, 1986

Lyceum Hall is a historic commercial building in downtown Lewiston, Maine, United States. Built in 1872, the Second Empire hall is one of the city's few surviving designs of Charles F. Douglas, a leading Maine architect of the period, and for a number of years housed the city's only performance venue. The building was listed on the National Register of Historic Places in 1986.

== Description and history ==
Lyceum Hall is located on the west side of Lisbon Street, the principal commercial street in downtown Lewiston. It is nominally a 3 1/2-story masonry structure, with a mansard roof providing space for a full fourth floor. The building facade is symmetrical, with a central one-bay section flanked by identical two-bay sections. The central section has the recessed building entrance on the first floor, and narrow round-arch windows on the second and third floors, set in a recessed brick panel. The remaining ground-floor bays all have commercial glass storefront windows, articulated by stone or brick piers. The outer bays on the second floor have segmented-arch windows, while those on the third floor are round-arched. The fourth floor dormers have segmented-arch windows. The main cornice (below the steep mansard roof section) is bracketed and dentillated, and a secondary cornice at the transition between the roof sections is dentillated.

The hall was built in 1872 to a design by Charles F. Douglas, a prominent local architect. Douglas designed a number of Lewiston's downtown buildings during a flurry of construction after the American Civil War, but this is the only one to survive relatively intact. It originally housed a 1000-seat theater on the third floor, which was the city's only public performance venue until the construction of the city's Music Hall. The building underwent a full restoration in the 1980s.

== See also ==
- National Register of Historic Places listings in Androscoggin County, Maine
