= George C. Wing Jr. =

American politician

George Curtis Wing Jr. (born October 6, 1878 – March 18, 1951) was an American politician and lawyer from Maine. He was born in Livermore, Maine, and raised in Auburn, Maine, where he attended Edward Little High School. He then attended Brown University, graduating in 1900 and Harvard University School of Law in 1903. He represented his hometown of Auburn in the Maine House of Representatives for five terms. He was first elected in 1908. Leaving office after one term, he was sent back to the House in 1920, 1922, 1924, and 1926. In 1922, he unsuccessfully sought election as Speaker of the Maine House of Representatives.

He was a leading politician in Auburn for many years. He was a leading voice in the successful campaign to institute a city manager system of government, including as city solicitor, library trustee, member of the Board of Education, and mayor from 1934-35. He served as President of the Board of Trustees of the Auburn Public Library from 1939–51.

He died in 1951 at the age of 72.
