= Lewiston and Auburn Railroad =

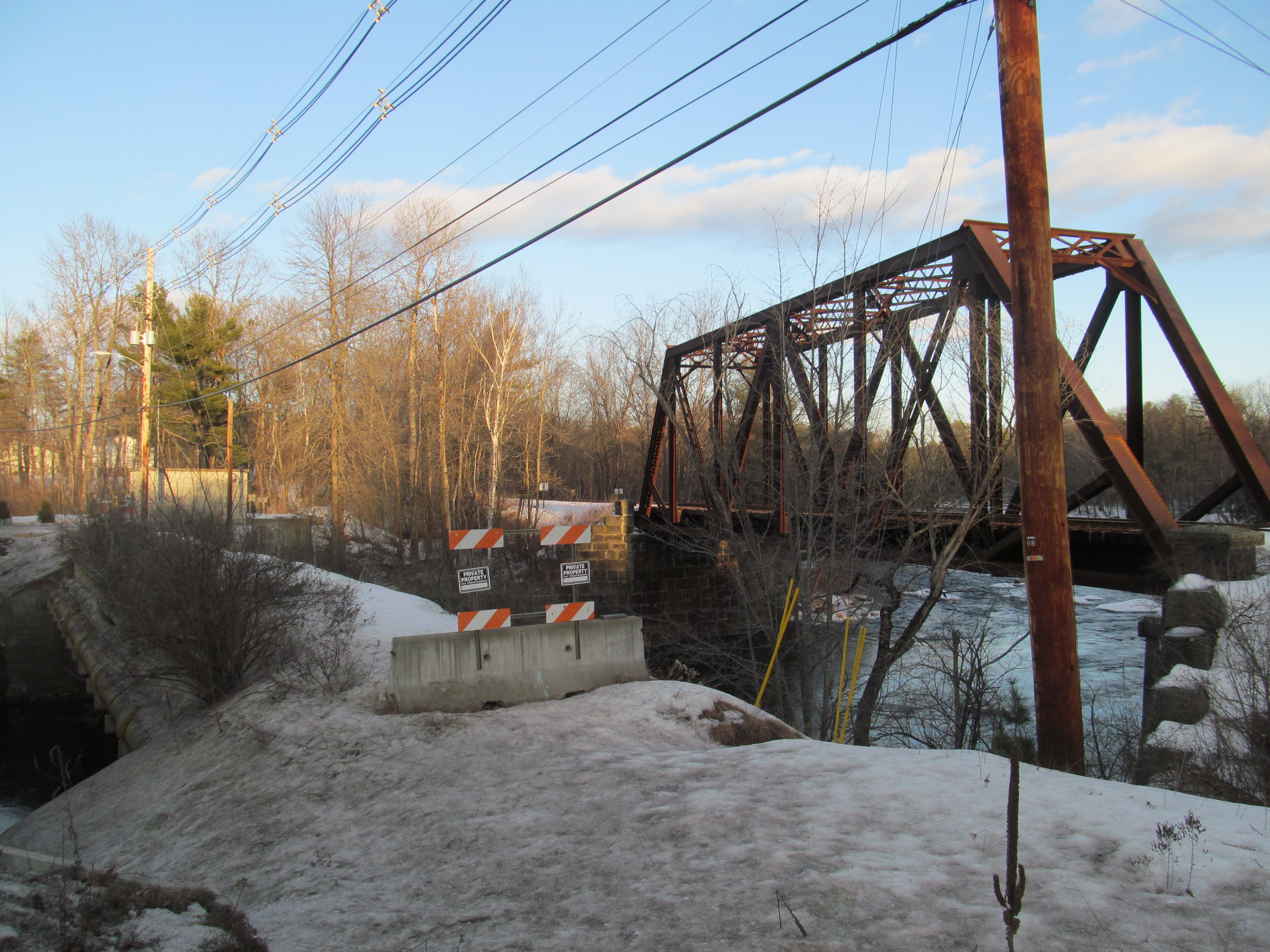
- A Lewiston and Auburn Railroad bridge (right) in Auburn. At left is a former Portland–Lewiston Interurban bridge.

Overview
- Other names: L&R
- Owner: Lewiston and Auburn Railroad Company (Cities of Lewiston and Auburn)
- Website: https://www.auburnmaine.gov/Pages/Government/Lewiston-Auburn-Railroad-Company-LARC-

Service
- Operator(s): St. Lawrence and Atlantic Railroad
Route map
Maximum extent of the L&A

The Lewiston and Auburn Railroad Company is a railroad holding company located in Androscoggin County, Maine. It is jointly owned by the cities of Lewiston and Auburn. It was founded in 1872 to link these two cities with the nearby Grand Trunk Railroad main line running from Portland to Montreal (and on to Chicago) in order to provide a competing transportation service to the Maine Central Railroad which had previously held a monopoly in the area.

During the late 20th century the rail line owned by the Lewiston & Auburn Railroad Co. was cut back from Lewiston and currently only runs from Lewiston Junction to an industrial park in Auburn. The L&A rail line has been operated under contract by the St. Lawrence and Atlantic Railroad since that company purchased the former Canadian National Railway (ex-Grand Trunk Railway) line from Portland to Montreal in 1989.
