= Powers Hapgood =

American politician

- A newspaper file photo from the middle 1930s.
- Born: December 28, 1899
- Died: February 4, 1949 (aged 49)
- Known for: Involvement with United Mine Workers in the 1920s
- Political party: Socialist Party
- Movement: Union organizing

Powers Hapgood (1899–1949) was an American trade union organizer and Socialist Party leader known for his involvement with the United Mine Workers in the 1920s.

== Biography ==
=== Early years ===
Powers Hapgood was born on December 28, 1899, the son of William Powers Hapgood, a Progressive canning factory owner in Indianapolis, and his wife, the former Eleanor Page. Hapgood graduated from Phillips Academy in Andover, Massachusetts in 1917 and enrolled in Harvard University, from which he earned his bachelor's degree in 1921.

Even prior to graduation, Hapgood had spent time experiencing the life of the working class first hand. During the fall and early winter of 1920, he spent nearly four months working his way across the western United States. Hapgood worked as a miner at Hibbing, Minnesota, on the Northern Pacific Railroad and in a Montana sugar beet factory. Upon graduation, Hapgood decided to dedicate his life to mobilizing the working-class.

Hapgood went to work as an organizer for the United Mine Workers of America (UMWA) in 1922. Hapgood was instrumental in organizing non-union coal mines in Somerset County, Pennsylvania, during the Somerset Coal Strike of 1922–23, especially mines at Jerome, Boswell and Gray. Hapgood later aided John Brophy in his challenge to John L. Lewis for the leadership of the UMWA, a failed attempt which ultimately led to the ouster of both Hapgood and Brophy from the Union.

Following his ouster, Hapgood subsequently went abroad and worked himself as a miner in South Wales, France, Germany, and Soviet Russia. He finally returned to Pennsylvania again and became active in the UMWA. Hapgood was elected to the August 1927 annual convention of the UMWA as a delegate of the union's local from Cresson, Pennsylvania. Hapgood's presence at the scene of the convention was greeted by the UMWA officialdom with physical force, in which a false telephone message lured Hapgood into a hotel room where he was met by three toughs. A brawl ensued, which was interrupted by the hotel manager, who called the police.

Hapgood refused to be bullied into retreating from the UMWA convention, but with union leader Lewis firmly ensconced in his position of power by that gathering, in the aftermath Hapgood decided to depart the Pennsylvania mine fields. Instead, Hapgood went to work as a longshoreman to support himself. In his free time, Hapgood spoke on behalf of the Sacco-Vanzetti Defense Committee in an effort to rally support in defense of two Italian-American anarchists accused of murder committed in the act of robbing a New England shoe factory.

On December 28, 1927, Hapgood married Mary Donovan (d. Aug. 1973), the Secretary of the Sacco-Vanzetti Defense Committee. The couple had a daughter, Barta Donovan, in 1929 and adopted a son in 1930.

=== Political career ===
Powers Hapgood joined the Socialist Party of America in 1926.

In 1928, he campaigned for his wife in her race for Governor of Massachusetts, heading the state Socialist Party ticket.

Hapgood ran for Governor of Indiana on the Socialist Party ticket in 1932, losing to Paul V. McNutt.

In the early 1930s, Hapgood was an organizer for the Amalgamated Clothing Workers Union.

Hapgood was the New England secretary for the Committee for Industrial Organization (CIO) during the middle 1930s, a position which landed him in jail for two months in 1937 for contempt of court for his role in continuing a strike of shoe-workers in Lewiston and Auburn in the wake of an injunction forbidding strike activity. Hapgood worked as an organizer for the CIO throughout the rest of the 1930s. From 1941 to 1947, Hapgood was named the CIO's regional director for Indiana. In 1948, he became an assistant to Allen Haywood, a vice president of the CIO and head of its national organization efforts.

=== Death and legacy ===
Powers Hapgood died February 4, 1949. Robert Bussel, in his biography of Hapgood, wrote that Hapgood died from a heart attack while driving his car on Feb. 4, 1949.

German-American author (and fellow Indiana native) Kurt Vonnegut pays homage to Hapgood in his novel Jailbird.

Powers Hapgood's papers are housed at the Lilly Library at the Indiana University in Bloomington.

== Works ==
=== Books and pamphlets ===
- In Non-Union Mines: The Diary of a Coal Digger in Central Pennsylvania, August–September, 1921. New York: Bureau of Industrial Research, 1922.
- Radio Address on "A Crisis with Coal Miners." Taylorville, IL: Daily Courier Co., 1930.
- Private Ownership of Coal Mines Brings Chaos, Tyranny and Hunger. Chicago: Socialist Party of America, n.d. [1932].
- Slavery in the Coal Fields: What Shall We Do About It? Chicago: Socialist Party of America, n.d. [c. 1932].
- The Columbia Conserve Company, Indianapolis, Indiana: An Experiment in Workers' Management and Ownership. Indianapolis: Columbia Conserve Co., 1934.
- Report and Recommendations of Industry Committee Number 6 for the Establishment of Minimum Wage Rates in the Shoe Manufacturing and Allied Industries. Washington, DC: The Committee, 1939.

=== Articles ===
- "Workmen's Compensation — Discussion." Contributor. The American Economic Review, vol. 12, no. 1 (March 1922), pp. 153–167.
- "Hapgood Makes Hot Reply to John L. Lewis," The Daily Worker, vol. 3, no. 245 (October 29, 1926), pp. 1, 5.
