= Dr. Milton Wedgewood House =

Historic house in Maine, United States

- U.S. National Register of Historic Places
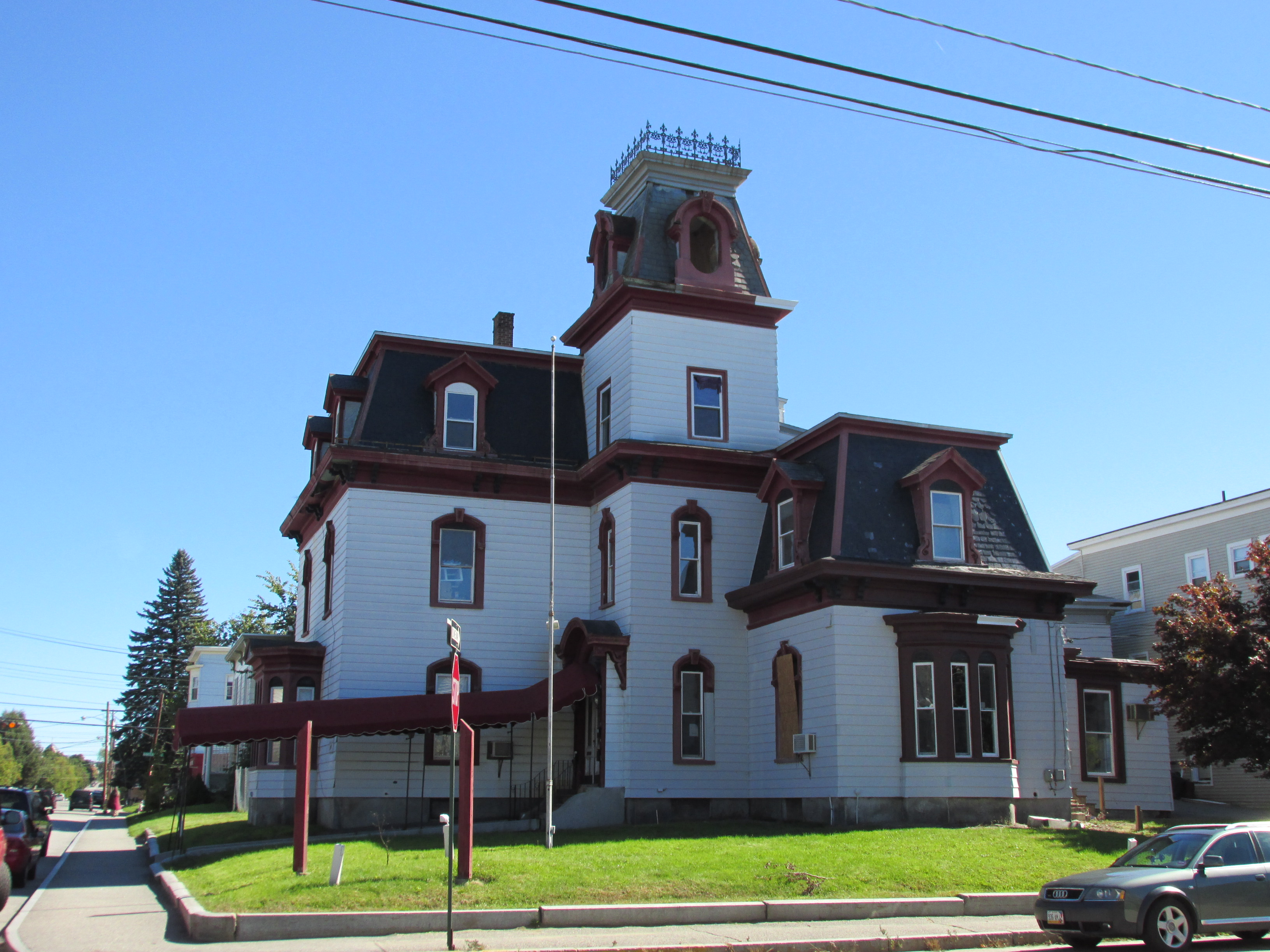
- Dr. Milton Wedgewood House

- Location within Maine Location within the United States
- Location: 101 Pine St., Lewiston, Maine
- Coordinates: 44°5′47″N 70°12′44″W
- Built: 1873
- Architect: Charles F. Douglas
- Architectural style: Second Empire
- NRHP reference No.: 86000071
- Added to NRHP: January 10, 1986

The Dr. Milton Wedgewood House is a historic house at 101 Pine Street in Lewiston, Maine. Built in 1873 for a local doctor, it is a distinctive local example of Second Empire, and an important work of local architect Charles F. Douglas. The house was listed on the National Register of Historic Places in 1986.

== Description and history ==
The Dr. Milton Wedgewood House stands in a predominantly residential area east of Lewiston's commercial downtown, at the southeast corner of Pine and Pierce Streets. It consists of a two-story mansard-roofed main section, from which a three-story tower and single-story ell, also with mansard roofs, project toward the Pierce Street side. The tower's roof is capped by original iron cresting. The roofs are pierced by gabled dormers with sash windows set in segmented-arch openings on the main roof lines, and with fixed-pane windows set in rounded oblong openings in the tower's roof. The building's main windows are sash, set in segmented-arch surrounds with keystones and ears. The interior retains original moulded woodwork and marble fireplaces.

The house was built in 1873 for Dr. Milton Wedgewood, a prominent local doctor. It was designed by Charles F. Douglas, known for his large-scale work on Lewiston's mills. He was also known to tailor his designs to specific needs of his clients, in this case providing a consultation space for the doctor that was separated from his residence.

== See also ==
- National Register of Historic Places listings in Androscoggin County, Maine
