= William Briggs Homestead =

Historic house in Maine, United States

- U.S. National Register of Historic Places
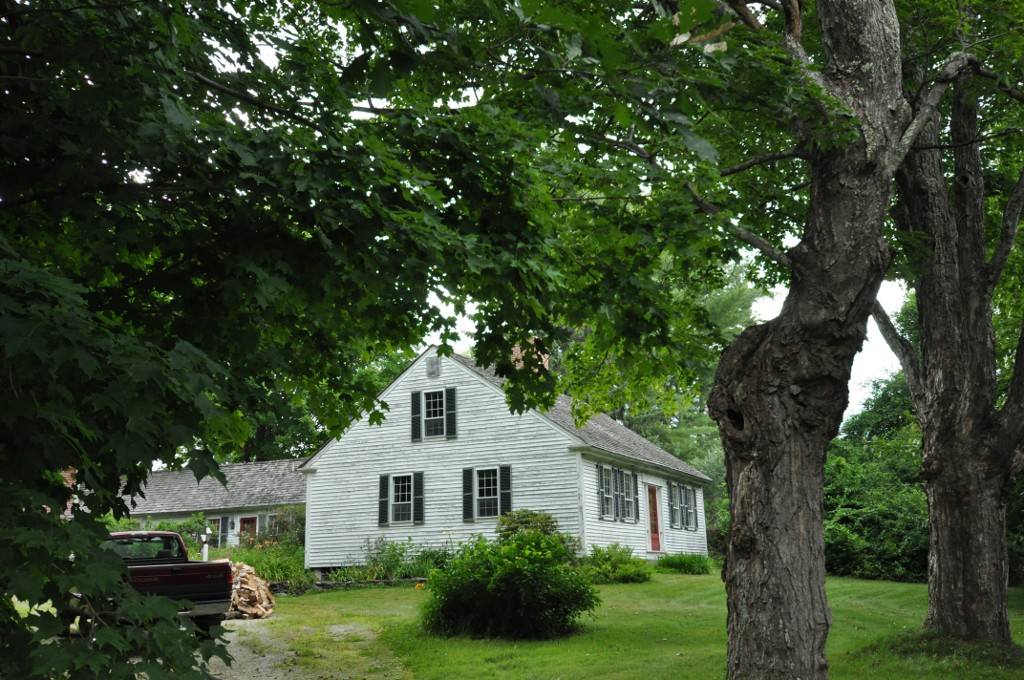

- Location within Maine Location within the United States
- Location: Auburn, Maine
- Coordinates: 44°8′29.8″N 70°13′40.7″W
- Built: 1797
- Architect: William Briggs
- NRHP reference No.: 86000477
- Added to NRHP: March 20, 1986

The William Briggs Homestead is an historic farmhouse at 1470 Turner Street in Auburn, Maine. Built in 1797 by one of the area's early settlers, it is one of Auburn's oldest surviving buildings. It was listed on the National Register of Historic Places in 1986.

== Description and history ==
The Briggs Homestead is set at the southwest corner of Turner and Church Streets in northern Auburn, just east of Lake Auburn. Turner Street was historically the main route through this area, having been supplanted by the current alignment of Maine State Route 4 in the 20th century. The house is a 1 1/2-story wood-frame structure, five bays wide, with a central chimney and clapboard siding. Its main facade is symmetrical, with a center entrance that has a Federal period surround of sidelight windows, pilasters, and entablature above. A single-story ell extends to the rear of the house, joining it to a barn. The interior of the house retains high-quality original woodwork and hardware, including trim, molding, paneling, and wainscoting.

This area is believed to be the first to be settled in what is now Auburn. Originally part of Minot, this property (originally much larger) was granted to Samuel Berry in recognition for his service on Benedict Arnold's expedition to Quebec in 1775. In 1779 it was purchased from Berry by William Briggs, originally of Dighton, Massachusetts, who built this house in about 1797. It is believed to be one of the oldest (if not the oldest) in the "East Auburn" area.

== See also ==
- National Register of Historic Places listings in Androscoggin County, Maine
