= Frank L. Dingley House =

Historic house in Maine, United States

- U.S. National Register of Historic Places
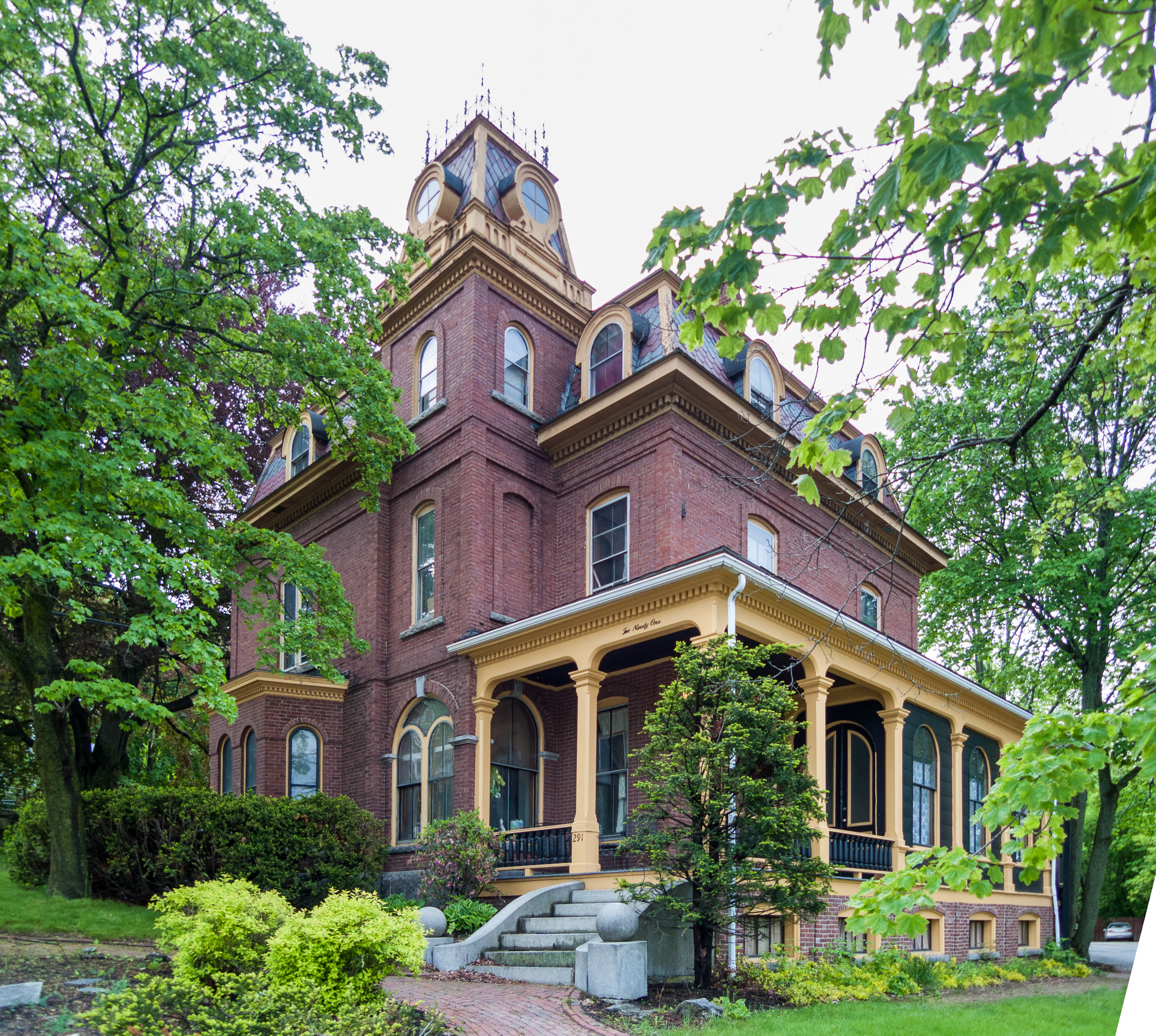
- Frank L. Dingley House

- Location within Maine Location within the United States
- Location: 291 Court Street, Auburn, Maine
- Coordinates: 44°5′53″N 70°13′58″W
- Built: 1867
- Architectural style: Second Empire
- NRHP reference No.: 80000211
- Added to NRHP: April 23, 1980

The Frank L. Dingley House is a historic house in Auburn, Maine, United States. Built in 1867, it is a high-quality local example of Second Empire architecture. It is most significant as the long-time home of Frank L. Dingley, long-time editor of the Lewiston Evening Journal, the state's second-largest newspaper at the time. The house was listed on the National Register of Historic Places in 1980.

== Description and history ==
The Dingley House is set on the north side of Court Street, in a residential area just west of Auburn's downtown area. It is a nominally 2 1/2-story brick structure, with a mansard roof providing a full third floor. The roof is slate, pierced by two brick chimneys, and there is a mansard-topped tower on the street-facing facade. The main facade, however is oriented toward the east, looking down the hill over Auburn and Lewiston. A single-story porch extends along this facade, with decorative denticulated cornice and wooden posts.

The house was built in 1867 for Frank Dingley, and was his home until his death in 1918. A graduate of Bowdoin College, Dingley was for 57 years chief editor of the Lewiston Evening Journal, which he and his brother converted to a daily newspaper when they acquired it in 1861. Dingley was innovative in the early adoption of the telegraph for transmission of news reports, and oversaw a great expansion of the newspaper's facilities in 1898. He was a local patron of the arts, and supported the efforts of F. E. Stanley to produce the Stanley Steamer automobile.

== See also ==
- National Register of Historic Places listings in Androscoggin County, Maine
