= 1937 Lewiston–Auburn shoe strike =

Strike among textile workers in Maine

The Lewiston–Auburn shoe strike of 1937 occurred in the cities of Lewiston, Maine and Auburn, Maine among textile workers, most of whom were of French-Canadian descent. The workers walked off the job on March 25, 1937 demanding higher pay, a shorter workweek, better working conditions and union representation. Shortly after the strike began, the manufacturers offered a 10% wage increase, which was refused by the Strikers. By early April, 4,000 to 5,000 workers, including skilled and unskilled, were on strike. On April 21, workers and union organizers attempted to march across South Bridge (now Bernard Lown Peace Bridge), which connect Lewiston's Little Canada neighborhood and Auburn. Police and workers fought, including many women on the workers' side. Depicted in the Lewiston Evening Journal as 'Red Wednesday', Governor Lewis Barrows called in the Maine Army National Guard. Overall, the strike ended with a loss for the workers on June 29, 1937.

Powers Hapgood, the New England secretary for the Committee for Industrial Organization (CIO) at the time, arrived in Lewiston on March 12 to coordinate the strike. was jailed for two months for contempt of court for his role in continuing the strike in the wake of an injunction by a Maine Supreme Judicial Court justice forbidding strike activity.

In 1992, Bates College professor Robert Branham made a 55-minute documentary about the strike called "Roughing the Uppers: the Great Shoe Strike of 1937".

Labor historian Charles Scontras said of the strike, "In the shoe strike, the wholesale violation of civil liberties prompted the American Civil Liberties Union to state that 'Maine is at least 100 years behind the time in labor laws'."

In 2008, a mural depicting the history of Maine's workers, including a depiction of the Lewiston–Auburn shoe strike, was commissioned by Maine Arts Commission and put on display in the Maine Department of Labor. In March 2011, Republican Governor Paul LePage, a staunchly pro-business politician, ordered the mural taken down, which in turn created statewide controversy.
