= John H. Sturgis =

American politician (1863–1949)

John H. Sturgis (April 10, 1863 – November 11, 1949) was an American politician from Maine. A Republican from Auburn, Sturgis served three terms in the Maine House of Representatives from 1923 to 1928. While in the Legislature, Sturgis was a member of the Agriculture Committee and Temperance Committee as well as on the committee overseeing the Maine State Prison.

He was originally from Cape Elizabeth, Maine and was prominent in Freemasonry. He is interred at Mountain View Cemetery in Auburn.
