= Somerset County Courthouse (Maine) =

- U.S. National Register of Historic Places
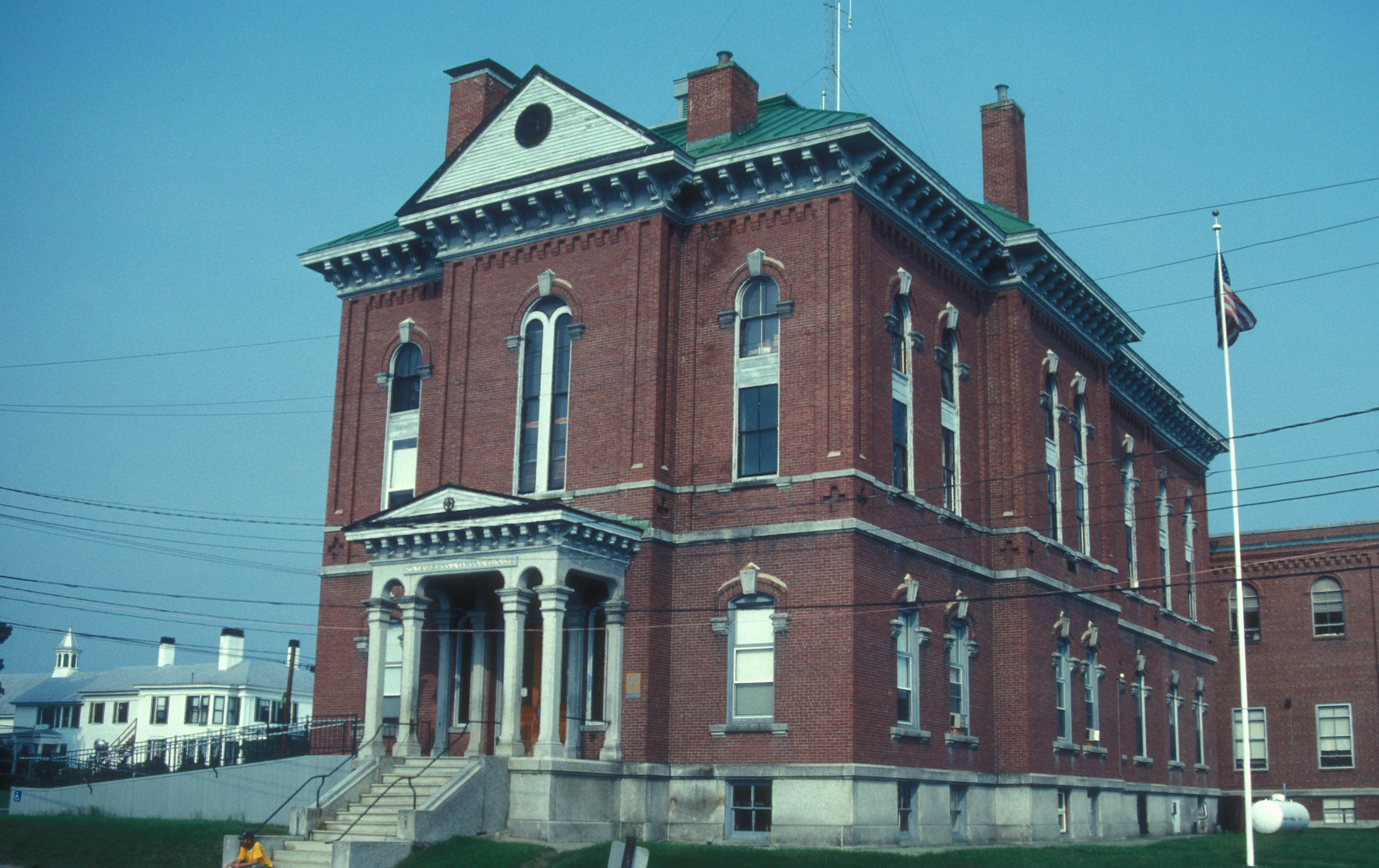

- Location within Maine Location within the United States
- Location: Court St., Skowhegan, Maine
- Coordinates: 44°45′59″N 69°43′10″W
- Area: 0.3 acres (0.12 ha)
- Built: 1873
- Architect: Charles F. Douglas; John Calvin Stevens
- NRHP reference No.: 84000332
- Added to NRHP: November 8, 1984

The Somerset County Courthouse is a historic county government building on Court Street in downtown Skowhegan, Maine, the county seat of Somerset County. The brick building was designed by local architect Charles F. Douglas and built in 1873, with an addition by John Calvin Stevens in 1904, and a second addition added in 1938. The building continues to serve county functions; it was listed on the National Register of Historic Places in 1984.

== Description and history ==
The courthouse is located at the southeast corner of Court and High Streets, just north of Skowhegan's central business district. A modern court building, housing the local district court, stands across High Street to the north. The original 1873 portion of the building, oriented west toward Court Street, is a three-story brick structure with stone trim. It has a truncated hip roof that once sported a cupola (removed during the 1904 alterations), with a cornice that has heavy brackets. The front and sides each have slightly projecting central sections marked by corner brick pilasters, that in front topped by a gable roof. A single-story gable-roofed portico shelters the main entrance, supported by groups of chamfered granite posts. The upper two levels have windows set in tall round-arch openings.

To the rear of this main block stands a 1938 addition, two stories in height. Its entrance on the north side repeats details found in the main entrance, and the second-floor windows are also set in round-arch openings, not as elaborate as those of the original building. Brick pilasters and corbelling at the eave are also features repeated in the addition from the main block.

Somerset County was incorporated in 1809 from parts of Kennebec County, with its original county seat at Norridgewock. In 1872 the county seat was formally relocated to Skowhegan, provided that town could provide adequate space for county functions in a timely manner. Temporary space was deemed by the county commissioners to be inadequate, and a legal struggle ensued between the towns over the matter. This was resolved when former Governor of Maine Abner Coburn, a Skowhegan native and one of the state's wealthiest men, offered to pay for the construction of a courthouse in his hometown. The original portion of the main block was designed by local architect Charles F. Douglas, and was completed in 1873. In 1904 the noted Portland architect John Calvin Stevens oversaw a renovation and expansion of the building, in which two bays were added to the rear, matching in style Douglas' design, with a complete redesign of the interior. The building was then enlarged again in 1938.

== See also ==
- National Register of Historic Places listings in Somerset County, Maine
