= C. F. Douglas House =

Historic house in Maine, United States

- U.S. National Register of Historic Places
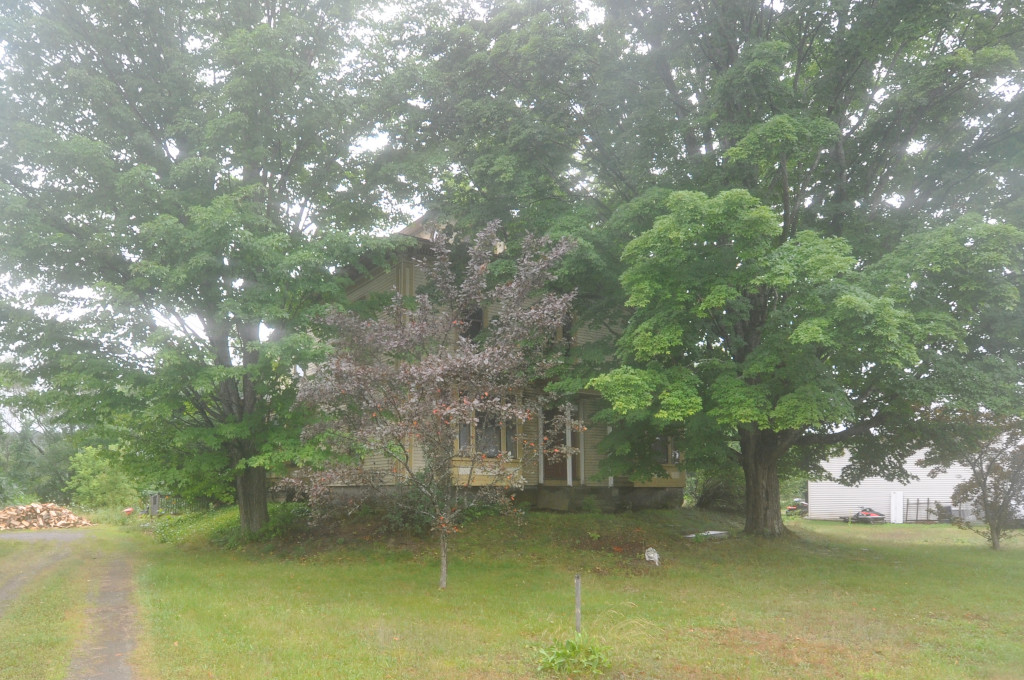

- Location within Maine Location within the United States
- Location: ME 8, Norridgewock, Maine
- Coordinates: 44°42′46″N 69°47′44″W
- Area: 1 acre (0.40 ha)
- Built: 1868
- Architect: Charles F. Douglas
- Architectural style: Italian Villa
- NRHP reference No.: 78000200
- Added to NRHP: December 18, 1978

The C. F. Douglas House is a historic house on United States Route 2/Maine State Route 8 in Norridgewock, Maine. The house, designed by local architect Charles F. Douglas for his family, was built in 1868, and is one of the region's finest examples of Italianate architecture, with ornate trim and a prominent three-story square tower. The house was listed on the National Register of Historic Places in 1978.

== Description and history ==
The Douglas house is a two-story wood-frame structure, finished with a gable roof, two interior brick chimneys, clapboard siding, and granite foundation. There are two main entrances to the house, one in an asymmetrically placed three-story tower on the east side of the building, and another on the south side of the house, facing the driveway. The two entrances are connected by a single-story wraparound porch supported by groups of ornately decorated square columns. Roof lines of the porch, main roof, and tower roof are dentillated and bracketed. Fenestration in the tower includes typically Italianate round-arch windows, including paired ones on each side at the top stage. The property includes a two-story carriage barn which has similar decorative style.

Charles F. Douglas was born in Brunswick, Maine, and was self-taught as an architect, opening a practice in Skowhegan in the 1860s. He designed this house for his family, and built it in 1868 on land belonging to his wife's family in Norridgewock. They lost the house to foreclosure the following year, and moved to Lewiston, where Douglas did some of his finest works, including Lewiston's Continental Mill. This house is a remarkably sophisticated expression of the Italianate style for a rural inland community in Maine; such buildings are more commonly found in coastal communities.

== See also ==
- National Register of Historic Places listings in Somerset County, Maine
