= Auburn, Maine =

City in Maine, United States

- City
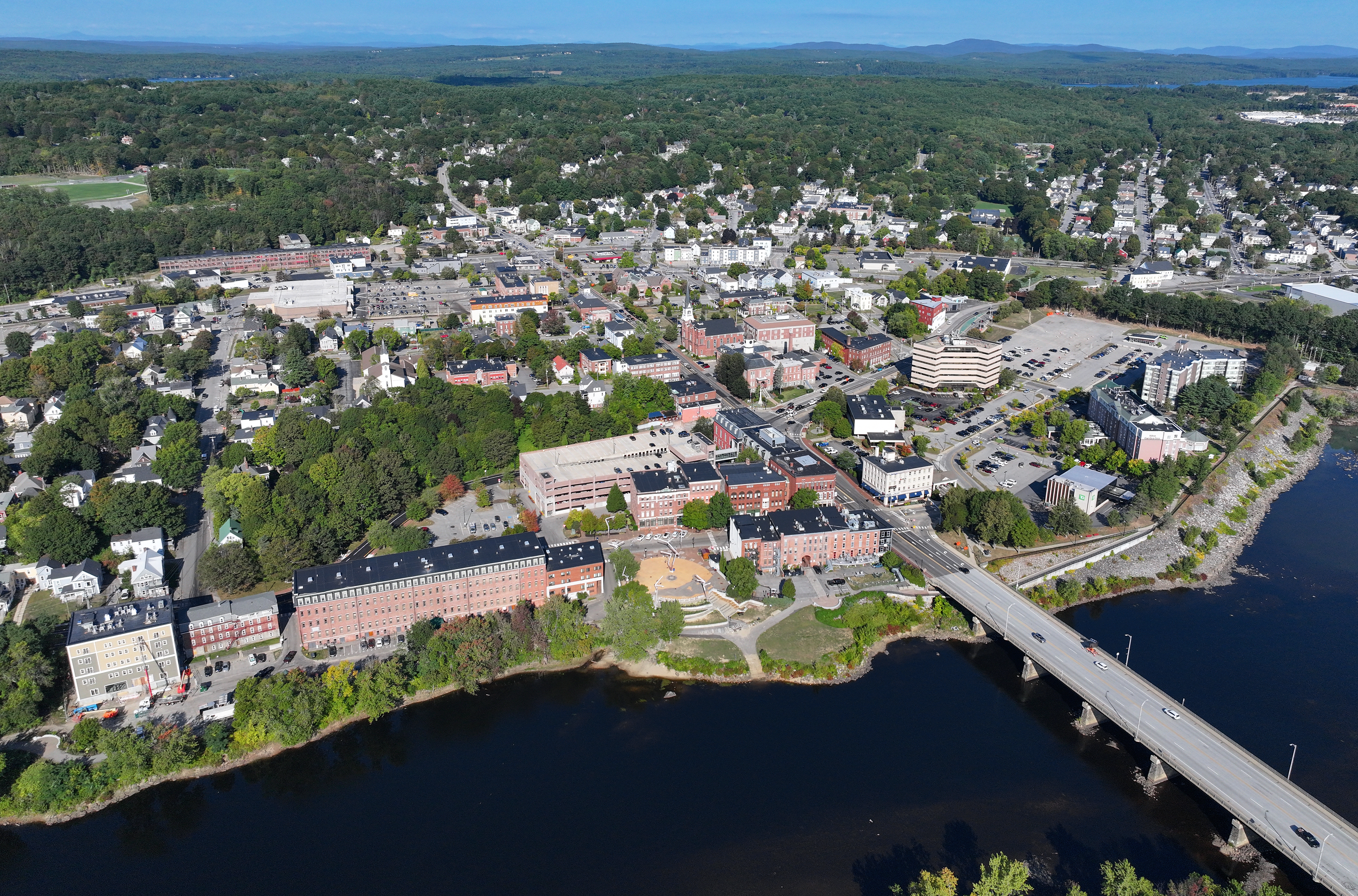

- Flag Seal
- Motto: Vestigia Nulla Retrorsum (Latin) "No Steps Backward"
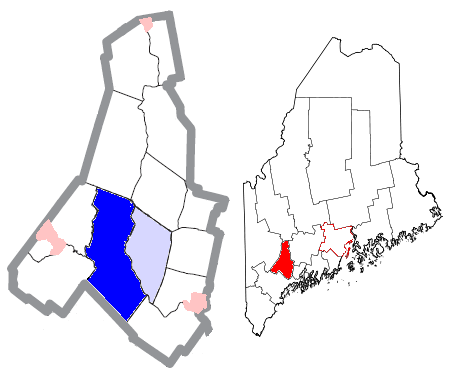
- Location of Auburn, Maine (in dark blue)

- Location in Maine Location in the United States
- Coordinates: 44°04′12″N 70°14′54″W
- Country: United States
- State: Maine
- County: Androscoggin
- Incorporated (town): February 24, 1842
- Incorporated (city): February 22, 1869
- Neighborhoods: Danville; East Auburn; Littlefield Corner; Marston Corner; New Auburn; North Auburn; Stevens Mill

Area
  - Total: 65.74 sq mi (170.27 km^{2})
  - Land: 59.34 sq mi (153.69 km^{2})
  - Water: 6.40 sq mi (16.58 km^{2})
- Elevation: 269 ft (82 m)

Population (2020)
  - Total: 24,061
  - Density: 405.5/sq mi (156.56/km^{2})
- Time zone: UTC−5 (Eastern)
  - Summer (DST): UTC−4 (Eastern)
- ZIP codes: 04210-04212
- Area code: 207
- FIPS code: 23-02060
- GNIS feature ID: 582333
- Website: www.auburnmaine.gov

Auburn is a city in south-central Maine, within the United States. Settled in the foothills of the Western Lakes and Mountains region of the state, the city serves as the county seat of Androscoggin County. The population was 24,061 at the 2020 census. Auburn and its sister city Lewiston are known locally as the Twin Cities or Lewiston–Auburn (L–A).

== History ==
The area was originally part of the Pejepscot Purchase, land bought in 1714 by an association of people from Boston and Portsmouth following the Treaty of Portsmouth, which brought peace between the Abenaki Indians and the settlers of present-day Maine. In 1736, however, the Massachusetts General Court granted a large section of the land to veterans of the 1690 Battle of Quebec. Conflicting claims led to prolonged litigation; consequently, settlement was delayed until after the French and Indian Wars.

Auburn was first settled in 1786 as part of Bakerstown, renamed Poland when it was incorporated by the Massachusetts General Court in 1795. It was then part of Minot, formed from parts of Poland and incorporated in 1802. Auburn would itself be formed from parts of Minot and incorporated on February 24, 1842. The name was apparently inspired by "Auburn", a village (real or fictitious) featured in the 1770 poem "The Deserted Village" by Oliver Goldsmith. Originally part of Cumberland County, the town became county seat of Androscoggin County at its creation in 1854. By annexing land from towns around it, including part of Poland in 1852, Minot in 1873, and all of Danville (first called Pejepscot) in 1867, Auburn grew geographically into one of Maine's largest municipalities. Incorporated as a city on February 22, 1869, Auburn in 1917 would be the first city in the state to adopt a council-manager form of government.

Farms supplied grain and produce, but with construction of the bridge across the river to Lewiston in 1823, and especially after arrival of the Atlantic and St. Lawrence Railroad from Portland in January 1848, the community developed into a mill town. Mills were built to operate by water power from falls on the Androscoggin River and Little Androscoggin River. In 1835, the factory system of shoe manufacture originated at Auburn. Other firms manufactured cotton and woolen textiles, carriages, iron goods, bricks and furniture. The population in 1860 was only about 4,000 but by 1890 it had tripled to 12,000 as a result of its shoe factories attracting many French Canadian immigrants, many of whom arrived by train from Quebec. Steady population growth continued until around 1960, plateauing at roughly 24,500.

In Auburn, shoe manufacturing became the dominant industry by the late 19th century. The City Seal, depicting a spindle with different types of shoes at each outside point, with the adopted latin motto Vestigia Nulla Retrorsum (loosely translated as "No Backward Steps"), was designed when Auburn was positioning itself as the shoe manufacturing center of Maine in the mid-19th century. In 1917, one factory in Auburn was producing 75 percent of the world's supply of white canvas shoes; however, after World War II the shoe industry began to decline, and between 1957 and 1961 the largest manufacturers closed their factories.

The area became noted in 1985 due to the plane crash that took the life of Samantha Smith.

In 2023, Joe Biden became the first sitting United States president to visit Auburn in 111 years, with the previous being William Howard Taft in 1912.

=== Lewiston-Auburn Shoe Strike ===
In 1937, one of the largest labor disputes in Maine history occurred in Lewiston and Auburn. The Lewiston-Auburn Shoe Strike lasted from March to June and at its peak involved 4,000 to 5,000 workers on strike. After workers attempted to march across the Androscoggin River from Lewiston to Auburn, Governor Lewis Barrows sent in the Maine Army National Guard. Some labor leaders, CIO Secretary Powers Hapgood, were imprisoned for months after a Maine Supreme Judicial Court judge issued an injunction seeking to end the strike.

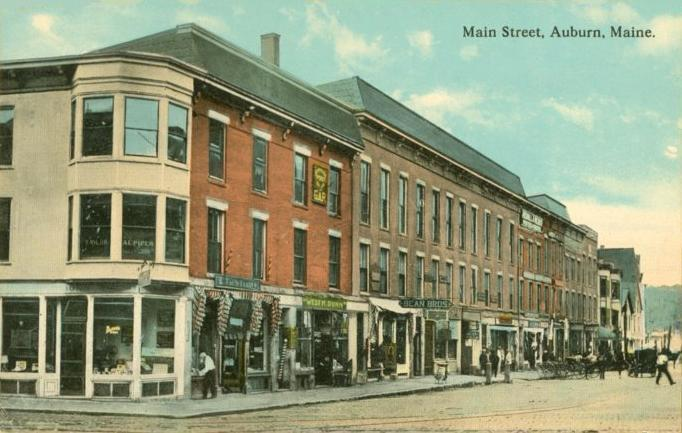
Main Street c. 1912

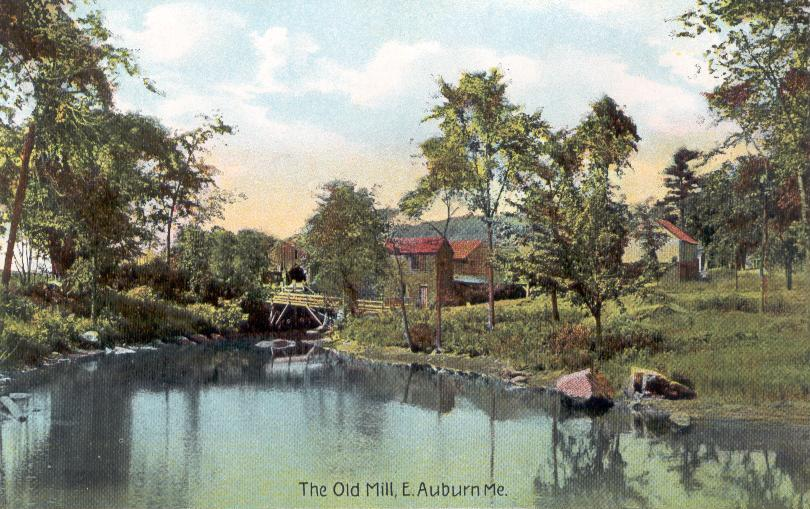
Old mill c. 1910

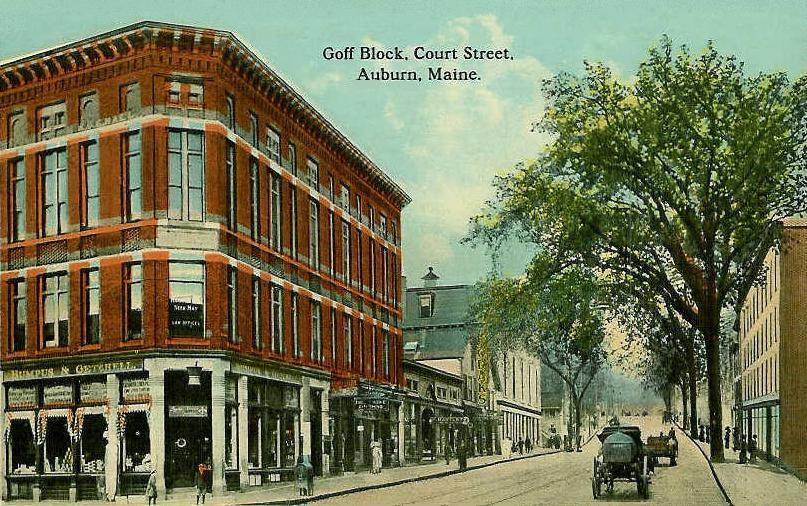
Court Street c. 1912

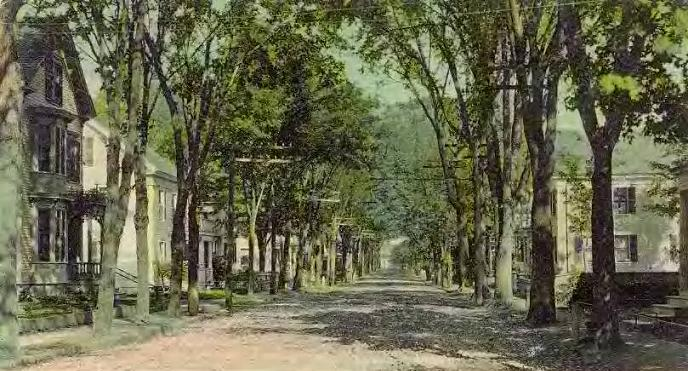
High Street in 1907

== Geography ==
According to the United States Census Bureau, the city has a total area of 65.74 square miles (170.27 km^{2}), of which 59.33 square miles (153.66 km^{2}) is land and 6.41 square miles (16.60 km^{2}) is water. Auburn is drained by the Little Androscoggin River and Androscoggin River.

== Demographics ==
Historical population
Census	Pop.	Note	%±
1850	2,840		—
1860	4,022		41.6%
1870	6,169		53.4%
1880	9,555		54.9%
1890	11,250		17.7%
1900	12,951		15.1%
1910	15,064		16.3%
1920	16,985		12.8%
1930	18,571		9.3%
1940	19,817		6.7%
1950	23,134		16.7%
1960	24,449		5.7%
1970	24,151		−1.2%
1980	23,128		−4.2%
1990	24,039		3.9%
2000	23,203		−3.5%
2010	23,055		−0.6%
2020	24,061		4.4%
2022 (est.)	24,193		0.5%

Auburn is one of two principal cities of and included in the Lewiston-Auburn, Maine metropolitan New England city and town area and the Lewiston-Auburn, Maine Metropolitan Statistical Area (which is part of the Portland-Lewiston-South Portland, Maine combined statistical area).

=== 2020 census ===
As of the 2020 census, Auburn had a population of 24,061. The median age was 41.8 years. 20.2% of residents were under the age of 18 and 20.7% of residents were 65 years of age or older. For every 100 females there were 91.5 males, and for every 100 females age 18 and over there were 89.2 males age 18 and over.

81.0% of residents lived in urban areas, while 19.0% lived in rural areas.

There were 10,030 households in Auburn, of which 25.9% had children under the age of 18 living in them. Of all households, 38.7% were married-couple households, 20.4% were households with a male householder and no spouse or partner present, and 30.3% were households with a female householder and no spouse or partner present. About 33.3% of all households were made up of individuals and 14.1% had someone living alone who was 65 years of age or older.

There were 11,000 housing units, of which 8.8% were vacant. The homeowner vacancy rate was 1.2% and the rental vacancy rate was 7.6%.

Racial composition as of the 2020 census
Race	Number	Percent
White	21,111	87.7%
Black or African American	1,076	4.5%
American Indian and Alaska Native	92	0.4%
Asian	237	1.0%
Native Hawaiian and Other Pacific Islander	12	0.0%
Some other race	210	0.9%
Two or more races	1,323	5.5%
Hispanic or Latino (of any race)	582	2.4%

=== 2010 census ===
As of the census of 2010, there were 23,055 people, 9,974 households, and 5,818 families living in the city. The population density was 388.6 inhabitants per square mile (150.0/km^{2}). There were 11,016 housing units at an average density of 185.7 per square mile (71.7/km^{2}). The racial makeup of the city was 93.7% White, 2.5% African American, 0.4% Native American, 0.9% Asian, 0.3% from other races, and 2.1% from two or more races. Hispanic or Latino of any race were 1.5% of the population.

There were 9,974 households, of which 29.1% had children under the age of 18 living with them, 39.9% were married couples living together, 13.0% had a female householder with no husband present, 5.4% had a male householder with no wife present, and 41.7% were non-families. 32.0% of all households were made up of individuals, and 12.8% had someone living alone who was 65 years of age or older. The average household size was 2.26 and the average family size was 2.84.

The median age in the city was 39.9 years. 22.1% of residents were under the age of 18; 8.6% were between the ages of 18 and 24; 26.1% were from 25 to 44; 27.9% were from 45 to 64; and 15.2% were 65 years of age or older. The gender makeup of the city was 48.3% male and 51.7% female.

=== 2000 census ===
As of the census of 2000, there were 23,203 people, 9,764 households, and 5,907 families living in the city. The population density was 388.1 inhabitants per square mile (149.8/km^{2}). There were 10,608 housing units at an average density of 177.4 per square mile (68.5/km^{2}). The racial makeup of the city was 97.04% White, 0.59% African American, 0.30% Native American, 0.59% Asian, 0.05% Pacific Islander, 0.10% from other races, and 1.32% from two or more races. Hispanic or Latino of any race were 0.73% of the population.

There were 9,764 households, out of which 29.4% had children under the age of 18 living with them, 44.9% were married couples living together, 11.6% had a female householder with no husband present, and 39.5% were non-families. 32.0% of all households were made up of individuals, and 13.2% had someone living alone who was 65 years of age or older. The average household size was 2.28 and the average family size was 2.88.

In the city, the population was spread out, with 23.2% under the age of 18, 8.1% from 18 to 24, 29.3% from 25 to 44, 22.2% from 45 to 64, and 17.1% who were 65 years of age or older. The median age was 38 years. For every 100 females, there were 90.5 males. For every 100 females age 18 and over, there were 86.9 males.

The median income for a family was $44,012. Males had a median income of $32,088 versus $22,349 for females. The per capita income for the city was $19,942. About 9.0% of families and 12.0% of the population were below the poverty line, including 16.6% of those under age 18 and 11.8% of those age 65 or over.

Voter registration

Voter Registration and Party Enrollment as of November 2022
Party	Total Voters	Percentage
Unenrolled	4,305	31.21%
Democratic	4,906	35.57%
Republican	3,880	28.13%
Green Independent	674	4.89%
Libertarian Party of Maine	28	0.20%
Total	13,793	100%

== Government ==
Auburn is in Maine's 2nd congressional district, Maine Senate District 20, and Maine House of Representatives Districts 68, 69, and 70.

Due to Auburn's relatively expansive land area, the city is divided up into five wards. The city's governing body is a City Council, consisting of a mayor and 7 councilmembers (one from each of the five wards, and two elected at large). The mayor is elected at large.

Auburn's current mayor is Jeff Harmon. John Jenkins was a former mayor and state senator from Auburn.

=== List of mayors ===
- Thos. Littlefield, 1869, 1871–1874
- S. P. Miller, 1870
- James Dingley, 1875–1876
- Hannibal R. Smith, 1877–1878
- Thomas Littlefield, 1879–1880
- Geo. S. Woodman, 1881–1883
- B. F. Sturgis, ca.1884-1885
- L. W. Haskell, 1885–1886
- Albert M. Penley, 1887–1888
- Albert R. Savage, 1889–1891
- Winchester G. Lowell, 1892
- W. W. Bolster, 1898
- Hillman Smith, 1894–1895
- Nathan W. Harris, 1896–1898
- Wm. H. Wiggin, 1899
- J. S. P. H. Wilson, 1900–1901
- Eben G. Eveleth, 1902–1908
- A. Q. Miller, 1904–1905
- David R. Hastings, 1906
- J. R. Webber, 1907
- Irving L. Merrill, 1908–1911
- Charles E. Williams, 1912
- Alvin W. Fowles, 1913–1914
- Henry R. Porter, 1916–1916
- Ralph F. Burnham, 1917–1919
- Henry E. Goss, 1920–1921
- Charles S. Cummings, 1922–1925
- Fred R. Walton, 1926–1929
- Lloyd H. McFadden, ca.1930-1933
- George C. Wing Jr., ca.1934-1935
- Ernest E. Estes, ca.1936-1937
- L. Kenneth Green, ca.1938-1944
- Rosaire L. Halle, ca.1949
- Edward M. Field, ca.1949-1953
- Merle Merrill, ca.1954
- Normand Guay, ca.2006
- John Jenkins, 2007–2009
- Richard Gleason, ca.2010
- Jason J. Levesque, ca.2017-2023
- Jeff Harmon, 2023–present

== Education ==
Public primary and secondary education is provided by the Auburn School Department, including Edward Little High School.

In addition, there are the following schools in the city:

- St. Dominic Regional High School, a Catholic high school
- Central Maine Community College, community college

== Media ==
=== Newspapers ===
- The Sun Journal prints a daily newspaper in two different editions statewide. The Sun Journal was the recipient of the 2008 New England Daily Newspaper of the Year and the 2009 Maine Press Association Newspaper of the Year.

== Transportation ==
=== Roads ===
- Interstate 95
- US Route 202
- State Route 11
- State Route 4
- State Route 121
- State Route 136
- State Route 122

=== By air ===
Auburn is the home of the Auburn-Lewiston Municipal Airport, located off Hotel Road.

=== Rail ===
Two freight railroads pass through the city. Pan Am Railways (formerly Springfield Terminal Railway and Maine Central Railroad) is the primary rail connection for the city. Pan Am's main line from Rotterdam Junction, New York to Northern Maine Junction, Maine closely parallels US Route 202 through much of Auburn. The St. Lawrence and Atlantic Railroad's main line from Portland to Montreal also runs through the southwestern section of the city, passing near the Auburn/Lewiston Municipal Airport; at Lewiston Junction, a branch leased from the Lewiston and Auburn Railroad runs northwest through Auburn. The branch formerly crossed the Androscoggin River into Lewiston.

== Sites of interest ==
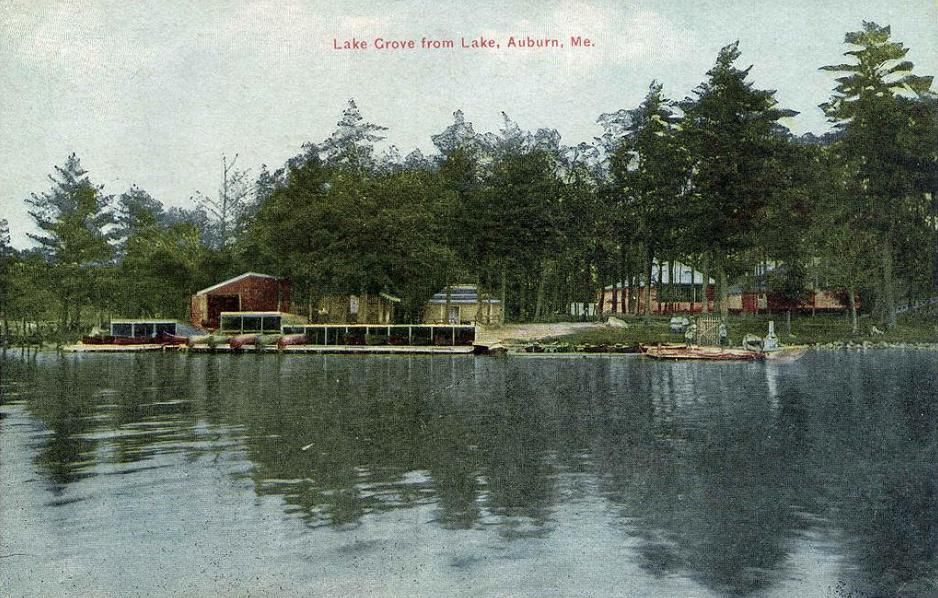
Lake Auburn in 1911

- Lost Valley Ski Area
- Mount Apatite Park
- Auburn Riverwalk
- Lake Auburn
- Festival Plaza, completed in 2002—public park and performance space along the Androscoggin River. Two public water sculptures designed by artist Ross Miller operate seasonally – the Falls Fountain, that references the Androscoggin River and Native American legends of being able to hide behind the falls; and the Shoe Fountain, a series of cast bronze shoes recalling the early shoe manufacturing history of the area. A map of the Androscoggin River is cast into the plaza with colored concrete.
- Hamster Point—Majestic river side gardens
- Auburn Mall
- Androscoggin Historical Society & Museum — artifacts of local history, Civil War memorabilia, farming tools and a bird collection
- Knight House Museum (1796) – the oldest frame house downtown, with a pre-1835 handwork shoe shop
- Auburn Fire Department Museum—a collection of antique fire equipment from the city
- Good Shepherd Food Bank distributes food to agencies across the state from its main warehouse in Auburn

== National Register of Historic Places ==
- A. A. Garcelon House (1890)
- Androscoggin County Courthouse and Jail (1857)
- Auburn Public Library (1903)
- Barker Mill (1873)
- Charles A. Jordan House (1880)
- Charles L. Cushman House (1889)
- Edward Little House (1827)
- Engine House (1879)
- First Universalist Church (1876)
- Frank L. Dingley House (1867)
- Free Baptist Church
- Gay-Munroe House (1878)
- Holman Day House (1895)
- Horace Munroe House (1899)
- Horatio G. Foss House (1914)
- Lamoreau Site
- Main Street Historic District
- Roak Block (1871)
- William A. Robinson House (1874)
- William Briggs Homestead (1797)

== Notable people ==
- Tony Atlas, wrestler
- John Bower, skier
- Lenny Breau, jazz guitarist
- Erwin Canham, American journalist and author
- Alonzo Conant, judge, Auburn Municipal Court (1946–1958)
- Aaron S. Daggett, last surviving Civil War general
- T. A. D. Fessenden, U.S. congressman
- Sara Mae Stinchfield Hawk, speech pathologist
- John Jenkins, mayor
- Adam R. Lee, state legislator
- Edward Little, philanthropist, educator
- Robert Luce, U.S. congressman
- Cynthia McFadden, correspondent for ABC News
- Dana T. Merrill, U.S. Army brigadier general
- Elmer Drew Merrill, botanist
- George Perkins Merrill, geologist
- Julie Parisien, skier
- Deborah Simpson, state legislator
- Billy Silverman, referee
- Charles Small, center fielder with the Boston Red Sox
- Olympia Snowe, U.S. senator and congresswoman
- Peter T. Snowe, Maine state legislator
- John H. Sturgis, Maine state legislator
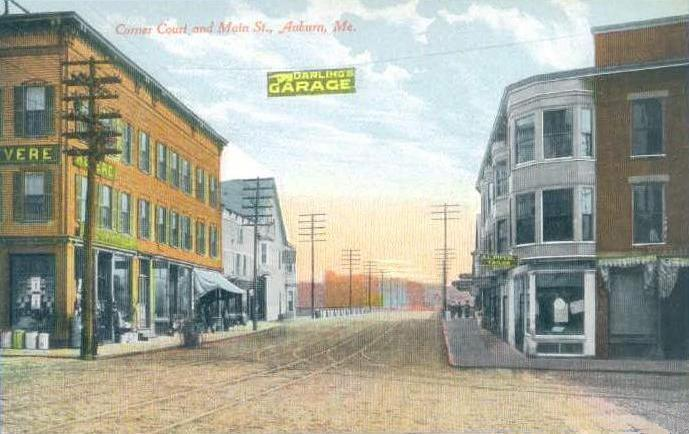
Corner of Court and Main streets c. 1908

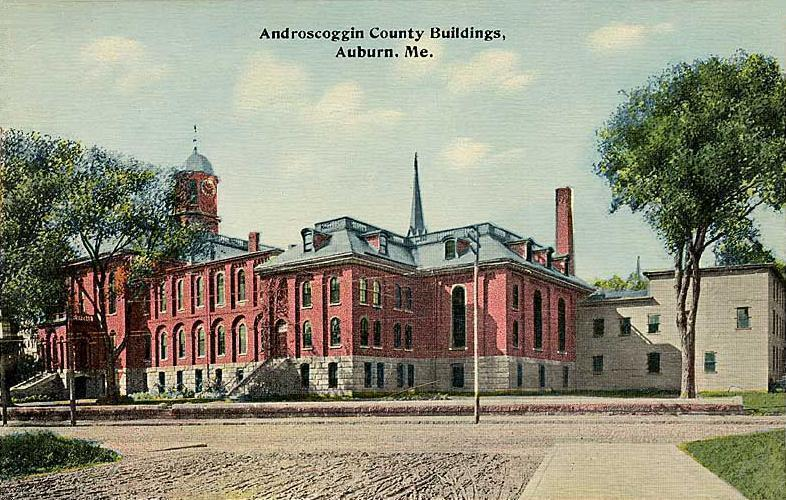
Androscoggin County Buildings c. 1912

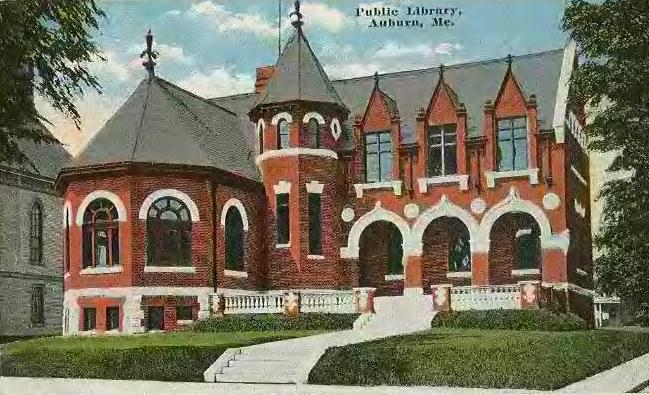
Auburn Public Library c. 1910
