= Bigelow-Page House =

Historic house in Maine, United States

- U.S. National Register of Historic Places
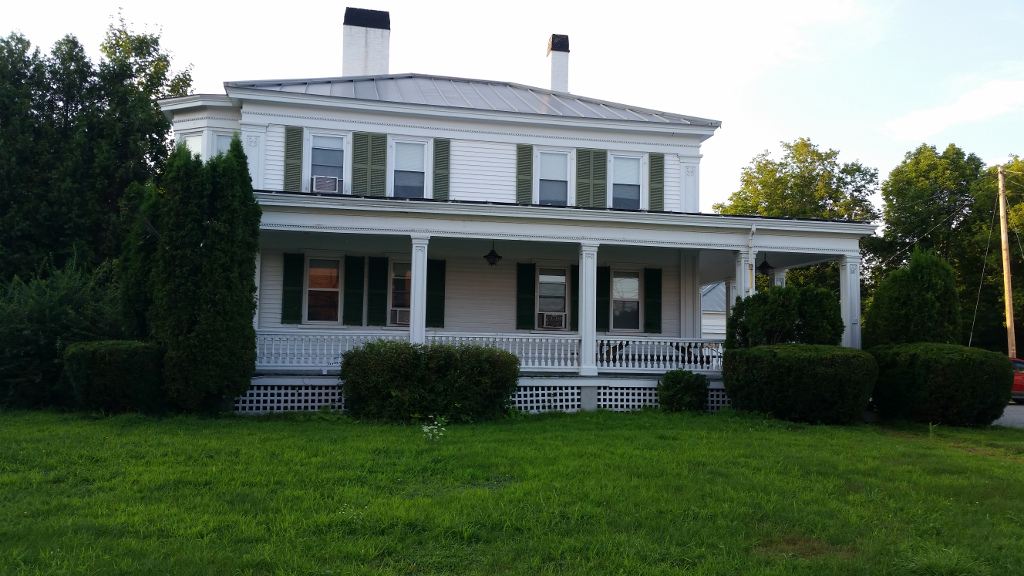

- Location within Maine Location within the United States
- Location: 30 High St., Skowhegan, Maine
- Coordinates: 44°46′10″N 69°43′13″W
- Area: less than one acre
- Built: 1846
- Architect: Joseph Bigelow
- Architectural style: Greek Revival
- NRHP reference No.: 88000395
- Added to NRHP: April 20, 1988

The Bigelow-Page House is a historic house at 20 High Street in Skowhegan, Maine, United States. Built in 1846–47 and substantially altered in the early 20th century, this expansive two-story wood-frame structure is a bold statement of Greek Revival architecture, and is an early work by a notable local master builder of the period, Joseph Bigelow. It was listed on the National Register of Historic Places in 1988.

== Description and history ==
The main block of the Bigelow-Page House is a roughly square two-story wood-frame structure, with a hip roof and two interior brick chimneys. A series of ells extend to the rear, connecting the main house to a gable-roofed barn with cupola. The main block has a single-story hip-roof porch wrapping around two sides, supported by paneled square posts. The corners of the main block are decorated by pilasters, and a broad entablature encircles the house below the roof line. The first ell is a fairly large two-story structure with Italianate features. The interior of house is stylistically diverse, reflecting the architectural trends also visible in the exterior. Original Greek Revival features are joined by an Italianate arched fireplace mantel, and a Colonial Revival bay window.

This house was built in 1846–47 by Joseph Bigelow for his own family. Bigelow (1804–83) had by then already acquired a reputation in the area for is high quality craftsmanship, having built a church in Bloomfield and the Symphony House in Bangor. He is also credited with building one of Skowhegan's other fine Greek Revival houses, the Gov. Abner Coburn House. Bigelow exchanged houses with lumberman Samuel Robinson in 1853, and the house was acquired in 1893 by Edward Page, whose family is responsible for the later Colonial Revival alterations.

== See also ==
- National Register of Historic Places listings in Somerset County, Maine
