= E. W. Moore =

E.W. Moore may refer to:

- Edwin Ward Moore (1810–1865), commander of the Texas Navy
- E. W. Moore Oval in Griffith, New South Wales where Group 20 Rugby League Grand Final matches are played
- Elbridge Willis Moore (1857–1938), American artist and photographer
- E.W. Moore, photographer of the Hodgdon Site petroglyphs
