= Temples Historic District =

Historic district in Maine, United States

- U.S. National Register of Historic Places
- U.S. Historic district
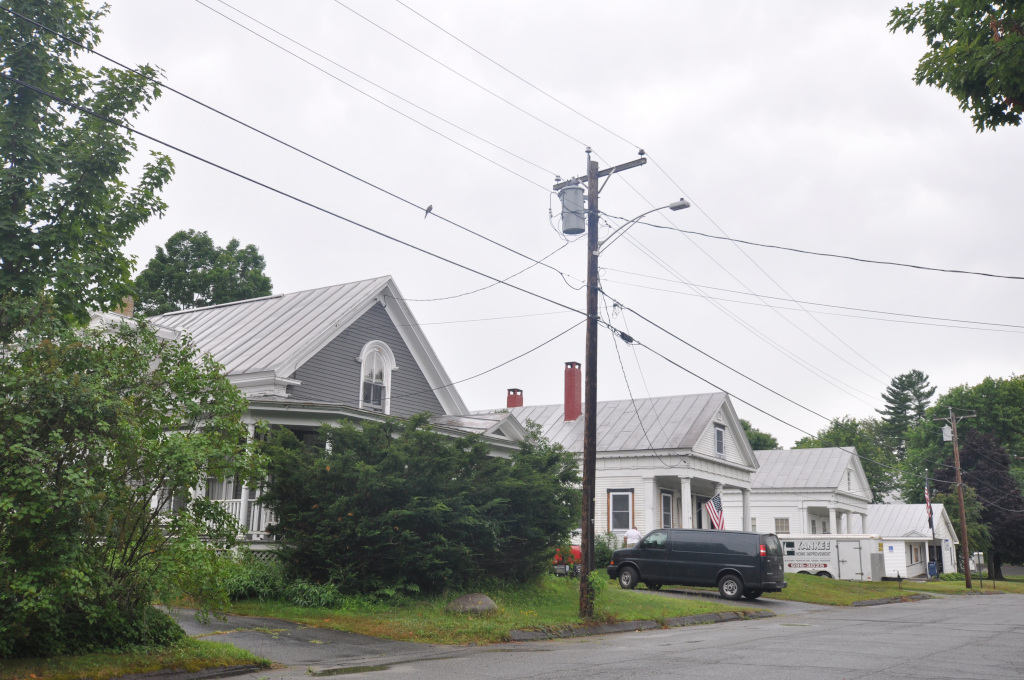

- Location within Maine Location within the United States
- Location: Madison Ave., North Anson, Maine
- Coordinates: 44°51′22″N 69°53′46″W
- Area: 1.5 acres (0.61 ha)
- Built: 1844
- Architect: Ebenezer Witherhill
- Architectural style: Greek Revival, Italianate
- NRHP reference No.: 83000474
- Added to NRHP: May 12, 1983

The Temples Historic District encompasses a distinctive collection of Greek Revival houses on Madison Street in the rural village of North Anson, Maine. Built between about 1844 and 1858 were four houses in a row, three of which exhibit classical Greek temple-front facades, and assemblage that is unique in the rural interior of the state. The district was listed on the National Register of Historic Places in 1983.

== Description and history ==
The village of North Anson is located on the north bank of the Carrabassett River, shortly before it empties into the Kennebec River in southern Somerset County, Maine. Madison Street extends eastward from the village center. On the south side of Madison Street stand four houses that are remarkably similar in construction and style. Three stand to the west of Winter Street, and one to the east. All are 1-1/2 stories in height, with wood framing and clapboard siding. All have a front-facing gable roof, and three of them have a Greek temple portico supported by three Doric columns. The two westernmost houses are virtually identical, with a detailed Doric entablature encircling the eave and an ornamented Greek Revival entrance surround. The house at the eastern end is similar to these, but has less detailing on the entablature and entrance surround. The fourth house lacks a temple front, although it may at one time have had one. It has thick pilasters at the corners and a simple entablature, and is fronted by a Colonial Revival porch. Its front facade is also finished in flushboard, and there is an Italianate round-arch window in the gable.

The exact date of construction of the houses is not known, nor is the identity of the (likely single) builder. They were probably built between about 1844 and 1852, late in the Greek Revival period. The house with Italianate features was owned by a carpenter, Ebenezer F. Witherill, and the other three were owned by businessmen and merchants. It is surmised that Witherill built all four houses, and added the Italianate features to his own house (removing its temple front) to showcase architectural fashion trends.

== See also ==
- National Register of Historic Places listings in Somerset County, Maine
