= Carrabasset Inn =

Historic inn in Maine, United States

- U.S. National Register of Historic Places
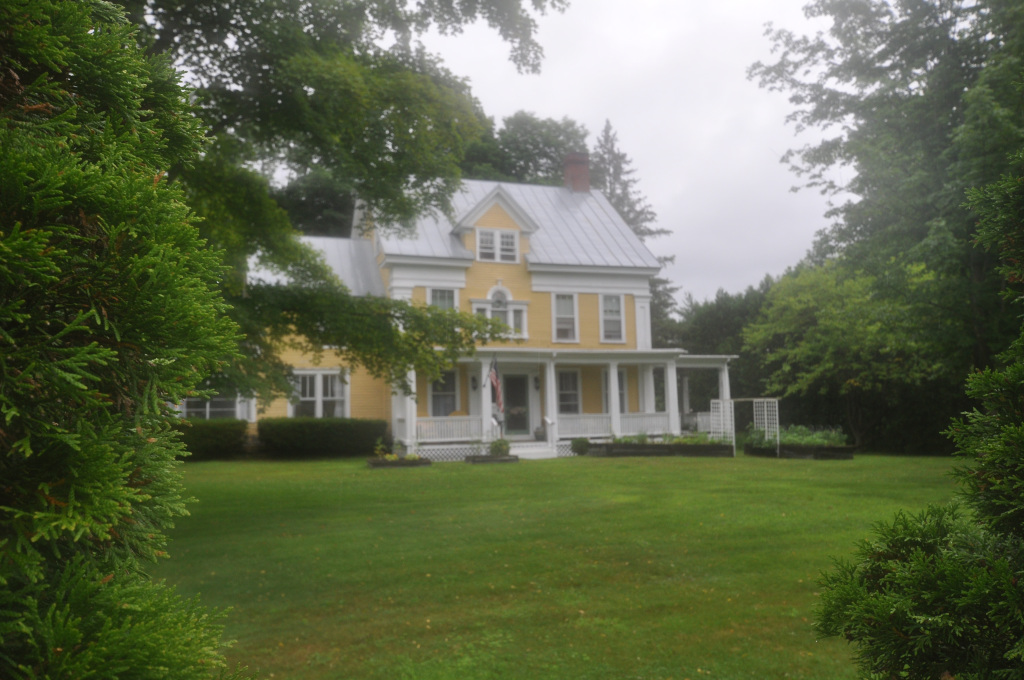

- Location within Maine Location within the United States
- Location: Jct. of Union St. and ME 8, North Anson, Maine
- Coordinates: 44°51′10″N 69°53′44″W
- Area: 3.8 acres (1.5 ha)
- Built: 1913
- Architectural style: Greek Revival, Colonial Revival, et al.
- NRHP reference No.: 00000376
- Added to NRHP: April 14, 2000

The Carrabasset Inn is a historic house at the northwest corner of the junction of Union Street (Maine State Route 234) and River Road (Maine State Route 8/U.S. Route 201A) in North Anson, Maine. Built as a private residence c. 1850, the house was altered significantly for use as a hotel after a fire devastated North Anson's business district, and served in that role as the village's only hotel into the 1940s. It now exhibits an architecturally distinctive blend of Greek Revival, Colonial Revival, and Craftsman styling. It was listed on the National Register of Historic Places in 2000. It is now a private residence.

== Description and history ==
The Carrabasset Inn is a tall 2 1/2-story wood-frame structure, four bays wide, with a front gable roof, and a porch that wraps around the east and south sides of the house. A recessed two story ell extends to the west. The main facade (facing Union Street to the south) has a Palladian window with stained and colored glass on the second level, and the main entrance is framed by pilasters and entablature. Above the Palladian window a gable section rises into the roof line. The corners of the building are highlighted by paired pilasters, and a broad entablature runs below the roof line. The interior of the house was extensively altered during the conversion of the house to a hotel, and features high quality Craftsman styling, with box beam ceilings and the use of stained and colored glass.

The construction date of the house is uncertain. Architectural assessment based on its Greek Revival features places it around 1850, and it had acquired many of its features by the time the first known photograph of it was taken in 1875. At that time, then main entrance faced east, toward River Road, and included a porch that only extended across the eastern facade. After the 1913 fire destroyed much of North Anson's central business district, including all of the area hotels, this house was immediately altered to serve as a hotel by N. W. Murphy, whose Somerset Hotel had been the community's largest. From then until the 1940s, when it finally closed, it served as the community's only known lodging facility. It was converted to a private residence thereafter, removing a portion of the rear wing to another site.

== See also ==
- National Register of Historic Places listings in Somerset County, Maine
