= Somerset Academy =

Somerset Academy may refer to:

- Somerset Academy Archaeological Site, in Princess Anne, Somerset county, Maryland, USA, former site of Somerset Academy, listed on the National Register of Historic Places (NRHP) in Maryland
- Somerset Academy (Athens, Maine), listed on the NRHP in Maine
- Somerset Academy (Pembroke Pines, Florida), a charter school in Florida
- Somerset Academy Silver Palms (Princeton, Florida). a charter school in Florida K-12
