= Bailey Farm Windmill =

- U.S. National Register of Historic Places
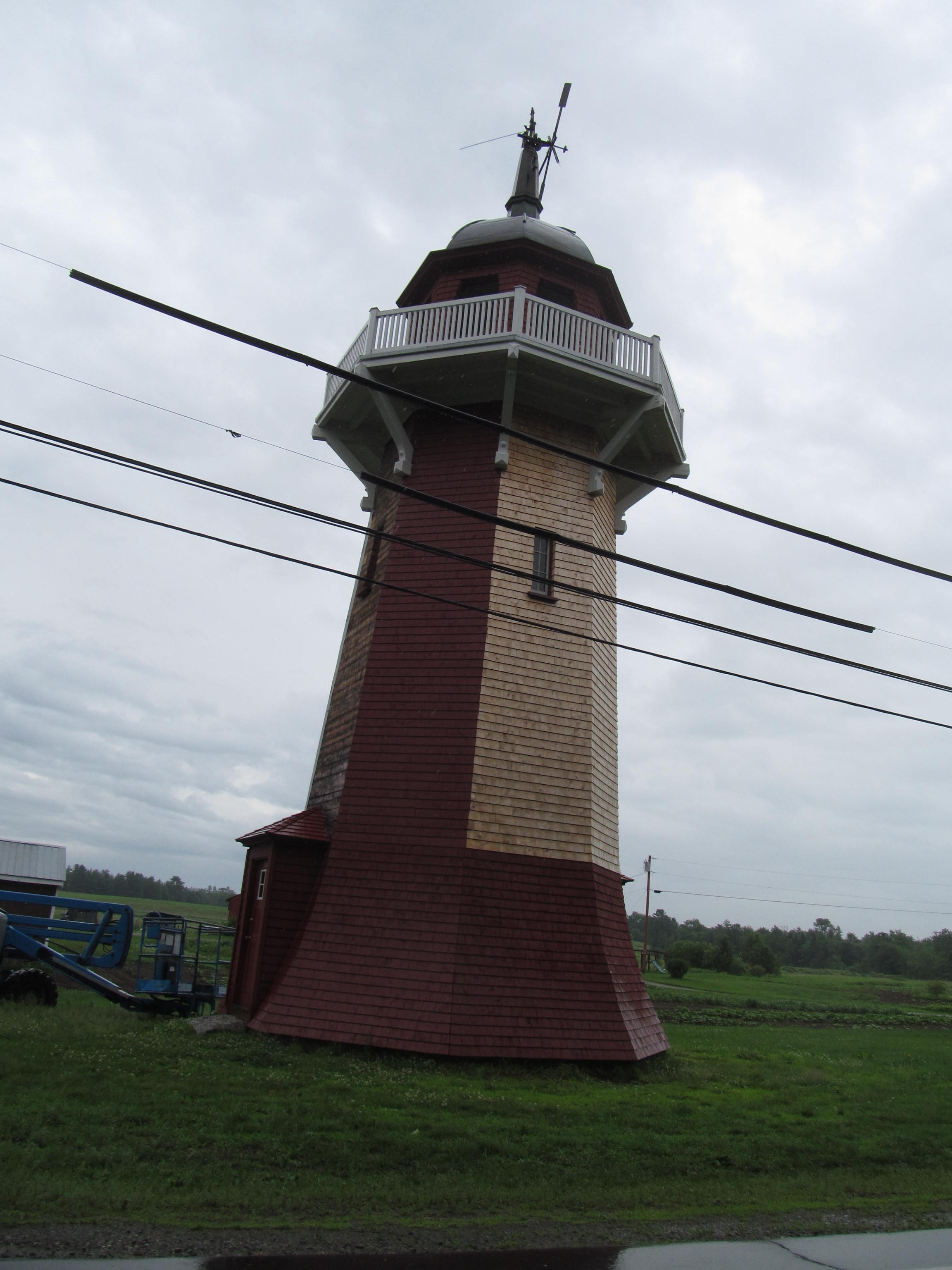

- Location within Maine Location within the United States
- Location: Anson, Maine, USA
- Coordinates: 44°51′45″N 69°55′49″W
- Built: 1905; 121 years ago
- NRHP reference No.: 88000885
- Added to NRHP: June 28, 1988; 38 years ago

The Bailey Farm Windmill is an historic windmill on Maine State Route 16, north of the village of North Anson, Maine. Built in 1905, it is an architecturally distinctive local landmark, with an octagonal frame and a copper-domed roof. It was listed on the National Register of Historic Places in 1988.

== Description and history ==
The windmill is an octagonal wood-frame structure, resting on a concrete foundation, with a wooden shingled exterior and a copper-domed roof. Its base is flared, with the entrance projecting slightly on the west-facing facade, under a gabled pediment. There are four small windows in the structure, all at different heights to provide light to the inside staircase. At the top of its interior is an observation area, which is surrounded on the outside by a broad gallery supported by sawn brackets. The dome is topped by a spire, on which are mounted the rotating mechanism and carriage of the mill. The wheel has retained its spokes, but no longer has paddles to catch the wind. This mechanism was originally connected to a central shaft, now removed, that lead down to a shallow dug well. The shaft was protected from the stairs by a tongue-and-groove partition.

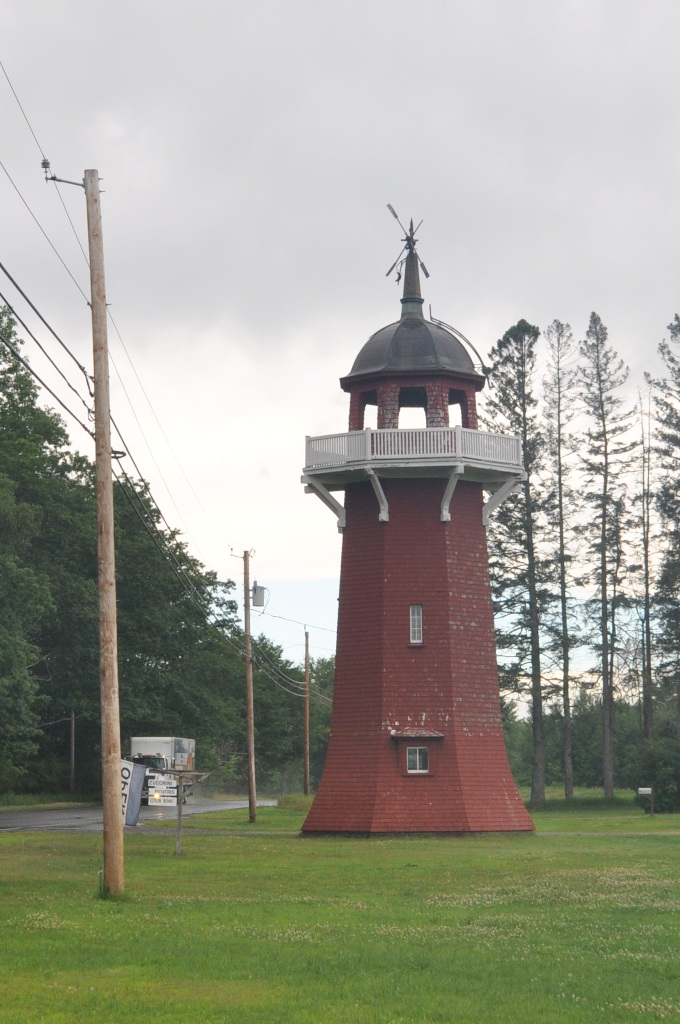
Windmill in 2022

The windmill was apparently built about 1905 on the farm of Benjamin and Chester Bailey, and is one of a very small number of agricultural windmills to survive in the state. It was apparently used by the Baileys and later owners until the 1920s, when the well pump was converted to gasoline power.

== See also ==
- National Register of Historic Places listings in Somerset County, Maine
