= Dudley House =

Dudley House may refer to:

- Dudley House, London, a Grade II* listed house in Mayfair, London, England

== United States ==
- Dudley House (Ventura, California)
- Jedidiah Dudley House, Old Saybrook, Connecticut, Middlesex County, Connecticut
- Dudley Farm, Newberry, Florida, Alachua County, Florida
- Dudley's Corner School House, Skowhegan, Maine
- Elson-Dudley House, Meridian, Mississippi
- Dudley House (Exeter, New Hampshire)
- Dudley, Guildfor, Sr., and Anne Dallas, House, Forest Hills, Tennessee, listed on the NRHP in Tennessee
- Gwin Dudley Home Site, Wirtz, Virginia, listed on the NRHP in Virginia
- Dudley House (Harvard College), the former name of the Dudley Community, at the time, a mixed undergraduate and graduate house at Harvard College
