= Samuel Weston =

Samuel Weston may refer to:

- Samuel Weston (politician) (died 1716), English politician
- Samuel Burns Weston (1855– 1936), American Unitarian minister and editor

== See also ==
- Samuel Weston Homestead, a historic house in Skowhegan, Maine
- Sam Weston, original stage name of Anthony Spinelli, American actor and producer
