= History House =

History House may refer to the following houses:

- History House, Skowhegan in Maine, USA
- History House, Sydney, a heritage-listed building in Sydney, New South Wales, Australia
