= Steward–Emery House =

Historic house in Maine, United States

- Formerly listed on the U.S. National Register of Historic Places
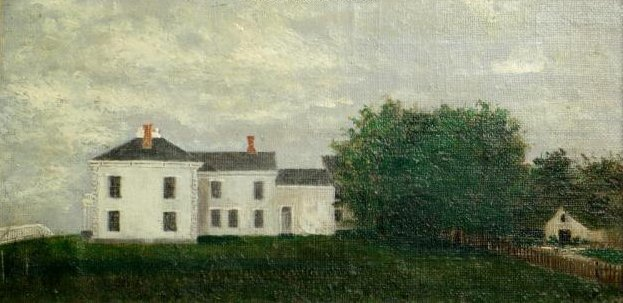
- 1870 painting of the house

- Location within Maine Location within the United States
- Location: Main St., .25 mi. N of jct. with ME 16, North Anson, Maine
- Coordinates: 44°51′24″N 69°53′52″W
- Area: 3 acres (1.2 ha)
- Built: 1870
- Architect: Kieler, Wallentine
- Architectural style: Colonial Revival, Italianate
- NRHP reference No.: 92001705

Significant dates
- Added to NRHP: December 17, 1992
- Removed from NRHP: March 21, 2023

The Steward–Emery House is a historic house in North Anson, Maine. It is a handsome Italianate house, built c. 1870 with Colonial Revival alterations early in the 20th century. The house is most notable for the large amount of high-quality trompe-l'œil artwork on its walls, which is among the finest known domestic examples in the state. The property was listed on the National Register of Historic Places in 1992, and was burnt down in 2019 from a stove fire, and destroyed in 2023

== Description and history ==
The Steward–Emery House is located on the west side of North Main Street (Maine State Routes 8 and 16), just north of Madison Street and south of the Carrabec Community School, on the northern fringe of North Anson village. it consists of a roughly square main block, connected via ells of decreasing size to a large carriage barn; the entire complex forms an L shape. The main house has a truncated hip roof topped by a low balustrade at the center. The walls are finished in clapboards, with quoined corners. The front facade, facing east, is three bays wide, with a central entrance sheltered by an ornate portico with chamfered posts and elliptical arches. Above the entrance are paired round-arch windows; the remaining bays have sash windows. The south facade of the main block has an enclosed Colonial Revival porch extending across most of hits length. Unfortunately, in 2019 a house fire caused by a space heater took the life of the resident, and left the house in disrepair. It has since been torn down.

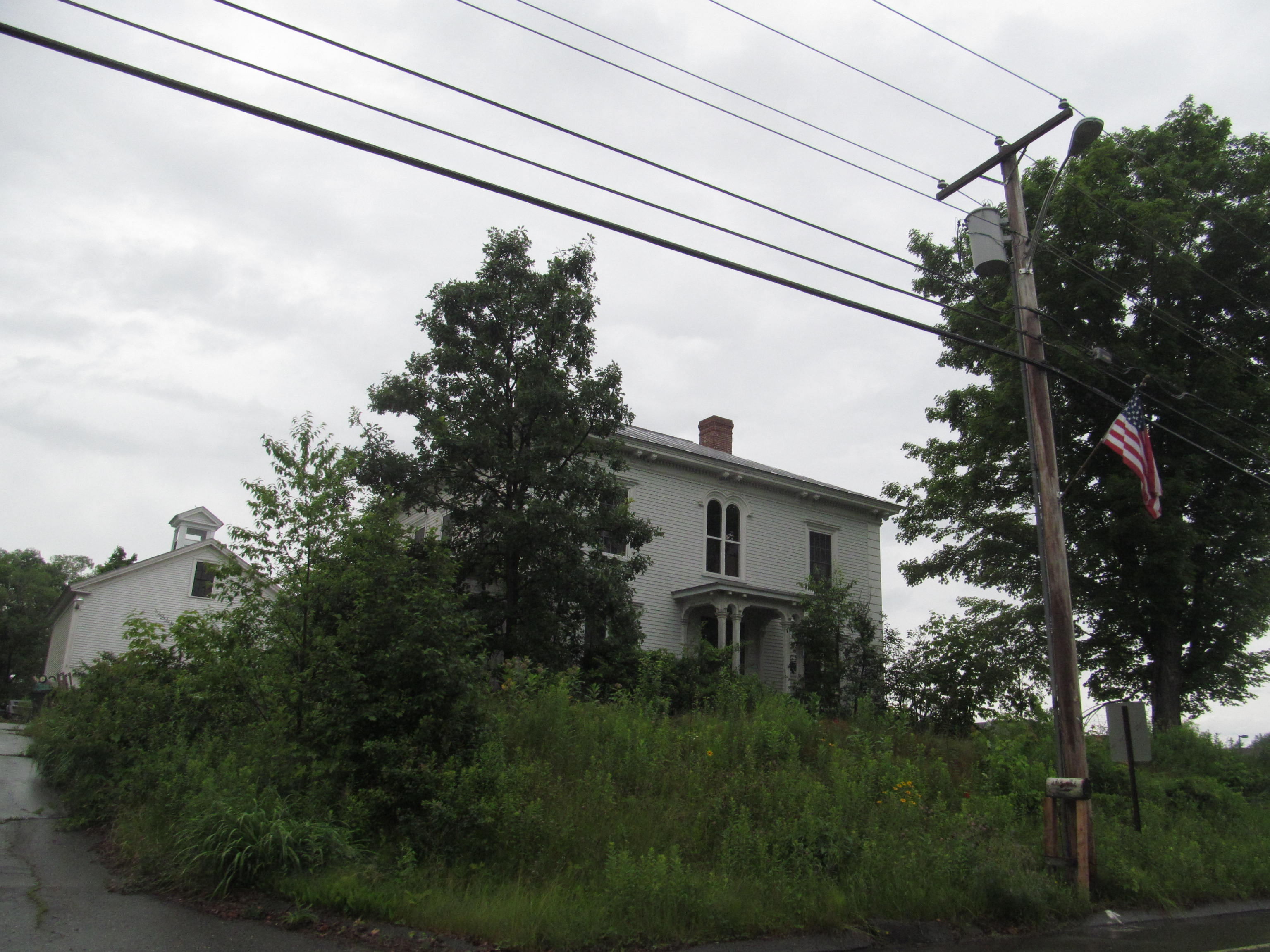
The house in 2014

The building interior follows a central-hall plan, with high-quality woodwork and marble fireplace surrounds on the first floor. The hall, from the ground floor to the attic, has been painted with an extensive and extremely well-preserved trompe-l'œil fresco that includes elements painted to resemble woodwork paneling, elaborate cartouches, and a richly detailed cornice. Some of the downstairs chambers have also retained portions of this fresco work. The frescoes are believed to be the work of a Danish artist named Wallentine L. Keiler (b. 1840) whose name is painted on an attic post. The paintings rival in sophistication, and exceed in quality of preservation, all other documented examples of this type of work in the state, including several notable examples in Portland.

The house was built about 1870 for Marcellus Steward, a businessman about whom is little known. He purchased what is believed to be this property in 1866 (deed research is unclear), and is presumed to have built the house soon afterward. The Colonial Revival additions, included the porch on the south side and enlarged windows on the front, were made by his daughter's family.

== See also ==
- National Register of Historic Places listings in Somerset County, Maine
