= Anson Grange No. 88 =

- Anson Grange #88
- U.S. National Register of Historic Places
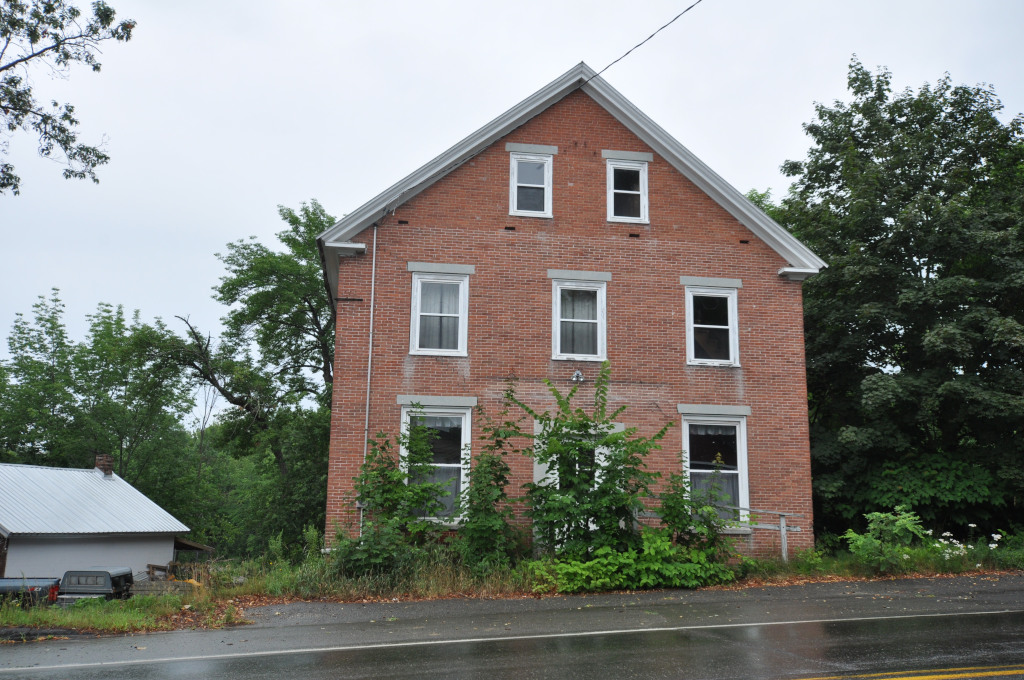

- Location within Maine Location within the United States
- Location: 10 Elm St., North Anson, Maine
- Coordinates: 44°51′16″N 69°53′55″W
- Area: 0.1 acres (0.040 ha)
- Built: 1849
- Architectural style: Greek Revival
- NRHP reference No.: 04000371
- Added to NRHP: April 28, 2004

The Anson Grange No. 88 is a historic commercial building and Grange hall at 10 Elm Street in North Anson, Maine. With a construction history dating to 1849, it is North Anson's oldest commercial building, and the only one to survive a pair of fires that devastated the community in 1863 and 1913. Since 1906 it has served the local Grange chapter, and the community in general as a social venue. It was listed on the National Register of Historic Places in 2004.

== Description and history ==
The Grange hall is a 2-1/2 story structure built in two stages. The front of the building, which was built first, is a brick structure, three bays wide and also three deep, with a granite foundation, while the rear section is a wood frame structure two bays deep, resting on a fieldstone foundation with granite caps. The building is set on a steep hillside overlooking the Carrabasset River, and has a full basement under about 2/3 of the full structure, which was originally used as a stable.

The interior has been completely altered from the building's original commercial orientation to provide facilities for the organizations that use it. These were substantially completed in 1905, and include a ticket window, kitchen, and large dining room, with an auditorium occupying most of the second floor. These alterations fairly seamlessly integrated the two portions of the building.

The front portion of the hall was built c. 1849 by Joseph Merry, who leased the premises to a dry goods merchant. In 1863 a fire swept through North Anson, destroying most of the village center but stopping just short of this building. In 1883 Merry sold the building to M. Steward, who operated a livery stable and harness operation. It was purchased by the recently established No. 88 Grange in 1901, and was renovated to meet their needs over the next few years. The Grange has opened its hall to all manner of community organizations, as well as hosting private functions such as dances and weddings.

== See also ==
- National Register of Historic Places listings in Somerset County, Maine
