= National Register of Historic Places listings in Somerset County, Maine =

Location of Somerset County in Maine

This is a list of the National Register of Historic Places listings in Somerset County, Maine.

This is intended to be a complete list of the properties and districts on the National Register of Historic Places in Somerset County, Maine, United States. Latitude and longitude coordinates are provided for many National Register properties and districts; these locations may be seen together in a map.

There are 60 properties and districts listed on the National Register in the county, including 1 National Historic Landmark.

This National Park Service list is complete through NPS recent listings posted May 1, 2026.

Contents: Counties and municipalities in Maine
Androscoggin - Aroostook - Cumberland (City of Portland) - Franklin - Hancock - Kennebec - Knox - Lincoln - Oxford - Penobscot - Piscataquis - Sagadahoc - Somerset - Waldo - Washington - York

== Current listings ==
	Name on the Register	Image	Date listed	Location	City or town	Description
1	Anson Grange No. 88	Anson Grange No. 88	April 28, 2004 (#04000371)	10 Elm St. 44°51′16″N 69°53′55″W	North Anson	
2	Arnold Trail to Quebec	Arnold Trail to Quebec	October 1, 1969 (#69000018)	Along the Kennebec River, through Wayman and Flagstaff lakes along the Dead River and Chain of Ponds to Quebec, Canada; 45°10′22″N 70°02′32″W	Bingham	Extends through Franklin, Kennebec, Sagadahoc, and Somerset counties
3	Bailey Farm Windmill	Bailey Farm Windmill	June 28, 1988 (#88000885)	State Route 16; 44°51′45″N 69°55′49″W	North Anson	
4	Asa Bates Memorial Chapel	Asa Bates Memorial Chapel	October 31, 2002 (#02001272)	2 Ten Lots Rd. 44°35′29″N 69°41′51″W	Fairfield Center	
5	Bigelow-Page House	Bigelow-Page House	April 20, 1988 (#88000395)	20 High St. 44°46′10″N 69°43′13″W	Skowhegan	
6	Bingham Free Meetinghouse	Bingham Free Meetinghouse	June 3, 1976 (#76000113)	S. Main St. (U.S. Route 201); 45°03′08″N 69°52′58″W	Bingham	
7	Birch Island House		March 7, 1996 (#96000246)	Birch Island; 45°35′15″N 70°25′36″W	Holeb	
8	Bloomfield Academy	Bloomfield Academy	February 19, 1982 (#82000778)	Main St. 44°45′37″N 69°43′04″W	Skowhegan	
9	Caratunk Falls Archeological District	Caratunk Falls Archeological District	May 30, 1986 (#86001200)	Address Restricted	Solon	
10	Carrabasset Inn	Carrabasset Inn	April 14, 2000 (#00000376)	Junction of Union St. and State Route 8; 44°51′10″N 69°53′44″W	North Anson	
11	Gov. Abner Coburn House	Gov. Abner Coburn House	July 30, 1974 (#74000193)	Main St. 44°45′43″N 69°43′00″W	Skowhegan	
12	Concord Haven	Concord Haven	October 2, 1992 (#92001297)	Eastern side of State Route 16, 1.7 miles (2.7 km) north of its junction with Berry Rd. 44°58′34″N 69°52′42″W	Embden	
13	Connor-Bovie House	Connor-Bovie House	January 18, 1974 (#74000321)	22 Summit Street; 44°35′14″N 69°36′03″W	Fairfield	
14	Cotton-Smith House	Cotton-Smith House	June 18, 1992 (#92000794)	42 High St. 44°35′11″N 69°36′02″W	Fairfield	
15	C. F. Douglas House	C. F. Douglas House	December 18, 1978 (#78000200)	State Route 8; 44°42′46″N 69°47′44″W	Norridgewock	
16	Dudley's Corner School House	Dudley's Corner School House	July 15, 2002 (#02000787)	5 Dudley Corner Rd. 44°46′20″N 69°40′34″W	Skowhegan	
17	Eaton School	Eaton School	June 23, 1988 (#88000884)	Junction of Main St. and Mercer Rd. 44°42′48″N 69°47′55″W	Norridgewock	
18	Embden Town House	Embden Town House	October 16, 1989 (#89001704)	Cross Town Rd. 44°54′42″N 69°55′57″W	Embden	
19	The Evergreens	The Evergreens	February 8, 1982 (#82000779)	Ferry Street; 44°56′17″N 69°52′03″W	Solon	Archaeological site, on the Evergreens Campground property
20	First Baptist Church, Former	First Baptist Church, Former	June 21, 1991 (#91000770)	Western side of Main St., south of State Route 104; 44°45′37″N 69°43′03″W	Skowhegan	
21	Founders Hall	Founders Hall	October 9, 1979 (#79000167)	S. Main St. 44°46′46″N 69°23′14″W	Pittsfield	The central campus building of Maine Central Institute.
22	Gerald Hotel	Gerald Hotel	March 25, 2013 (#12000894)	151-157 Main St. 44°35′13″N 69°35′43″W	Fairfield	
23	Amos Gerald House	Amos Gerald House	June 24, 1980 (#80000252)	107 Main St. 44°35′05″N 69°35′54″W	Fairfield	
24	Gould House	Gould House	February 19, 1982 (#82001886)	31 Elm St. 44°46′01″N 69°43′23″W	Skowhegan	
25	Hinckley Good Will Home Historic District	Hinckley Good Will Home Historic District	January 9, 1987 (#87000232)	U.S. Route 201; 44°40′05″N 69°37′59″W	Hinckley	
26	History House	History House	December 29, 1983 (#83003677)	40 Elm St. 44°45′56″N 69°43′32″W	Skowhegan	
27	Hodgdon Site		April 23, 1980 (#80000253)	Address Restricted	Embden	
28	Samuel Holden House	Samuel Holden House	December 14, 1995 (#95001459)	Eastern side of U.S. Route 201, 0.25 miles (0.40 km) north of its junction with an MDOT road 45°39′04″N 70°15′54″W	Moose River	
29	Ingalls House	Ingalls House	June 5, 1975 (#75000110)	Main St. 44°40′39″N 69°56′18″W	Mercer	
30	Kromberg Barn	Kromberg Barn	January 22, 2009 (#08001357)	Eastern side of E. Pond Rd., across from 462 E. Pond Rd. 44°37′08″N 69°46′10″W	Smithfield	
31	Lakewood Theater	Lakewood Theater	June 18, 1975 (#75000111)	On the banks of Lake Wesserunsett; 44°49′53″N 69°46′38″W	Madison	
32	Lawrence Library	Lawrence Library	December 31, 1974 (#74000322)	33 Lawrence Avenue; 44°35′16″N 69°36′10″W	Fairfield	
33	Madison Public Library	Madison Public Library	January 5, 1989 (#88003022)	Old Point Ave. 44°47′46″N 69°52′48″W	Madison	
34	Maine Spinning Company Mill	Maine Spinning Company Mill	June 20, 2022 (#100007808)	7 Island Ave. 44°45′50″N 69°43′12″W	Skowhegan	
35	Maine Women's Reformatory Maternity Hospital and Nursery		June 6, 2024 (#100010425)	26 Mary Street; 44°45′38″N 69°44′20″W	Skowhegan	
36	Sophie May House	Sophie May House	October 8, 1976 (#76000114)	Sophie May Lane; 44°43′04″N 69°48′03″W	Norridgewock	
37	Mercer Union Meetinghouse	Mercer Union Meetinghouse	January 9, 2007 (#06001223)	Main St., 0.1 miles (0.16 km) west of its junction with U.S. Route 2; 44°40′37″N 69°55′54″W	Mercer	
38	Moose River Congregational Church	Moose River Congregational Church	October 8, 1998 (#98001234)	Junction of U.S. Route 201 and Nichols Rd. 45°38′24″N 70°15′43″W	Jackman	
39	New Portland Wire Bridge	New Portland Wire Bridge	January 12, 1970 (#70000065)	Wire Bridge Rd. over the Carrabassett River; 44°53′27″N 70°05′37″W	New Portland	
40	Norridgewock Archeological District	Norridgewock Archeological District	April 12, 1993 (#93000606)	Three sites in Madison, Starks, and Norridgewock; 44°46′01″N 69°53′00″W	Norridgewock, Madison and Starks	
41	Norridgewock Female Academy	Norridgewock Female Academy	March 7, 1996 (#96000244)	Northern side of U.S. Route 2, 0.05 miles (0.080 km) west of its junction with Upper Main Street; 44°42′48″N 69°47′54″W	Norridgewock	Now owned by the Norridgewock Historical Society.
42	Norridgewock Free Public Library	Norridgewock Free Public Library	February 4, 1982 (#82000780)	Sophie May Lane; 44°43′04″N 69°47′56″W	Norridgewock	
43	Old Point and Sebastian Rale Monument	Old Point and Sebastian Rale Monument	April 2, 1973 (#73000147)	South of Madison off Alternate U.S. Route 201; 44°46′08″N 69°53′17″W	Madison	
44	Pittsfield Public Library	Pittsfield Public Library	January 4, 1983 (#83000471)	Main St. 44°46′55″N 69°26′50″W	Pittsfield	
45	Pittsfield Railroad Station	Pittsfield Railroad Station	January 23, 1980 (#80000254)	Central St. 44°46′57″N 69°23′02″W	Pittsfield	
46	Pittsfield Universalist Church	Pittsfield Universalist Church	July 14, 1983 (#83000472)	N. Main and Easy Sts. 44°47′03″N 69°22′55″W	Pittsfield	
47	Pittston Farm	Pittston Farm	July 10, 2000 (#00000762)	Western end of Seboomook Lake at its confluence with the south branch of the Penobscot River; 45°53′39″N 69°57′47″W	Pittston Academy Grant	
48	Quincy Building	Quincy Building	October 4, 1978 (#78000330)	South of Hinckley; 44°39′45″N 69°37′40″W	Hinckley	
49	Skowhegan Fire Station	Skowhegan Fire Station	October 20, 1983 (#83003679)	Island Ave. 44°45′50″N 69°43′09″W	Skowhegan	
50	Skowhegan Free Public Library	Skowhegan Free Public Library	April 14, 1983 (#83000473)	9 Elm St. 44°45′58″N 69°43′15″W	Skowhegan	
51	Skowhegan Historic District	Skowhegan Historic District	February 19, 1982 (#82000781)	Madison Ave., Water St. and Russell St. 44°45′57″N 69°43′05″W	Skowhegan	
52	Somerset Academy	Somerset Academy	July 19, 1984 (#84001499)	Academy St. 44°55′37″N 69°40′18″W	Athens	
53	Somerset County Courthouse	Somerset County Courthouse	November 8, 1984 (#84000332)	Court St. 44°45′59″N 69°43′10″W	Skowhegan	
54	South Solon Meetinghouse	South Solon Meetinghouse	June 16, 1980 (#80000255)	5 miles (8.0 km) southeast of Solon; 44°54′47″N 69°46′44″W	Solon	
55	Spaulding House	Spaulding House	December 18, 1978 (#78000201)	Main St. 44°42′51″N 69°47′45″W	Norridgewock	
56	Temples Historic District	Temples Historic District	May 12, 1983 (#83000474)	Madison Ave. 44°51′22″N 69°53′46″W	North Anson	
57	Henry Knox Thatcher House		October 29, 2002 (#02001273)	Old State Route 3 and Elm St. 44°40′40″N 69°56′03″W	Mercer	
58	Weston Homestead	Weston Homestead	November 23, 1977 (#77000086)	North of Madison on Weston Ave. 44°49′13″N 69°52′13″W	Madison	
59	Samuel Weston Homestead	Samuel Weston Homestead	November 10, 1980 (#80000256)	South of Skowhegan on U.S. Route 201; 44°44′50″N 69°39′55″W	Skowhegan	
60	Young Surgical Building-Central Maine Sanatorium	Young Surgical Building-Central Maine Sanatorium	June 28, 2021 (#100006674)	50 Mountain Ave. 44°36′23″N 69°35′59″W	Fairfield	

== Former listings ==
	Name on the Register	Image	Date listed	Date removed	Location	City or town	Description
1	Steward-Emery House	Steward-Emery House	December 17, 1992 (#92001705)	March 21, 2023	Main St., 0.25 miles (0.40 km) north of its junction with State Route 16; 44°51′24″N 69°53′52″W	North Anson	

== See also ==
- List of National Historic Landmarks in Maine
- National Register of Historic Places listings in Maine
