= Asa Bates Memorial Chapel =

Historic church in Maine, United States

- U.S. National Register of Historic Places
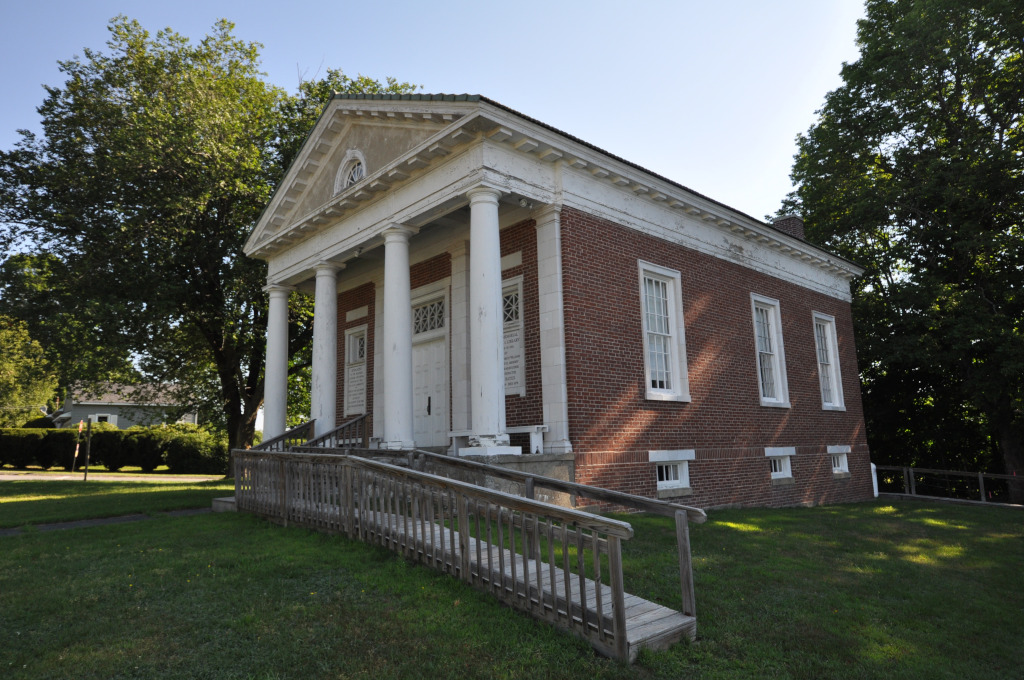

- Location within Maine Location within the United States
- Location: 2 Ten Lots Road, Fairfield, Maine
- Coordinates: 44°35′29″N 69°41′51″W
- Area: 0.4 acres (0.16 ha)
- Built: 1918
- Architectural style: Classical Revival
- NRHP reference No.: 02001272
- Added to NRHP: October 31, 2002

The Asa Bates Memorial Chapel, also known as the Ten Lots Chapel, is a historic church and community center at 2 Ten Lots Road in Fairfield, Maine. The Classical Revival brick building was built in 1916-18 by Milton LaForest Williams, who was raised in the community by his grandfather, Asa Bates, and was one of its major early 20th-century benefactors. It is the most architecturally imposing building in the small community, and was listed on the National Register of Historic Places in 2002.

== Description and history ==
The Bates Chapel is a single-story brick building, with an imposing Roman temple front supported by four Doric columns. They support an entablature that continues around the sides of the building, and which is topped by a modillioned gable pediment with a half-round fan window at its center. The facade underneath the temple front is three bays wide, separated by marble pilasters. The entrance, in the central bay, is topped by a square diamond-grilled transom, and framed by a simple marble surround. The side elevations each have three tall windows, set above small basement windows. A small gable-roofed brick extension projects from the center of the rear elevation.

The entrance leads into a vestibule area, with a library room to the side, which occupies about one-third of the building. The rear two-thirds of the building are taken up by an auditorium, separated from the vestibule by sliding mahogany doors. The interior walls and ceiling are plastered, joined by coved plasterwork in the auditorium. Stairs lead from the vestibule down to the basement, which houses a large open room, from which a kitchen area is partitioned.

The Ten Lots area was settled in 1774, and is roughly divided between the towns of Fairfield and Oakland. Milton LaForest Williams was raised in this community by his grandfather, Asa Bates (1794-1878), and he gave this building to the community as a church and community center. Williams died in 1919, and is interred in Oakland's Lake View Cemetery, which was also a target of his gifts. It is not known who designed the building.

== See also ==
- National Register of Historic Places listings in Somerset County, Maine
