= Pittsfield Universalist Church =

Historic church in Maine, United States

- U.S. National Register of Historic Places
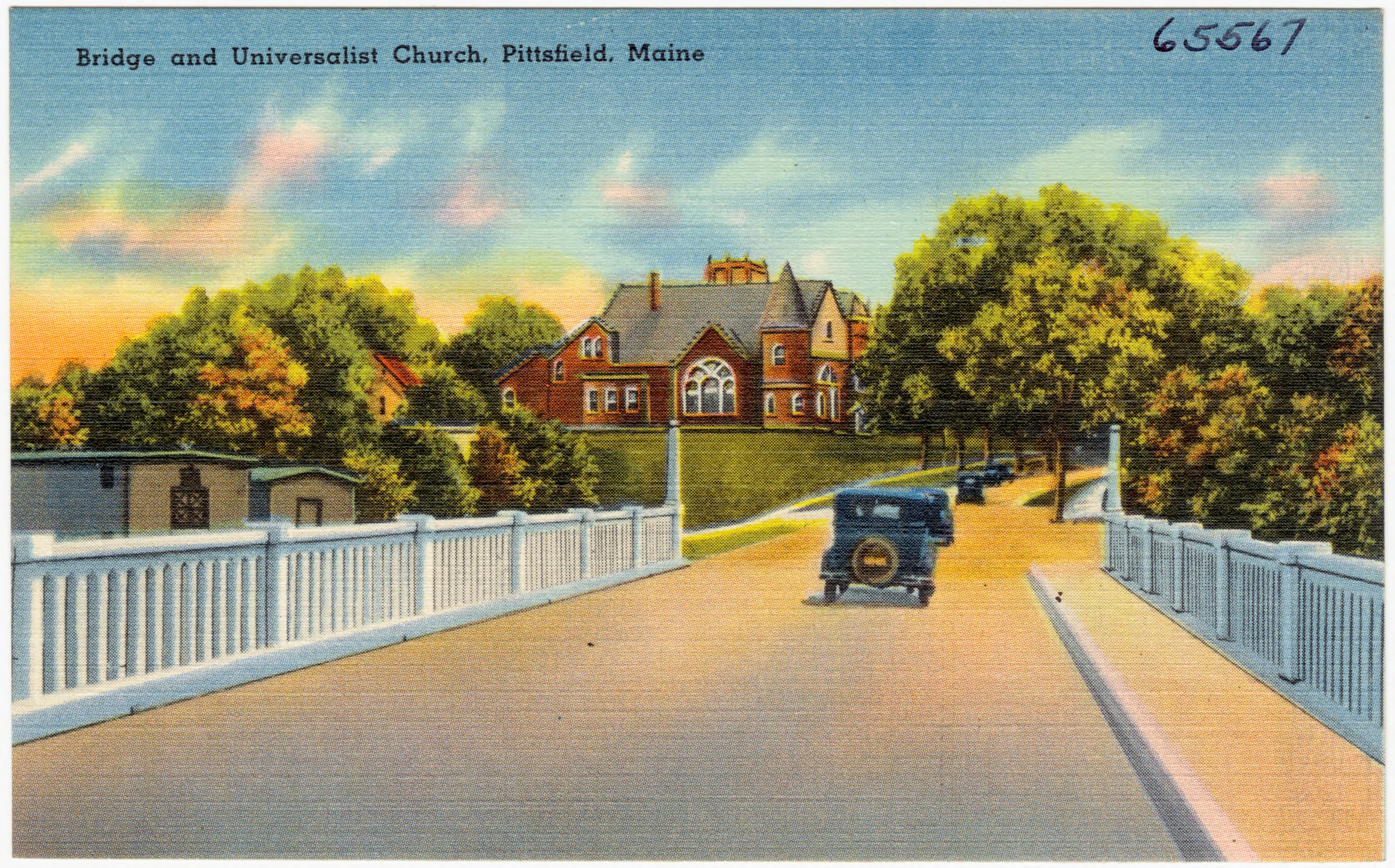
- Postcard view c. 1930s

- Location within Maine Location within the United States
- Location: N. Main and Easy Sts., Pittsfield, Maine
- Coordinates: 44°47′3″N 69°22′55″W
- Area: 0.5 acres (0.20 ha)
- Built: 1898
- Architect: Hatch, Frederick E.
- Architectural style: Queen Anne
- NRHP reference No.: 83000472
- Added to NRHP: July 14, 1983

Pittsfield Universalist Church is a historic church at 112 Easy Streets in Pittsfield, Maine. Built in 1898–99 with parts dating to 1857, it is one of the town's finest examples of Queen Anne architecture and is noted for its artwork and stained glass. The building was listed on the National Register of Historic Places in 1983.

== Description and history ==
The Pittsfield Universalist Church is set on the east side of Main Street in the center of Pittsfield, just north of its junction with Easy Street (from which it is accessed by vehicle). It is a 2 1/2-story T-shaped wood-frame structure with its main sanctuary oriented east–west. The top of the T, attached to the sanctuary at its eastern end, houses a meeting space, parlor, and vestry. It is the congregation's original 1857 sanctuary, moved and rotated, and extensively altered during the construction of the present sanctuary.

Three modestly-scaled towers are attached to these structures. At the southeastern junction of the two sections is the largest tower, which was originally more elaborately detailed, but is now topped by a gable roof; it houses the building's main entrance. At the southwestern end of the sanctuary stands a second square tower, and lower third rounded third tower is at the northeast of the sanctuary.

The interior of the church is noted for its artwork and stained glass. The ceilings are adorned with frescoes painted by Henry H. Cochrane, a prolific Maine artist who decorated numerous churches in the state. The stained glass windows of the sanctuary were designed by Redding, Baird and Co. of Boston, Massachusetts. The interior is unique in the state for these features and its excellent state of preservation.

== See also ==
- National Register of Historic Places listings in Somerset County, Maine
