= Pittsfield station (Maine) =

- Pittsfield Railroad Station
- U.S. National Register of Historic Places
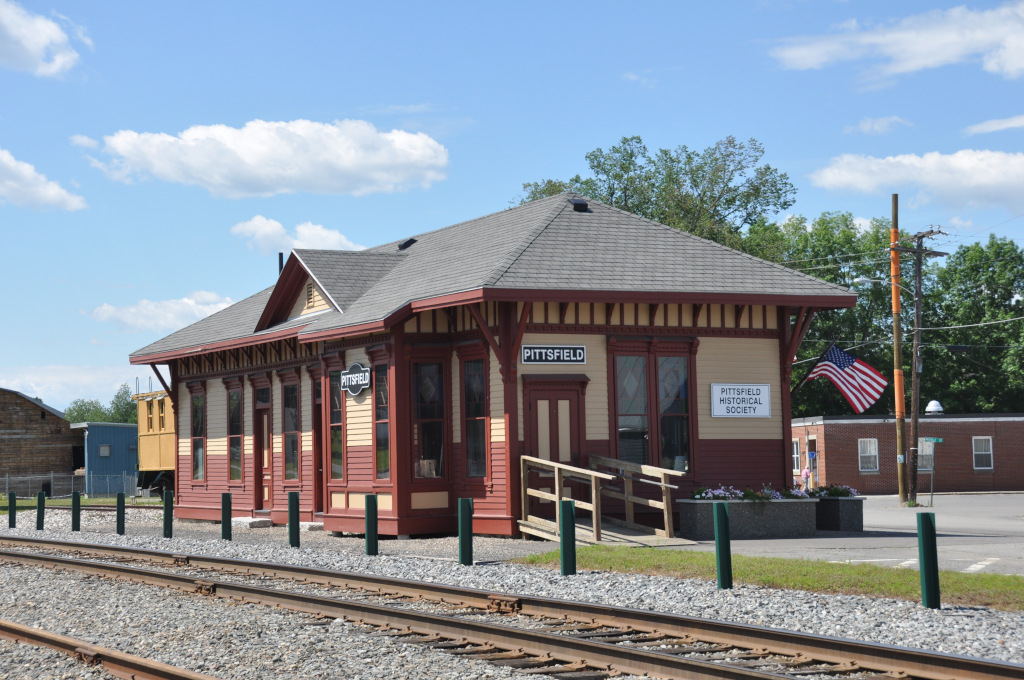
- Pittsfield station in July 2022

- Location within Maine Location within the United States
- Location: Central Street, Pittsfield, Maine
- Coordinates: 44°46′57″N 69°23′2″W
- Area: less than one acre
- Built: 1888
- Architectural style: Stick/Eastlake, Italianate
- NRHP reference No.: 80000254
- Added to NRHP: January 23, 1980

Pittsfield station is a former railroad station in Pittsfield, Maine. The station was built in 1888 by the Maine Central Railroad, and now serves as the Depot House Museum, operated by the Pittsfield Historical Society. It is one of the best-preserved railroad stations in Maine from that time period. The building was listed on the National Register of Historic Places on January 23, 1980, as Pittsfield Railroad Station.

== Description and history ==
The Pittsfield depot is set on the north side of the railroad tracks that run east–west on the southern outskirts of the town center. The building is a single-story wood frame structure, with clapboard siding. Its main facade faces toward the tracks to the south, and is nine bays wide, with a succession of windows and doorways, and a rectangular projection. The building has a hip roof, with a gable at the center of the main facade, and extended eaves with Stick style brackets and a paneled entablature. The building has retained all of its original windows, which are distinguished by patterned colored glass in the upper sashes.

The first railroad to arrive in Pittsfield was the Maine Central Railroad in 1855, providing service to Bangor and Waterville. In 1886 the Sebasticook and Moosehead Railroad built a spur line from Pittsfield to Hartland, significantly increasing the activity level at the station. The Maine Central built this station in 1888. There was originally an exchange house located at the west end of the station, to facilitate the transfer of goods from one line to the other; this has since been demolished.

The station is now owned by the town, and operated by the Pittsfield Historical Society as a museum.

== See also ==
- National Register of Historic Places listings in Somerset County, Maine

Preceding station	Maine Central Railroad	Following station
Burnham toward Portland	Main Line	Detroit toward Bangor
