= Moose River Congregational Church =

Historic church in Maine, United States

- U.S. National Register of Historic Places
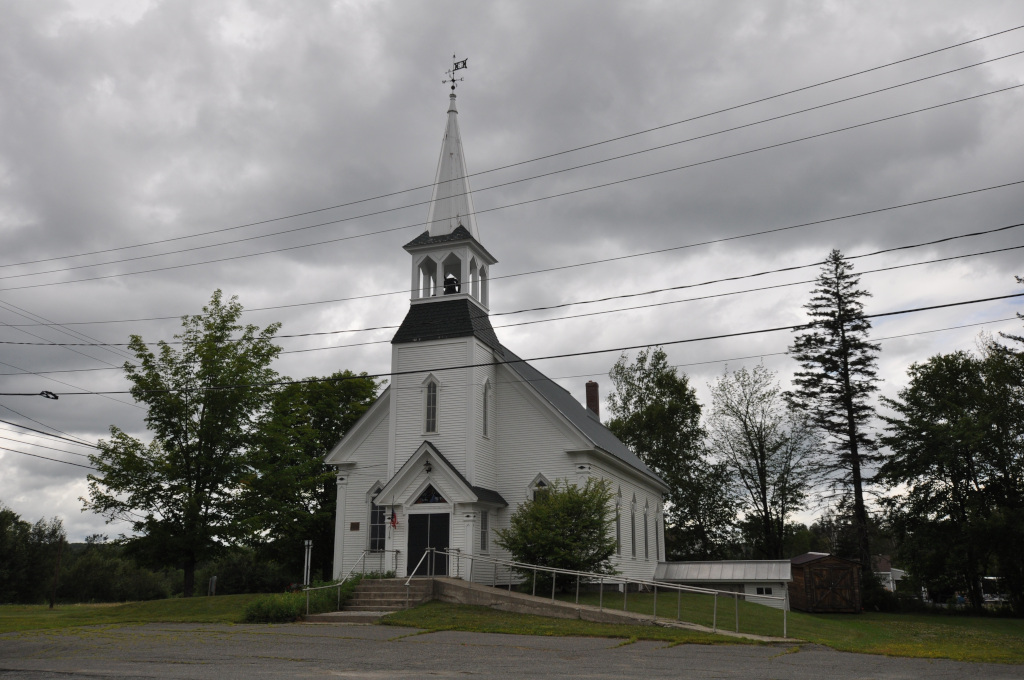

- Location within Maine Location within the United States
- Location: 2 Heald Stream Rd., Jackman, Maine
- Coordinates: 45°38′24″N 70°15′43″W
- Area: less than one acre
- Built: 1891
- Architectural style: Late Gothic Revival
- NRHP reference No.: 98001234
- Added to NRHP: October 08, 1998

Moose River Congregational Church is a historic church at 2 Heald Stream Road (corner of United States Route 201) in Jackman, Maine. The church congregation is affiliated with the United Church of Christ. The congregation meets in an 1891 Gothic Revival building that has served it since the congregation was established in 1890. The building was listed on the National Register of Historic Places in 1998.

== Description and history ==
The Moose River Congregational Church is set at the northeast corner of Heald Stream Road and US 201 near the northern end of Jackman village. It is a basically rectangular single-story wood-frame structure, with a metal gable roof and a projecting tower and vestibule section at the south-facing front. The front is symmetrically arranged with paneled corner pilasters and narrow pointed-arch windows flanking the projecting section. The entry also has corner pilasters, and a gable-roof pediment matching the main roof line in details. A double-leaf door is topped by a line of dentil moulding, above which is a triangular stained glass window. The second stage of the tower above the entrance is simple, with narrow pointed-arch window on three sides and slender corner pilasters. Above this is a section of pyramidal roofing, finished with wood shingles, some of which are decoratively cut. An open belfry stands above that, each side of the square tower consisting of a pair of pointed-arch openings. The steeple rises above to a weathervane.

Although the Jackman area was settled in 1820, it did not have regular religious services for many years, seeing only visits by itinerant ministers. By the late 1880s the population had grown sufficiently to support a call for the construction of a church, and the Moose River congregation formally organized in June 1890. The present church was built in 1890-91 and formally dedicated in 1892. It is architecturally distinctive as a local example of Gothic Revival architecture, and demonstrates an architectural transition toward more fully integrating the tower into the main church structure.

== See also ==
- National Register of Historic Places listings in Somerset County, Maine
