= Henry Knox Thatcher House =

Historic house in Maine, United States

- U.S. National Register of Historic Places
- Location within Maine Location within the United States
- Location: Main and Elm Sts., Mercer, Maine
- Coordinates: 44°40′40″N 69°56′3″W
- Area: 3 acres (1.2 ha)
- Built: 1826
- Architect: Joseph Campbell
- Architectural style: Federal, Greek Revival
- NRHP reference No.: 02001273
- Added to NRHP: October 29, 2002

The Henry Knox Thatcher House is a historic house at Main and Elm Streets in Mercer, Maine. Built c. 1826, the building is a fine blend of late Federal and Greek Revival styling. It is most significant as the longtime home of Henry Knox Thatcher, an admiral in the United States Navy during the American Civil War. The property was listed on the National Register of Historic Places in 2002.

== Description and history ==
The Thatcher House stands at the northeast corner of Main and Elm Streets, on the eastern edge of Mercer's rural village center. The main block is a 2 1/2-story wood-frame structure, five bays wide, with a side-gable roof, clapboard siding, and a granite foundation. It faces west, toward the village and Elm Street. The main entrance is centered, with flanking sidelights and simple Greek Revival trim. An ell extends east, joining the main house to a small stable that has been converted into garage. The interior of the house follows a typical Federal period center hall plan, with the front rooms on both floors trimmed in Greek Revival styling, and the rear rooms retaining Federal styling.

The house was built in stages beginning sometime between 1818 and 1826. The rear ell of the house that Joseph Campbell sold to Henry Knox Thatcher in 1832 was probably built in that time; Campbell built the main house between 1826 and 1832. Thatcher, the grandson of American Revolutionary War general Henry Knox, served in the United States Navy for more than 50 years, rising to the rank of rear admiral. His most active period of service was during the American Civil War, where he commanded squadrons engaged in blockading Confederate ports, and directed the naval activities in the First and Second Battles of Fort Fisher.

== See also ==
- National Register of Historic Places listings in Somerset County, Maine
