= Connor-Bovie House =

Historic house in Maine, United States

- U.S. National Register of Historic Places
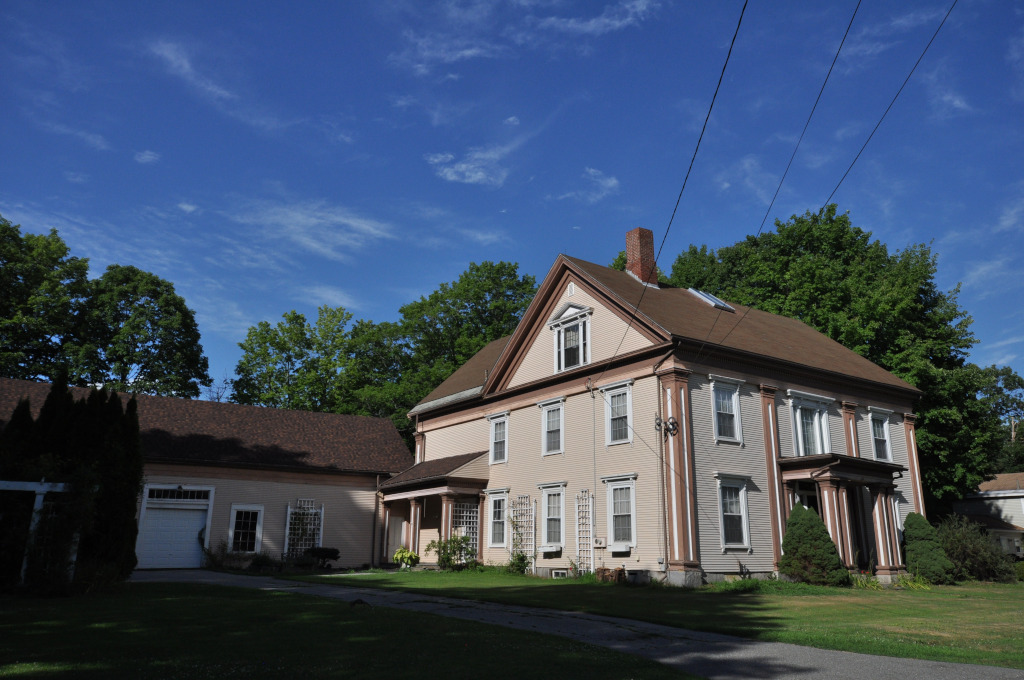

- Location within Maine Location within the United States
- Location: 22 Summit Street, Fairfield, Maine
- Coordinates: 44°35′14″N 69°36′3″W
- Area: 1 acre (0.40 ha)
- Built: 1856
- Architectural style: Greek Revival
- NRHP reference No.: 74000321
- Added to NRHP: January 18, 1974

The Connor-Bovie House is a historic house at 22 Summit Street in Fairfield, Maine. Built 1856–58, this house is a locally distinctive example of Greek Revival and Italianate styling. It is also significant as the home of William Connor, a prominent regional lumber baron, and as the home of his son Seldon, a general in the American Civil War and three-term Governor of Maine. The house was listed on the National Register of Historic Places in 1974.

== Description and history ==
The Connor-Bovie House is a 3-story wood-frame structure, three bays wide, with a side-gable roof, clapboard siding, and granite foundation. An ell extends to the rear, joined to a structure that probably served once as a carriage house. The bays of the south-facing main facade are delineated by paneled Doric pilasters, and the windows are framed by Italianate molding. The main entrance is sheltered by a portico, supported by paneled Doric columns, with a porch above. Both the main entrance and the doorway to the porch have flanking sidelight windows.

The house was built 1856–68 by William Connor, one of the proprietors of the main lumber mill in Fairfield, and a major area landowner. Connor's son Seldon (1839–1917), served as a brigadier general in the Union Army during the American Civil War, and was Governor of Maine 1876–78. The house was sold out of the family in 1939, to William T. Bovie, a surgeon who is credited with invention of the cauterizing "Bovie knife".

== See also ==
- National Register of Historic Places listings in Somerset County, Maine
