= Birch Island House =

Historic house in Maine, United States

- U.S. National Register of Historic Places
- Location within Maine Location within the United States
- Nearest city: Holeb, Maine
- Coordinates: 45°35′15″N 70°25′36″W
- Area: 2 acres (0.81 ha)
- Built: 1870
- Architectural style: Late Victorian
- NRHP reference No.: 96000246
- Added to NRHP: March 7, 1996

The Birch Island House is the centerpiece of a historic sporting camp on Birch Island, located in Holeb Pond in northwestern Somerset County, Maine, United States. Estimated to have been built around 1870, it is a rare surviving element of a 19th-century private camp in the state, when most surviving period camps were commercially run. The building was listed on the National Register of Historic Places in 1996. As of recent the porch has caved in and the structural integrity is questioned.

== Description and history ==
The Birch Island House is a 2 1/2-story wood-frame structure, with a rubble foundation and a red standing seam metal roof. A two-story porch extends across the front, and the roof in the rear slopes down to the first floor, giving the building a saltbox profile. The porch is supported by square posts with a decoratively sawn balustrade. The house is five bays wide, with doorways in the center bay (the lower one providing the main entrance, the upper one access to the upper balcony) and windows in the flanking bays. Each floor has four rooms, with living, dining, and kitchen space on the first floor and bedrooms on the second and in the half-story above. Original pine board finish has been covered over by plasterboard in many of these rooms.

The date of construction of the house is uncertain; mention of it does not appear in either local histories or in period works on Maine's sporting camps, and its remote location (access today is still not particularly easy) means it escaped wider notice. Tradition ascribes its construction date to 1870, although there is no documentary support for this. The island was documented to be home to the "Birch Island Sporting Camps", run by a private association, by the early decades of the 20th century, and this building appears to have functioned as a central lodge for the other facilities on the island. The camp was apparently abandoned around the 1950s, and was revived in the 1980s when it was acquired by R. David Murphy through the purchase of Birch Island Sporting Camps. R.D. Murphy, formed the Birch Island Sportsman Association, restored the sporting camps on the island and subdivided the island ownership. The Birch Island House ownership remains in trust with the Murphy family today.

== See also ==
- National Register of Historic Places listings in Somerset County, Maine
