= Samuel Holden House =

Historic house in Maine, United States

- U.S. National Register of Historic Places
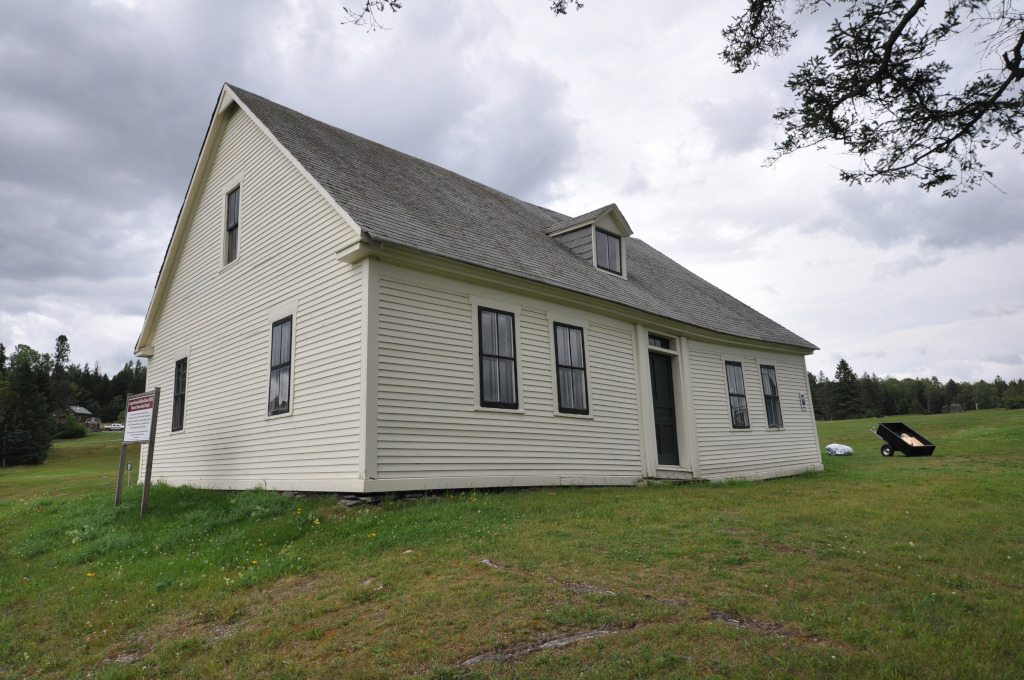

- Location within Maine Location within the United States
- Location: US 201 E side, Moose River Golf Club, Moose River, Maine
- Coordinates: 45°39′4″N 70°15′54″W
- Area: 1 acre (0.40 ha)
- Built: 1829
- Architectural style: Early Republic
- NRHP reference No.: 95001459
- Added to NRHP: December 14, 1995

The Samuel Holden House is a historic house, now located on the grounds of the Moose River Golf Club on United States Route 201 in Moose River, Maine. This 1 1/2-story Cape style house was built in 1829 by Samuel Holden (1772-1858), the first white settler of the region, and is the oldest known house standing on the "Canada Road", built around that time to join central Maine to Quebec. The house was listed on the National Register of Historic Places in 1995.

== Description and history ==
The Holden House stands on the east side of United States Route 201 in the rural center of the town of Moose River. It is set on the fringe of the Moose River Golf Club, a nine-hole golf course set on lands formerly belonging to the Holden family. The house is a 1 1/2-story wood frame Cape style house, set facing south on a stone foundation and clad in weatherboard siding. The main facade is five bays wide, with a center entrance framed by pilasters and topped by a transom window. A single small gable-roof dormer pierces the roof above the entrance. Southeast of the house stands a gable-roofed barn that appears to date to the late 19th century.

The house has undergone a significant number of alterations since its construction. In the early 20th century (and possibly earlier) it was used as a boarding house for travelers on the road, for which purposes ells were added to the east side of the house. Although these were present when the house was surveyed for listing on the National Register of Historic Places, they have since been removed. The house was listed by Maine Preservation as an endangered property in 1998, and in 2008 a preservation plan was developed. The house has since undergone a careful restoration to its early-19th-century appearance.

Built in 1829, the house was the third home built by Samuel Holden, a Massachusetts native who was the first white settler of the area, arriving in 1820 with a family of nine children. Tradition has it that Holden built his first log cabin in 1819, at a location north of this house, moving the family to the area the following year. His first cabin was destroyed by fire in 1820, and was rapidly replaced by another, built at this location. That cabin was replaced by the present frame house in 1829, and is fashioned from mill-sawn lumber. Holden's house was a major focal point of the community in its early years, serving as a site for school classes prior to the construction of the community's first schoolhouse, and as its first post office.

The house was owned by Holden descendants until 1872, and underwent a succession of owners until it was acquired by the town in 1993.

== See also ==
- National Register of Historic Places listings in Somerset County, Maine
