= Norridgewock Free Public Library =

- U.S. National Register of Historic Places
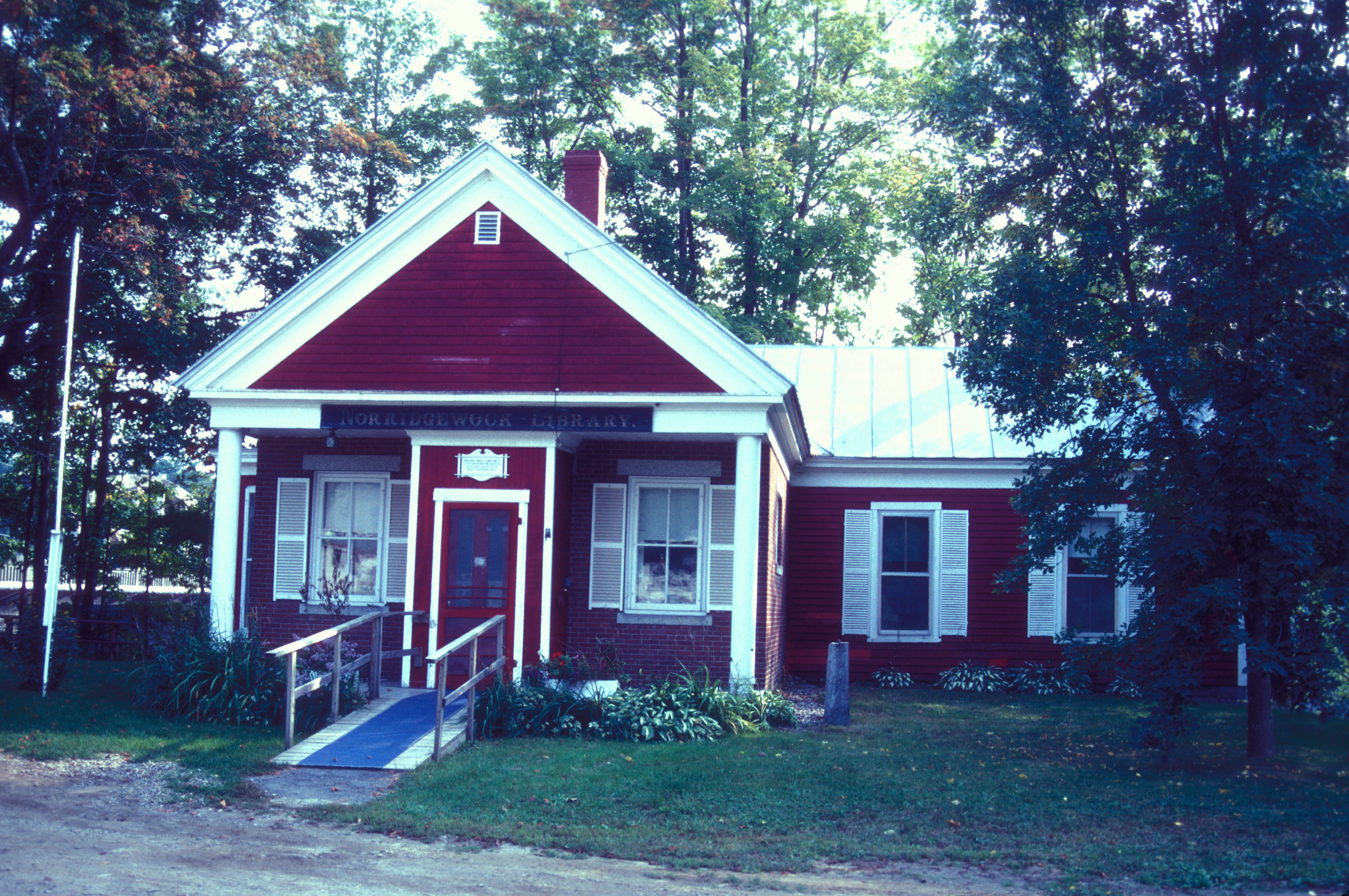

- Location within Maine Location within the United States
- Location: Sophie May Lane, Norridgewock, Maine
- Coordinates: 44°43′4″N 69°47′56″W
- Area: 0.3 acres (0.12 ha)
- Built: 1841
- Architect: Abbott, John S.
- Architectural style: Greek Revival
- NRHP reference No.: 82000780
- Added to NRHP: February 4, 1982

The Norridgewock Free Public Library is the principal public library of Norridgewock, Maine. It has two facilities: the main branch at 40 Mercer Road, and a smaller branch at the corner of Sophie May Lane and Madison Road. The latter building was the library's first building, and is an architecturally distinguished Greek Revival structure built in 1841. It was given to the town in 1903 by Rebecca Sophia Clarke, best known as a writer of children's literature under the pen name "Sophie May", and is listed on the National Register of Historic Places.

== Sophie May Branch architecture and history ==
The Sophie May Branch Library is set near the southwest corner of Sophie May Lane and Madison Road (Maine State Route 8/United States Route 201A), between Sophie May Lane and the Kennebec River. It is a single-story brick building, finished with wood and granite trim. Its north-facing main facade is three bays wide, and has a projecting gable end supported by Doric columns at the corners, with a center entry vestibule that is flush to the gable end. A wood-frame addition extends behind and to the west of the main block.

Built in 1841, this building is one of Norridgewock's better-preserved Greek Revival buildings. It was built by John S. Abbott, a prominent local lawyer who used it as his office. It was owned during the 19th century by a succession of lawyers, the last being Stephen Decatur Lindsey, who was married to the sister of Rebecca Sophia Clarke. Clarke, a Norridgewock native who lived nearby, inherited the building, and donated it to the town for use as a library in 1903. The library, now a municipal function, has its origins in a lending society established in 1810.

== See also ==
- National Register of Historic Places listings in Somerset County, Maine
