= Kromberg Barn =

- U.S. National Register of Historic Places
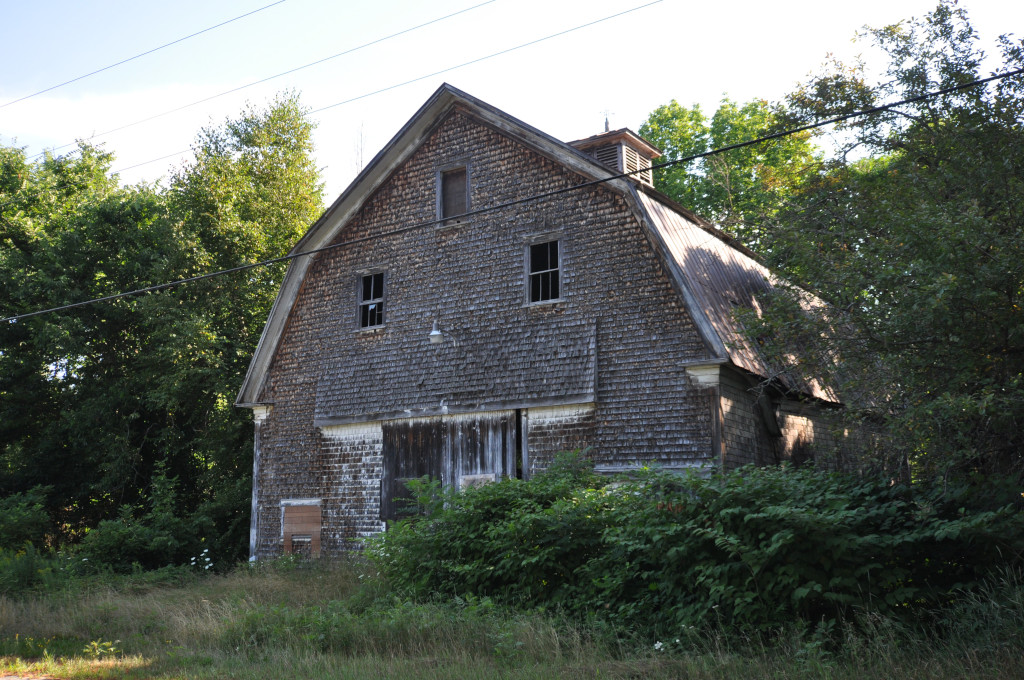

- Location within Maine Location within the United States
- Location: E. side of E. Pond Rd., across from number 462, Smithfield, Maine
- Coordinates: 44°37′11″N 69°46′12″W
- Area: less than one acre
- Built: 1820
- Architectural style: Late Victorian, gambrel roof barn
- NRHP reference No.: 08001357
- Added to NRHP: January 22, 2009

The Kromberg Barn is a historic barn on East Pond Road in Smithfield, Maine. With an estimated construction date of the 1810s, it is one of the oldest barns in the area, and is architecturally rare as an example of a gambrel-roof barn built using older framing methods associated with traditional English barns. The barn was listed on the National Register of Historic Places in 2009.

== Description and history ==
The barn is set on the east side of East Pond Road, on a large parcel of land opposite number 462, in the rural central interior Maine community of Smithfield. This land was probably first settled in 1810 by Benjamin Stevens. Stevens transferred the land, with his "homestead farm", to Oliver Stevens in 1853. Based on architectural evidence, it is likely that the barn was built early in Stevens' ownership of the property. After several ownership transfers, the land was owned for much of the first half of the 20th century by members of the Kromberg family.

The barn is set close to (within about 20 feet (6.1 m)) the roadway, and is oriented with its gambreled gable roof perpendicular to the road. It measures about 30.5 by 50.5 feet (9.3 m × 15.4 m), and is set on a foundation of piled fieldstones. Its walls are clad in wooden shingles, and most of its roof is corrugated metal; one steep side has wooden shingles. It is topped by a small louvered cupola with a metal roof, weathervane, and spire. The front facade has a main opening, which has a pair of vertical-board sliding doors, large enough to admit a laden wagon. There are small square windows on either side, and a pedestrian entrance at the far right. At the second level there are two sash windows, with a single sash at the third level near the gable peak.

The interior of the barn has three aisles, separating areas used for different functions. The main framing of the barn is hand-hewn timbers with posts that have a gunstock shape, and are connected to transverse beams via plates. This construction method, more normally found in older (or traditionally-built) English barns, is relatively rare in Maine's gambrel-roofed barns, most of which were built later in the 19th or early 20th centuries. This building's gambrel roof is a conventional frame construction that probably replaced the original gable roof in the 1920s during a major renovation that also relocated the posts of the center aisle.

== See also ==
- National Register of Historic Places listings in Somerset County, Maine
