= Caratunk Falls Archeological District =

Historic district in Maine, United States

- U.S. National Register of Historic Places
- U.S. Historic district
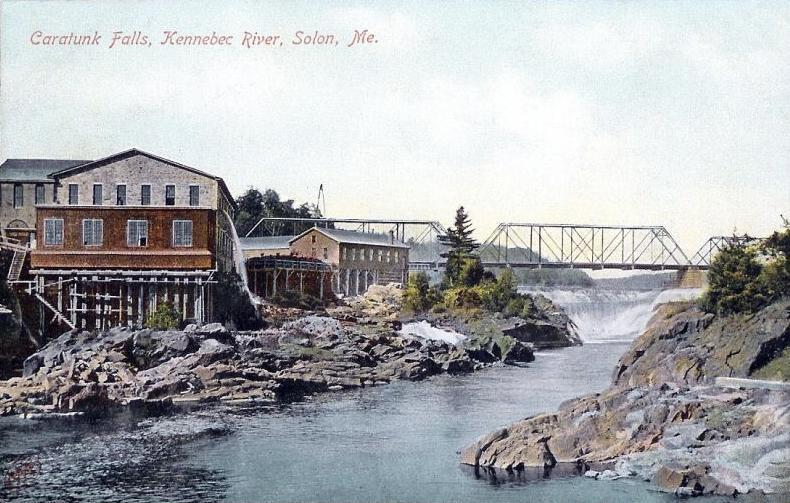
- Early 20th century postcard view of the industrial use of Caratunk Falls
- Nearest city: Solon, Maine
- Area: 16 acres (6.5 ha)
- Built: 1776
- NRHP reference No.: 86001200
- Added to NRHP: May 30, 1986

The Caratunk Falls Archeological District is a complex of prehistoric and historic archaeological sites in the Solon, Maine area. First identified in the 1960s as archaeologically significant, the site was mapped by state archaeologists in the early 1980s. At that time it was the single largest complex of archaeological significance in interior Maine, encompassing a period of human activity from the Archaic to the European contact period (and possibly later). The 16-acre (6.5 ha) area was listed on the National Register of Historic Places in 1986.

== Description ==
The district is located near Solon, along the banks of the Kennebec River in the general vicinity of Caratunk Falls (now the site of a dam which impounds the Kennebec River Reservoir). The area has a relatively thin layer of archaeological deposits in a forested environment and was estimated in the 1980s to cover 16 acres (6.5 ha), although its full extent was not established. Materials from the site were first collected by an amateur archaeologist in the 1960s, and the state sponsored extensive testing of the area in the mid-1980s. The site was immediately recognized as important, since more than twenty test pits returned significant materials, a first for interior Maine. Because of the relatively thin soils, there is relatively little vertical separation of finds that might be divergent in date of deposition. The presence of artifacts clearly linked to the Archaic period also highlighted the importance of the site, as these are extremely rare in interior Maine.

Finds at the site include a large amount of stone toolmaking debris (debitage) from the Middle Archaic to the contact period. Ceramic finds are mainly of a type not found in coastal Maine, impressed with "S-twist" cordage. Early European trade goods (dating to the 17th and 18th centuries) were also found. The most notable historic find is a boulder incised "B. A." and "1776". Although it is possible these marking are of more modern origin, their weathering suggests antiquity and authenticity. It is known that a Continental Army force led by Benedict Arnold passed this point on a 1775 expedition to attack Quebec City in the American Revolutionary War, and this marking may be a relic of that journey.

== See also ==
- National Register of Historic Places listings in Somerset County, Maine
