= Ingalls House (Mercer, Maine) =

Historic house in Maine, United States

- U.S. National Register of Historic Places
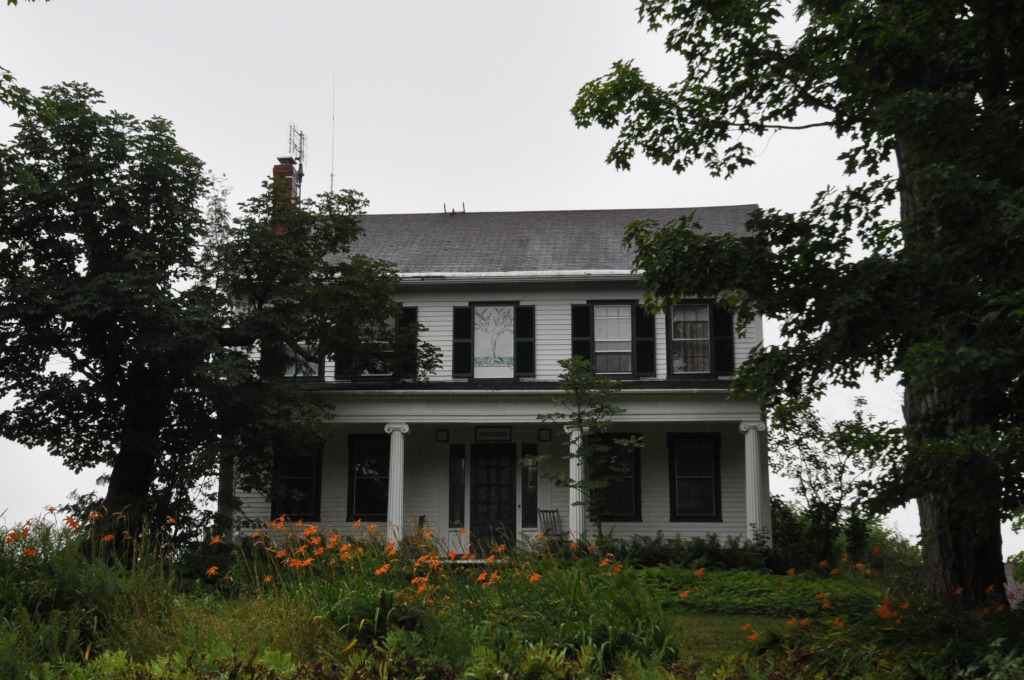

- Location within Maine Location within the United States
- Location: Main St., Mercer, Maine
- Coordinates: 44°40′39″N 69°56′18″W
- Area: 2 acres (0.81 ha)
- Built: 1835
- Architectural style: Greek Revival
- NRHP reference No.: 75000110
- Added to NRHP: June 5, 1975

The Ingalls House is a historic house on Main Street in Mercer, Maine. Built c. 1835–37, it is a particularly elaborate local example of Greek Revival architecture, made more distinctive by the relatively advanced use of stoves as a heating system at the time of its construction. The house was built by a son-in-law of American Revolutionary War General Henry Knox, and was owned for many years by Hannibal Ingalls, a prominent local businessman. It was listed on the National Register of Historic Places in 1975.

== Description and history ==
The Ingalls House is set on the south side of Main Street, between its junction with Rome Road and Bog Stream and a short way west of the cluster of buildings that mark the center of the village. It is a 2 1/2-story wood-frame structure, with a side gable roof clapboard siding, and a granite foundation. It originally had two chimneys, one at either end, but the one on the right has been taken down. The north-facing front facade has a typical 18th-century symmetrical five-bay facade with a center entrance. The entry is flanked by sidelight windows and framed by simple Greek Revival trim. A single-story shed-roof porch extends across the front, supported by fluted Doric columns. Its entablature extends around the sides of the porch, giving them a partially pedimented appearance. The main roof's side gables are also fully pedimented, with a narrow entablature extending around the building, and simple pilasters at the corners.

The interior of the house follows a typical central-hall plan, and has restrained Greek Revival woodwork. Its most unusual feature is the heating system, which was, by the architectural evidence, originally designed for heating provided by stoves rather than open fires. This would have been a technologically advanced choice for central Maine, where many houses were still built with full fireplaces. None of the original stoves was retained when the house heating was modernized in the 20th century.

The house was built in 1835-37 by Ebenezer Thatcher, whose wife Julia was the daughter of American Revolutionary War General and Maine land magnate Henry Knox. Later in the 19th century it was owned by Hannibal Ingalls, a prominent local businessman.

== See also ==
- National Register of Historic Places listings in Somerset County, Maine
