= South Solon Meetinghouse =

- U.S. National Register of Historic Places
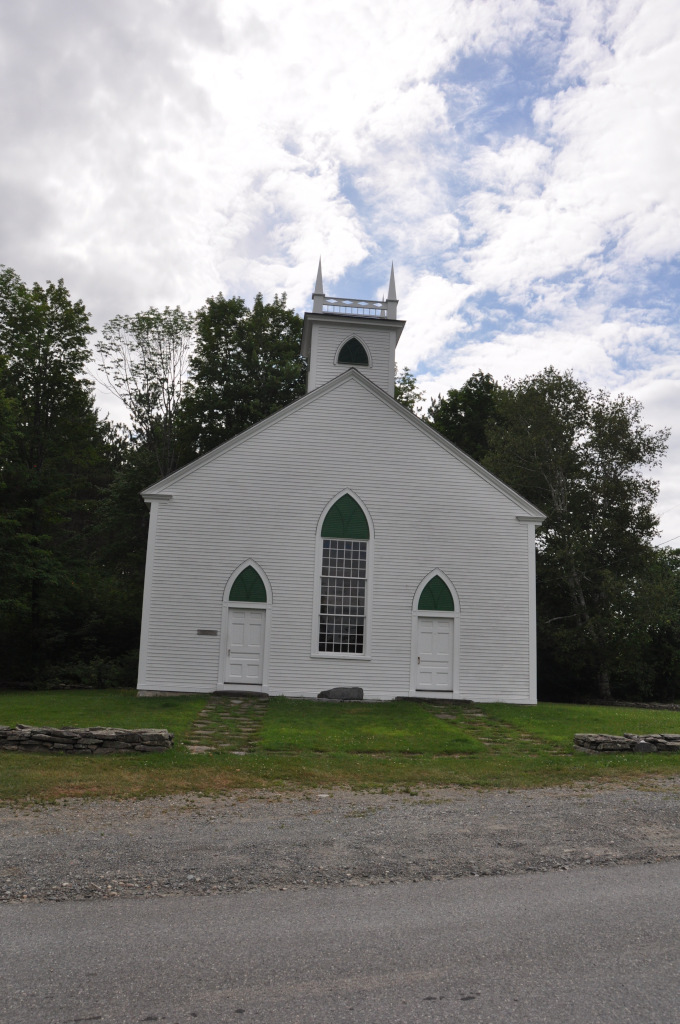

- Location within Maine Location within the United States
- Location: Solon, Maine
- Coordinates: 44°54′47″N 69°46′44″W
- Area: 0.5 acres (0.20 ha)
- Built: 1842
- Architect: Doe, John
- Architectural style: Gothic Revival
- NRHP reference No.: 80000255
- Added to NRHP: June 16, 1980

South Solon Meetinghouse is a historic church building in south central Solon, Maine. Built in 1842, it is a remarkably fine example of Gothic Revival architecture in a rural setting. It was listed on the National Register of Historic Places in 1980. The building is now owned by a non-profit organization and operated as a community function space.

== Description and history ==
The South Solon Meetinghouse is located at the fourway junction of Rices Corner (or South Solon) Road, Parkman Hill Road, and Meetinghouse Road, about 5 miles (8.0 km) southeast of the village center of Solon. It is a single-story wood frame structure, with a gable roof and clapboard siding. A squat single-stage square tower rises above the main (east-facing) facade, consisting of a belfry with Gothic-arched louvered openings, and pinnacles at the corners above. The main facade is symmetrically arranged, with a pair of entrance flanking a tall central window, all three elements topped by Gothic-arched panels. The sides of the building each have three similar windows.

The original box pews, pulpit and choir loft gallery are still in place. The interior of the South Solon Meeting House was elaborately painted between 1952 and 1957 by 13 artists from the nearby Skowhegan School of Painting and Sculpture. The artwork inside this building features a painting technique called buon fresco which has been taught at the Skowhegan School since its foundation. Some of the artists involved in this fresco project are William King, Ashley Bryan, Sidney Hurwitz, John Wallace, Sigmund Abeles, Tom Mikkelson, and Edwin Brooks.

== See also ==
- National Register of Historic Places listings in Somerset County, Maine
