= Spaulding House =

Historic house in Maine, United States

- U.S. National Register of Historic Places
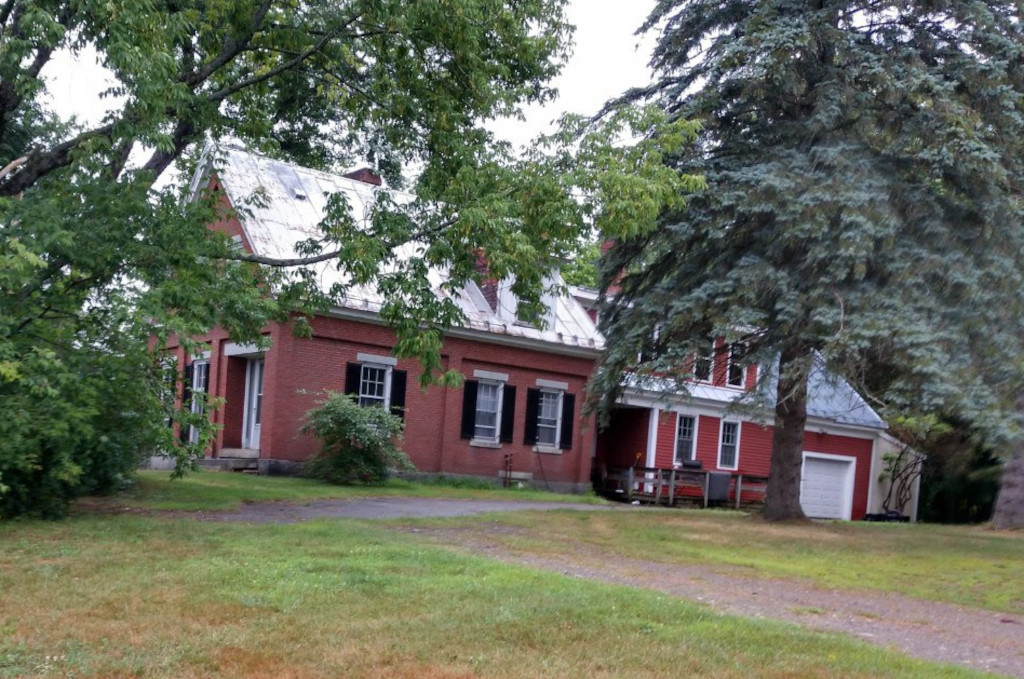

- Location within Maine Location within the United States
- Location: Main St., Norridgewock, Maine
- Coordinates: 44°42′51″N 69°47′45″W
- Area: 1 acre (0.40 ha)
- Built: 1835
- Architect: Otis Spaulding
- Architectural style: Greek Revival
- NRHP reference No.: 78000201
- Added to NRHP: December 18, 1978

The Spaulding House is a historic house on Main Street in Norridgewock, Maine. Built about 1835 by one of the town's early settlers, it is a fine local example of Greek Revival executed in brick. The house was listed on the National Register of Historic Places in 1978.

== Description and history ==
The Spaulding House is set on the north side of Main Street, near Norridgewock's town center. It is a 1 1/2-story brick building, with a front-facing gable roof and a rear wood-frame ell, all set on a granite foundation. The south-facing front facade is three bays wide, with the entrance recessed in the right bay. Windows on the first floor are triple-hung sashes, with granite sills and lintels; there are also two windows at the attic level. On the sides of the house the windows are set in slightly recessed panels, a feature more typically found on industrial construction. A shed-roof dormer is set on the east side of the roof. The ell includes two normal doors and a 20th-century garage door.

Otis Spaulding, one of Norridgewock's early white settlers, came to the area in 1815, and probably built what is now the ell of this house around that time. The main house dates to about 1835, and was held by Spaulding's descendants until 1921.

== See also ==
- National Register of Historic Places listings in Somerset County, Maine
