= Gov. Abner Coburn House =

Historic house in Maine, United States

- U.S. National Register of Historic Places
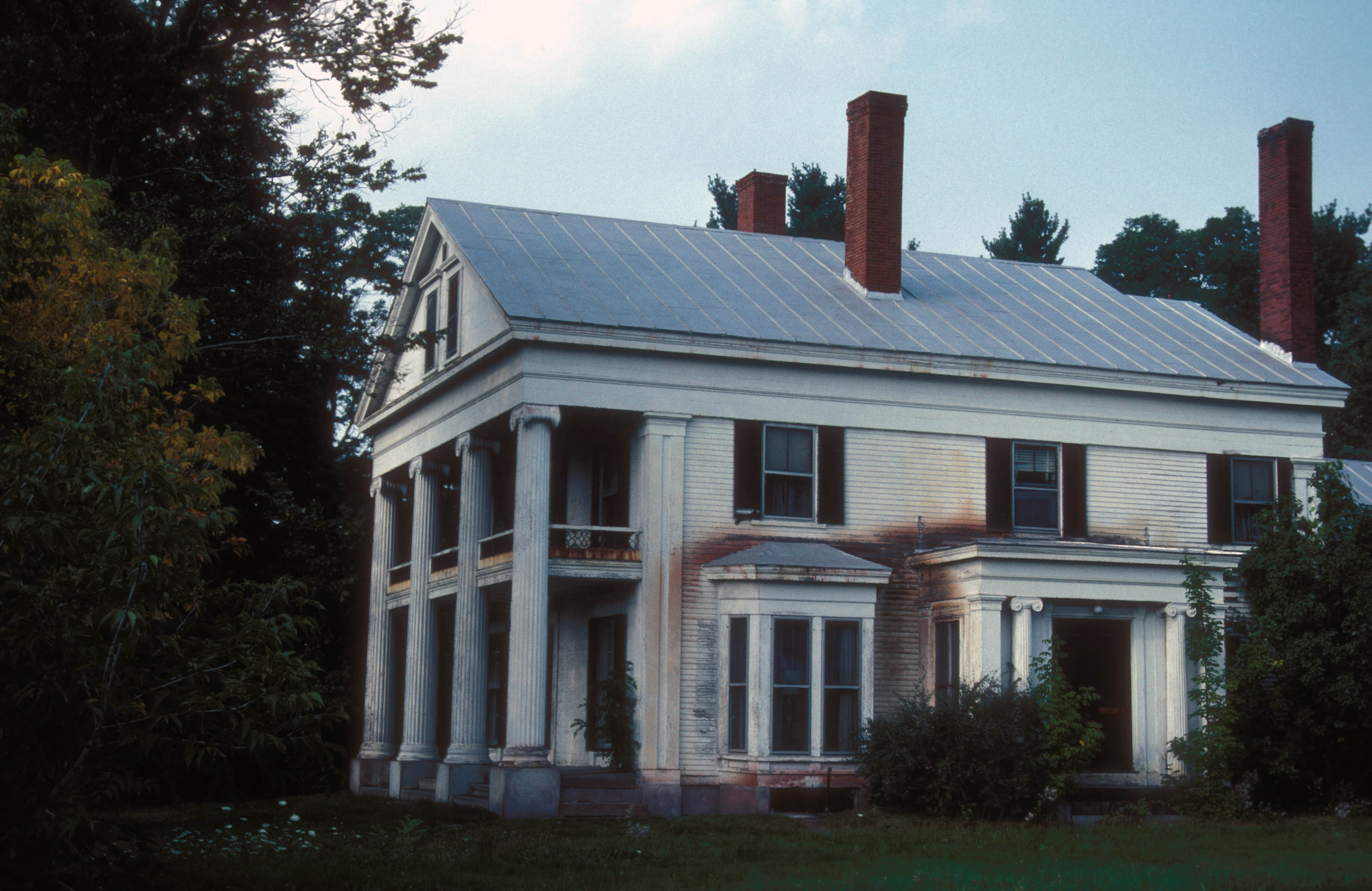

- Location within Maine Location within the United States
- Location: Main St., Skowhegan, Maine
- Coordinates: 44°45′43″N 69°43′0″W
- Area: 1 acre (0.40 ha)
- Built: 1849
- Architect: Joseph Bigelow
- Architectural style: Greek Revival
- NRHP reference No.: 74000193
- Added to NRHP: July 30, 1974

The Gov. Abner Coburn House is a historic house on Main Street in Skowhegan, Maine. Built in 1849 by a local master builder, it is one of the town's finest examples of Greek Revival architecture. It was built for Skowhegan native Abner Coburn, one of its wealthiest citizens, who served one term as Governor of Maine. The house was listed on the National Register of Historic Places in 1974.

== Description and history ==
The Coburn House is a rectangular 2 1/2-story wood-frame structure with a front gable roof. Its front facade is dominated by a two-story Greek temple front, with four fluted Ionic columns supporting an entablature and gabled pediment. The pediment interior has two symmetrically placed sash windows. The wall behind the temple front is flushboarded, with three bays of windows on each level, and a porch at the second level with a low balustrade. The main entrance to the house is on the right, in a projecting single-story rectangular block that includes flanking Ionic columns and pilasters on either side of the recessed doorway. The building corners have paneled pilasters, which support a plain entablature that encircles the house below the roofline. The house has deferred maintenance, but appears to have some work being done to it as of June 2025. Peeling paint (or no paint) is evident with plywood in some of the windows. The house is downhill from the Bloomfield Academy Building, which is also on the register.

The house was built in 1849 for Abner and Philander Coburn, unmarried brothers who were among the state's wealthiest citizens, controlling at one time more than 700 square miles (1,800 km^{2}) of timberland in the state. Abner Coburn was reported in 1882 to have a net worth of $6–7 million. He was involved in large-scale business endeavors, including the Maine Central Railroad, and sat on the boards of Colby College and the University of Maine. He served one term as Governor of Maine in 1863.

The builder of the Coburn House was Joseph Bigelow, a Skowhegan-based master builder with a statewide reputation. Other notable buildings he worked in include the Samuel Farrar House in Bangor, and Skowhegan's 1844 brick First Baptist Church. Bigelow hand-carved the columns and capitals found on this house.

== See also ==
- National Register of Historic Places listings in Somerset County, Maine
