= The Evergreens =

- U.S. National Register of Historic Places
- Location: Ferry Road, Solon, Maine
- Area: 7.5 acres (3.0 ha)
- NRHP reference No.: 82000779
- Added to NRHP: February 8, 1982

The Evergreens is a campground on Ferry Street (Route 201A) in Solon, Maine, on the banks of the Kennebec River. The property has a documented archaeological history, with evidence of human habitation dating back thousands of years. It is also known that the military expedition of Benedict Arnold camped in this area in 1775 while en route to Quebec City in the American Revolutionary War. The property has had formal excavations by the Maine State Museum, and was listed on the National Register of Historic Places in 1982.

The campground offers both full-service and limited-service (tent camping) sites, as well as a small number of cabins. Amenities include a boat ramp, a small camp shop, and bathroom facilities with hot showers.

== Archaeological site ==
The Evergreens has been the subject of several archaeological investigations, the first formal one in 1969. The extent of the archaeologically sensitive area extends along the river for 540 yards (490 m), and inland for 70 yards (64 m). Features found during excavations include stone hearths and fire-reddened soil, as well as stone tools and artifacts related to their manufacture, as well as pottery fragments. The stone fragments are of particular note, as many of them originate in sources outside the state, mainly from the drainage of the Saint Lawrence River. Although firm dates have not been made for the materials found at the site, they range widely in style, from the Brewerton/Laurentian tradition of 5,000 years ago, to the Susquehanna tradition of 3,000 years ago, up to finds consistent with those dated to 1000 CE from other sites in the state. The site was listed on the National Register of Historic Places as a rare site at which this combination and quality of materials has been found.

== See also ==
- National Register of Historic Places listings in Somerset County, Maine
