= Bingham Free Meetinghouse =

Historic church in Maine, United States

- U.S. National Register of Historic Places
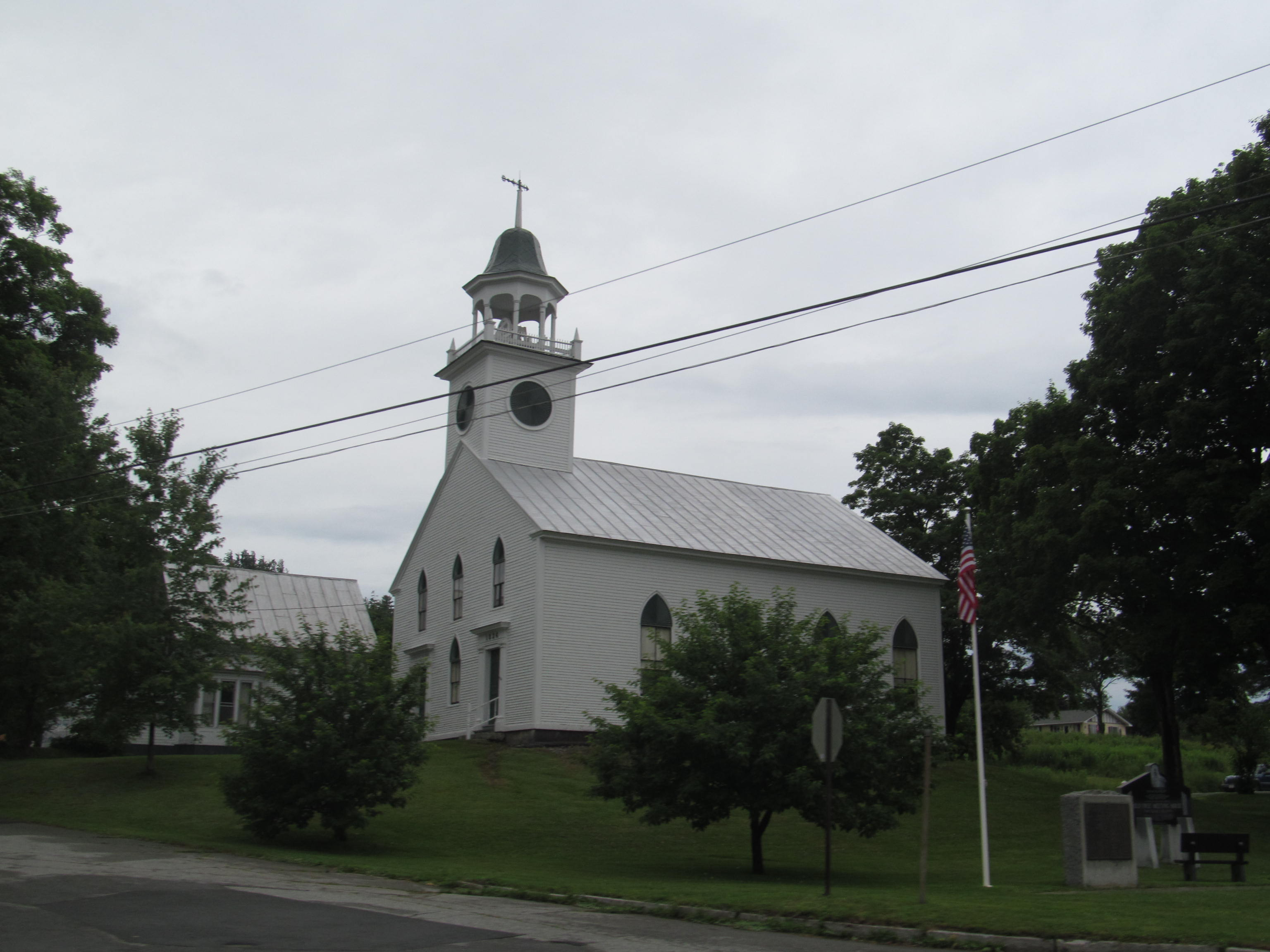

- Location within Maine Location within the United States
- Location: S. Main St. (U.S. 201), Bingham, Maine
- Coordinates: 45°3′8″N 69°52′58″W
- Area: 1 acre (0.40 ha)
- Built: 1835
- Architectural style: Gothic Revival, Federal
- NRHP reference No.: 76000113
- Added to NRHP: June 03, 1976

The Bingham Free Meetinghouse is a historic church on South Main Street (U.S. 201) in Bingham, Maine. Built in 1835–36, this wood-frame structure was the first church to be built north of Caratunk Falls in northwestern Maine. The building is architecturally transitional, exhibiting both Federal and Gothic Revival elements. It was listed on the National Register of Historic Places in 1976.

== Description and history ==
The church is a single story wood-frame structure, finished in clapboards and resting on a granite foundation. Its main facade is divided into three bays, with the outer bays housing matching entrances, each flanked by pilasters and topped by an architrave with projecting cornice moulding. The central bay has a Gothic-style lancet window, as do all three bays at the balcony level. The sides of the church have four tall Gothic windows. A tower rises above the main facade, whose first stage is a square, with a sunburst louver pattern on three sides. This section is topped by a low balustrade with Gothic pinnacles at the corners. The next state is an open belfry, with eight columns rising to support a bell-shaped steeple, with spire and weathervane.

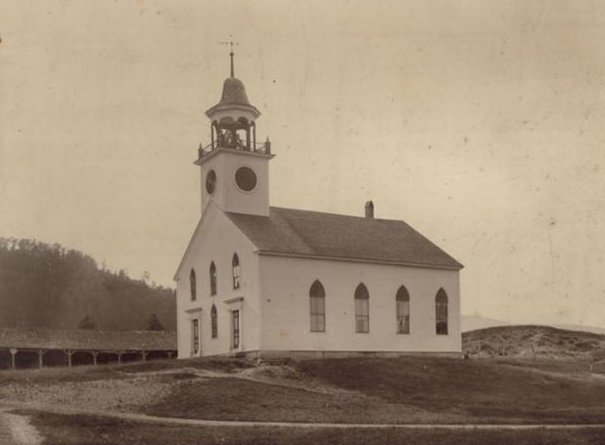
Photograph c. 1890

The interior has relatively modest Federal styling, most of which it has retained. The original pulpit and box pews remain, although the doors of the latter have been removed. The balcony level was removed during remodelling in 1902.

Major settlement of the town of Bingham began in the early 19th century, with early church congregations meeting in the local schoolhouse. In 1835 the local denominations agreed to share the cost of constructing this building, which was completed in 1836. Services were originally arranged based on pew ownership, but eventually the dominant Congregationalists took the building over completely. Attendance declined with the construction of a new church around the turn of the 20th century. This building was rescued from demolition by a chapter of the Daughters of the American Revolution (DAR), which later transferred title of the building to the town.

== See also ==
- National Register of Historic Places listings in Somerset County, Maine
