= Cotton-Smith House =

Historic house in Maine, United States

- U.S. National Register of Historic Places
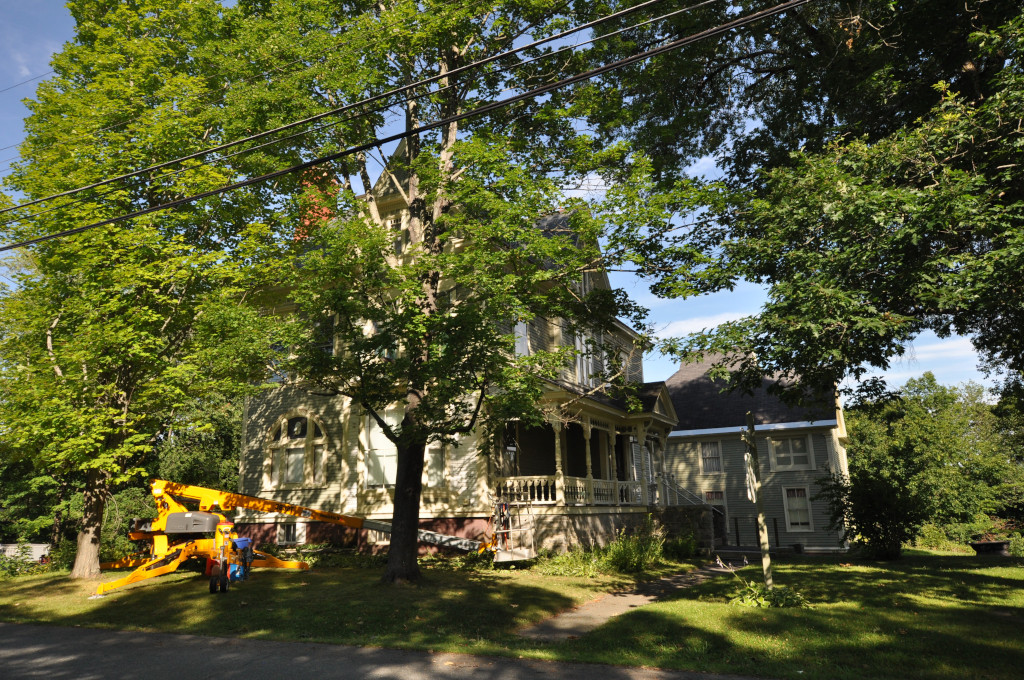

- Location within Maine Location within the United States
- Location: 42 High St., Fairfield, Maine
- Coordinates: 44°35′11″N 69°36′2″W
- Area: less than one acre
- Built: 1890
- Architectural style: Queen Anne
- NRHP reference No.: 92000794
- Added to NRHP: June 18, 1992

The Cotton-Smith House is a historic house at 42 High Street in Fairfield, Maine. Built in 1890, it is one of Fairfield's finest Queen Anne Victorian houses. It was built by Joseph Cotton, owner of the Maine Manufacturing Company, which produced iceboxes, and occupied by him for just four years. The house was acquired in 1983 by the Fairfield Historical Society, which operates it as the Fairfield History House, a museum of local history. The house was listed on the National Register of Historic Places in 1992.

== Description and history ==
The Cotton-Smith House is a 2 1/2-story wood-frame structure, set on a granite and brick foundation on a sloping lot in a residential area near Fairfield's town center. It has a truncated hip roof with slate shingles, and several large gable projections. The front (west-facing) facade has two sections: the left side has a round-arch three-part window with a pair of sash windows above, and the right, which projects slight, rises to a full-height gable, has a polygonal window bay topped by a hip roof with a small gable, a pair of sash windows above, and smaller windows in the gable. The gable is decorated with wooden panels that have intricate sawn details. The south elevation, where the main entrance is located, has a projecting section near its center, with a single-story porch running forward from that projection, supported by turned posts and balustrade. Behind the house stands a matching carriage house, which is gambrel-roofed and rests on a brick foundation. It has the same basic design features as the house.

The house's interior follows a side hall plan, with the hall on the building's south side. To the northwest is a passage decorated with turned wood columns leading to the dining room and sitting room, with the parlor in the southwestern corner. A small study is located in the southeast, with the kitchen and pantry area to the northeast. The sitting room and parlor are decorated with distinctive stencilwork, dating to the early 20th century, in the cornices.

The house was built in 1890 by Joseph Cotton, although it was apparently not quite complete when he sold it in 1894. Cotton was locally notable as the owner of the Maine Manufacturing Company, a manufacturer of iceboxes. Cotton moved from Fairfield to Nashua, New Hampshire, selling the house to John Smith, a local carpenter. The house remained in the Smith family until 1983, when his daughter-in-law sold it to the Fairfield Historical Society. The society uses the property as a museum and for meetings and events.

== See also ==
- National Register of Historic Places listings in Somerset County, Maine
