= Weston Homestead =

Historic house in Maine, United States

- U.S. National Register of Historic Places
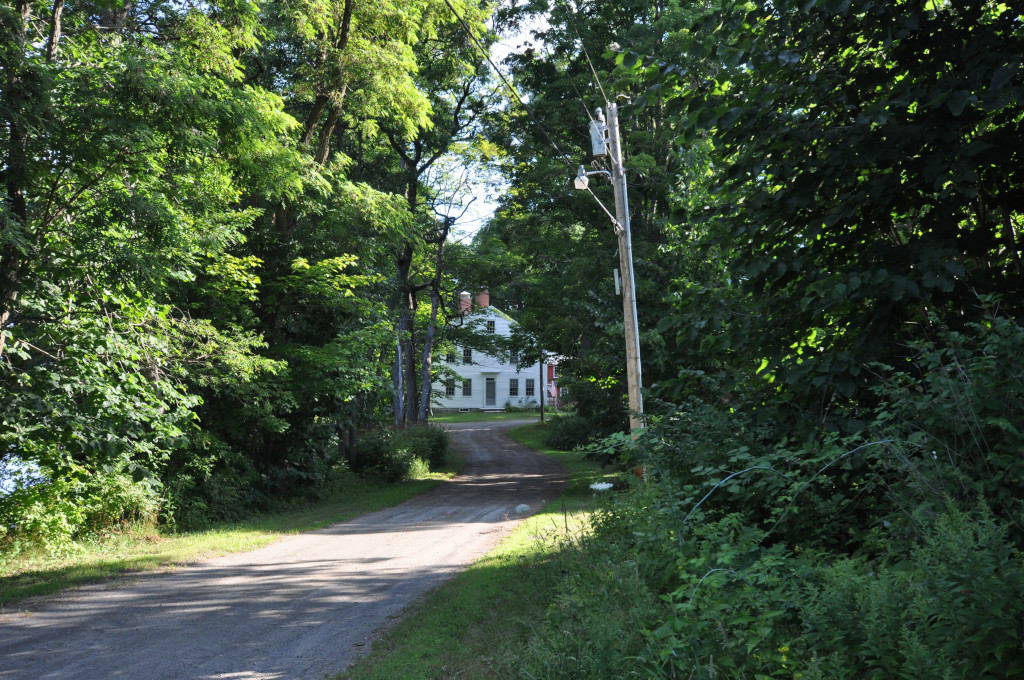

- Location within Maine Location within the United States
- Location: Northern end of Weston Road, Madison, Maine
- Coordinates: 44°49′13″N 69°52′13″W
- Area: 2 acres (0.81 ha)
- Built: 1817
- Architect: Spaulding, Ephraim
- Architectural style: Federal
- NRHP reference No.: 77000086
- Added to NRHP: November 23, 1977

The Weston Homestead is a historic house on Weston Avenue in Madison, Maine, United States. Built in 1817, it is remarkably fine and well-preserved example of Federal period architecture. The many generations of Westons who have owned have a history of civic involvement in the community. The house was listed on the National Register of Historic Places in 1977.

== Description and history ==
The Weston Homestead is set on the east bank of the Kennebec River, on a rural parcel at the end of Weston Road, north of the town center of Madison. It is a large 2 1/2-story wood-frame structure, with a gabled tin roof, clapboard siding, and a granite foundation. Its main facade faces west, toward the river, and is symmetrically arrange, with five bays. The central one is occupied by the main entrance, which is flanked by Doric pilasters and is topped by a fanlight and a lintel with dentil moulding. A long two-story ell extends to the rear (east) of the house, connecting it to a carriage barn. The interior of the house has very few alterations, retaining wallpaper from the 1830s in the main parlor and from 1817 in the front hall.

The house was built by Benjamin Weston, whose father Joseph Weston settled in Skowhegan in 1771, and whose mother, Eunice Farnsworth Weston, was the first documented female settler in Somerset County. Weston operated a ferry service on the river. Benjamin's son Nathan was prominent in local civic and economic affairs, promoting construction of the first railroad bridge in Madison and helping fund construction of the community's first church. As of the date of the property's listing on the National Register of Historic Places in 1977, the property remained in the hands of Weston descendants.

== See also ==
- National Register of Historic Places listings in Somerset County, Maine
