= History House (Skowhegan, Maine) =

Historic house in Maine, United States

- Skowhegan History House
- U.S. National Register of Historic Places
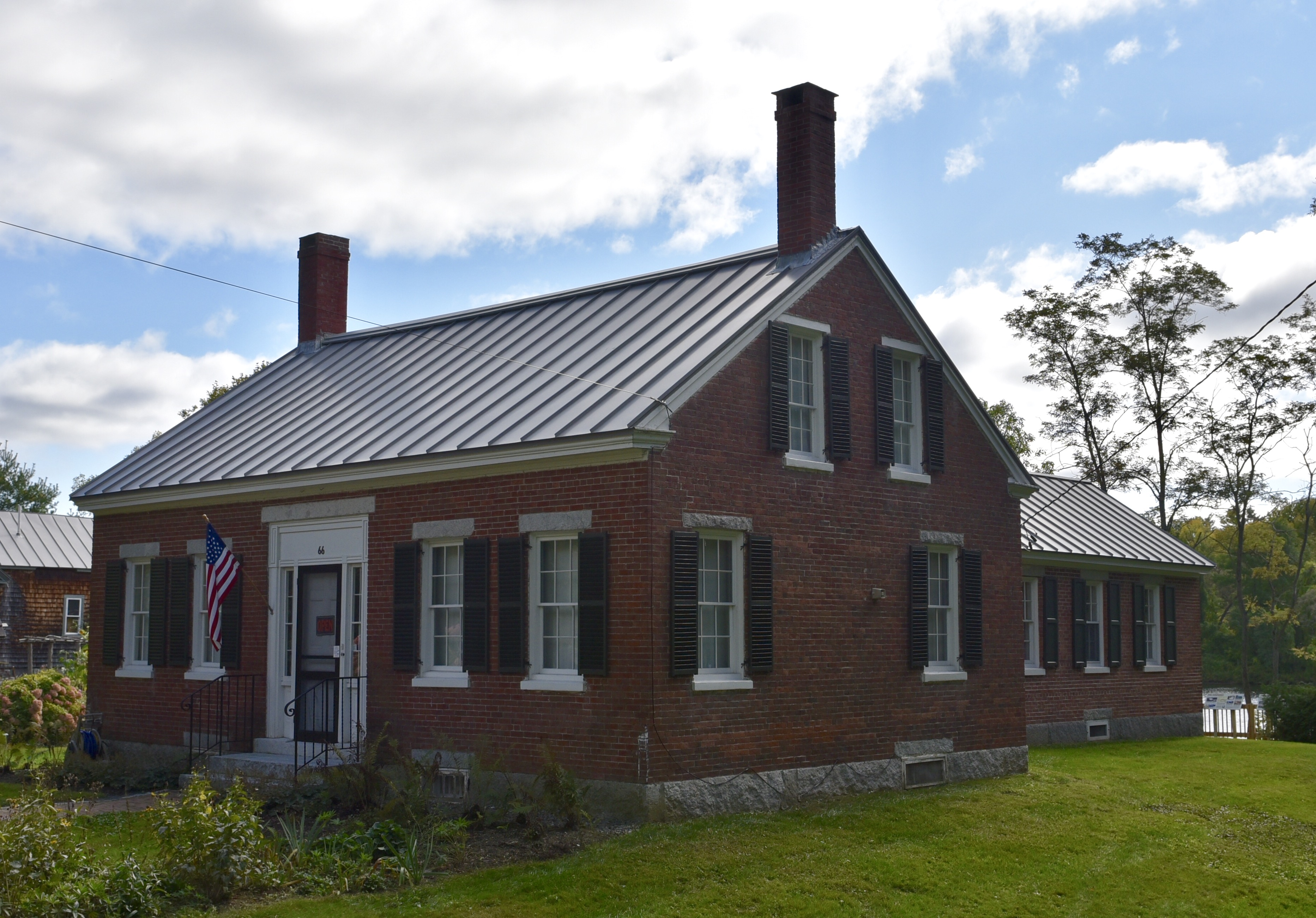

- Location within Maine Location within the United States
- Location: 40 Elm St. Skowhegan, Maine
- Coordinates: 44°45′56″N 69°43′32″W
- Area: 0.3 acres (0.12 ha)
- Built: 1839
- Architect: Samuel Philbrick
- Architectural style: Greek Revival
- NRHP reference No.: 83003677
- Added to NRHP: December 29, 1983

The Skowhegan History House is a historic house and museum at 66 Elm Street in Skowhegan, Maine. Built in 1839, this two-story brick house is one of the few of that period to survive Skowhegan's industrialization later in the 19th century. The house has served as a local history museum since 1937. It was listed on the National Register of Historic Places in 1983.

== Description and history ==
The History House is set on the south side of Elm Street, between it and the Kennebec River, at the junction of Elm with Norridgewock Avenue and Pleasant Street. It is a two-story brick structure, five bays wide, with a side-gable roof and two end chimneys. The brick is laid in a modified English bond, with seven rows of stretchers followed by a course of headers. Its Greek Revival styling includes a simple cornice and returns at the gable ends, sidelight windows and pilasters flanking the main entrance, and granite sills and lintels. A fireproof museum wing was added to the rear of the house in 1935.

The house was built in c. 1839 by Samuel Philbrick, a potter, later a clerk for Skowhegan Savings Bank, and was a fairly typical small worker's house of the period. Most similar buildings in Skowhegan were lost due to the city's industrialization over the remainder of the 19th century. The first permanent home owner was Arron Spear, a blacksmith, who later sold the house to James H.K. Lord. The house was acquired by Louise Helen Coburn, a local historian, who in 1937, opened its doors as a museum. The rear addition, added at that time, was executed with sympathetic techniques and styling.

The museum is open Tuesday-Friday between June and September, or by appointment. Its collections are focused on local history, and include unique documents and artifacts.

== See also ==
- National Register of Historic Places listings in Somerset County, Maine
