= Hodgdon Site =

- U.S. National Register of Historic Places
- Nearest city: Embden, Maine
- Area: 1 acre (0.40 ha)
- NRHP reference No.: 80000253
- Added to NRHP: April 23, 1980

The Hodgdon Site, designated the Maine Archeological Survey Site 69.4, is a prehistoric rock art site near Embden, Maine. The site is located on a ledge overlooking the Kennebec River, in territory that was under the control of the Norridgewock tribe around the time of European contact, and is several miles downriver from the historic Norridgewock village. The markings are estimated to date to the Late Ceramic Period (c. 900-1200 CE) and include anthropomorphic representations of human figures, as well as an unusual representation of a post-and-beam structure topped by parallel semicircular arcs. This latter figure is thought to represent the house of Father Sébastien Rale, a French Jesuit priest who built a house at Norridgewock in 1722.

The site was first documented in 1775 by members of the military expedition to Quebec led by Benedict Arnold. In 1894 it was photographed by local resident E. W. Moore. The ledge on which the rock art is located was later partially destroyed when it was dynamited to facilitate logging drives on the river; this photographic evidence suggests that this act did not destroy any of the artwork. The site was again documented in the 1960s by a University of Maine archaeologist, who recognized the shamanistic significance of its figures, and their relationship to more distant rock art.

The site was listed on the National Register of Historic Places in 1980.

== See also ==
- National Register of Historic Places listings in Somerset County, Maine
