= Dudley's Corner School House =

- U.S. National Register of Historic Places
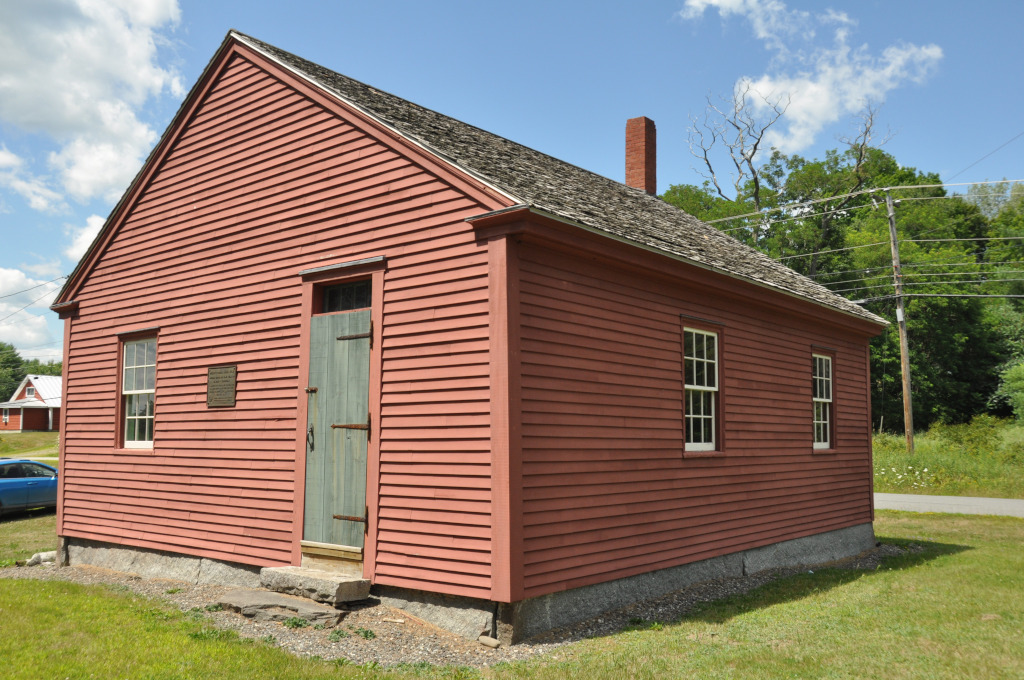

- Location within Maine Location within the United States
- Location: 5 Dudley Corner Rd., Skowhegan, Maine
- Coordinates: 44°46′20″N 69°40′34″W
- Area: less than one acre
- Built: 1835
- Architectural style: Greek Revival
- NRHP reference No.: 02000787
- Added to NRHP: July 15, 2002

The Dudley's Corner School House is a historic former school and civic building at the junction of Rosies Court (formerly Parkman Road) and Dudley Corner Roads in Skowhegan, Maine. With a possible construction date as early as 1804, was Skowhegan's first site for town meetings and elections, also seeing use as a school and church. It was used primarily as a school between 1849 and 1921, and has been used since then by community groups. The modest Greek Revival building is the least-altered of Skowhegan's surviving 19th-century district schools, and was listed on the National Register of Historic Places in 2002.

== Description and history ==
The Dudley's Corner School is set on a grassy triangle of land bounded by Rosies Court (formerly part of Parkman Road prior to a bridge closure), Dudley Corner Road, and United States Route 2, about 3 miles (4.8 km) east of the Skowhegan village center. It is a single-story wood frame structure, with a front-facing gable roof, clapboard siding, and a granite slab foundation. A single brick chimney rises from the north end of the building. The main entrance is off-center on the south side, with a transom window overhead that has elliptical muntins. There are two sash windows on each of the other three sides of the building. The doorway leads into a small vestibule area, which then opens into a single large chamber. Three walls have vertical wainscoting with plaster on lath above, while the fourth wall is completely finished in tapered wooden boards. The ceiling is plastered. The room shows evidence of repeated alteration.

The first school building at this site was constructed in 1804. It is unclear whether the present building is a replacement or a rehabilitation of that first building, since records pertaining work performed in 1835 are unclear. According to a local history, the Dudley's Corner School was the site at which most town meetings and elections were held between 1828 and 1848, and also housed meetings of the First Christian Church before it moved into the village. Between 1849 and 1921, the building served the community as a school. It was used as a function space in the 1930s and 1940s by the local chapter of the Daughters of the American Revolution, and more recently by local Boy Scout organizations. It continues to be owned by the town.

== See also ==
- National Register of Historic Places listings in Somerset County, Maine
