= Samuel Weston Homestead =

Historic house in Maine, United States

- U.S. National Register of Historic Places
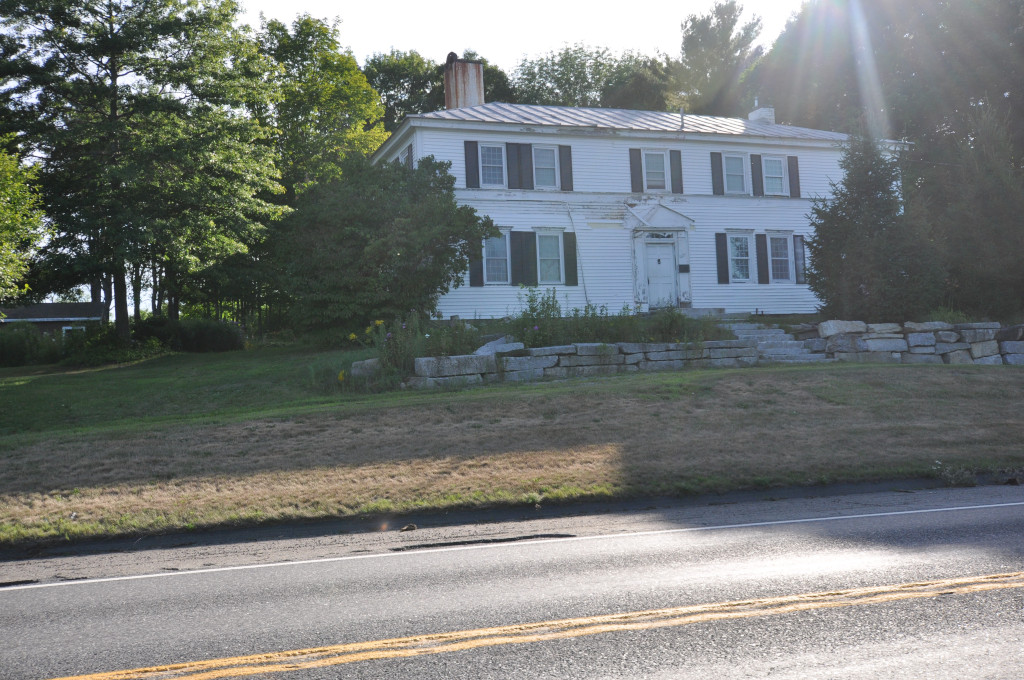

- Location within Maine Location within the United States
- Location: US 201 Skowhegan, Maine
- Coordinates: 44°44′50″N 69°39′55″W
- Area: 1 acre (0.40 ha)
- Built: 1798
- Architectural style: Georgian, Federal
- NRHP reference No.: 80000256
- Added to NRHP: November 10, 1980

The Samuel Weston Homestead is a historic house on United States Route 201 in Skowhegan, Maine. Built 1798–1800, it is a high-quality example of transitional Georgian-Federal period architecture, and is notable for its historical association with Samuel Weston, an early resident and land surveyor of the region. The house was listed on the National Register of Historic Places in 1980.

== Description and history ==
The Weston Homestead is set on the southwest side of a rural stretch of US 201, southeast of Skowhegan center. It is a 2 1/2-story wood-frame structure with an L shape, presenting facades to the northeast and southeast. The northeast-facing facade is the primary, six bays wide, with the main entrance in the third bay from the left, sheltered by a portico with Doric columns, and a minor secondary entrance sandwiched to the left of the rightmost window. The fenestration is irregularly arranged. The secondary facade is five bays wide, with a centered entrance flanked by pilasters and topped by a gabled pediment. The house's interior is a well-preserved blend of Georgian and Federal period styling.

The house was built between 1798 and 1800 by Samuel Weston, whose father Joseph settled Canaan (as Skowhegan was first called) in 1772. The younger Weston was a leading citizen of the area in his time, serving as a justice of the peace and as the town's first postmaster. His most important work was as a surveyor: he was hired by William Bingham and the state of Massachusetts (of which Maine was then a part) to survey more than 1,000,000 acres (4,000 km^{2}) of land in the region, part of what is locally known as the Bingham Purchase.

== See also ==
- National Register of Historic Places listings in Somerset County, Maine
