= Somerset Academy (Athens, Maine) =

- U.S. National Register of Historic Places
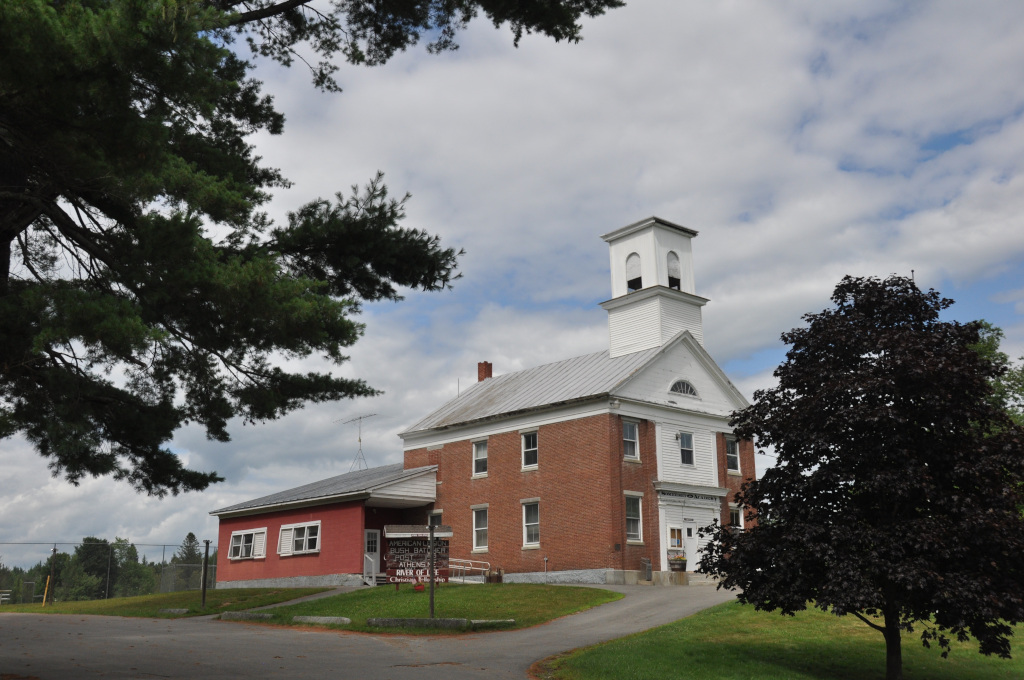

- Location within Maine Location within the United States
- Location: Academy St., Athens, Maine
- Coordinates: 44°55′37″N 69°40′18″W
- Built: 1846
- Architect: Bigelow, Joseph
- Architectural style: Greek Revival
- NRHP reference No.: 84001499
- Added to NRHP: July 19, 1984

Somerset Academy, also known as Athens Academy, is an historic building on Academy Street in Athens, Maine. Built in 1846, it is a remarkably sophisticated treatment of Greek Revival architecture in rural setting. The building is home to the River of Life Church. It was listed on the National Register of Historic Places in 1984.

== Description and history ==
The Somerset Academy building is located on the north side of Academy Street, a short way east of Brighton Road (Maine State Routes 150/151). The main building is a 2-1/2 story brick structure, with a front-facing gable roof, and there is a large modern addition to the rear. The front (south-facing) facade is three bays wide, articulated by brick piers, with sash windows on both levels in the outer bays. The center bay is finished in wooden clapboards, and has a simple entrance on the first floor, flanked by widely-set wooden pilasters and topped by an entablature and cornice. The second level has a sash window flanked by pilasters. An entablature encircles the building below the roof line. The front gable is finished in flushboard, with an eyebrow window at its center. Centered on the ridge, a two-stage square tower rises; the first stage is simple, finished in clapboards with cornerboards, while the second belfry stage has louvered round-arch openings and paneled corner pilasters. A simple balustrade tops the tower.

The building was constructed in 1846 by Joseph Bigelow, a regionally well-known builder of the period from Skowhegan. Money for its construction was raised by subscription, the largest donation coming from John Ware, who also gave the land. The building now hosts the River of Life Church and a local chapter of the American Legion.

== See also ==
- National Register of Historic Places listings in Somerset County, Maine
