= Former First Baptist Church (Skowhegan, Maine) =

Historic church in Maine, United States

- First Baptist Church, Former
- U.S. National Register of Historic Places
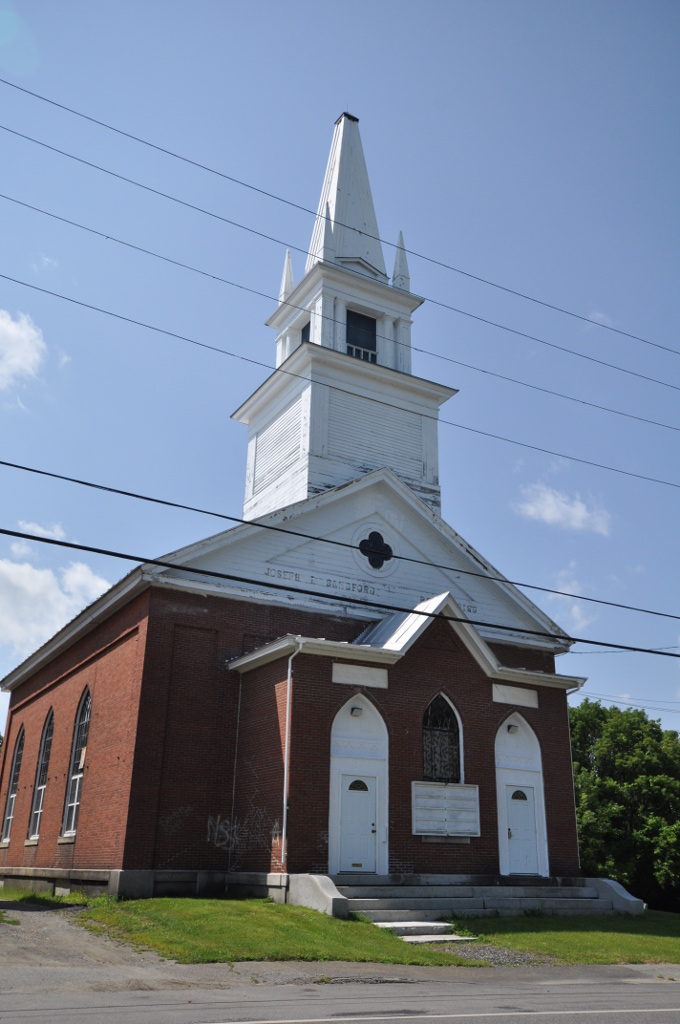

- Location within Maine Location within the United States
- Location: 37 Main Street, Skowhegan, Maine
- Coordinates: 44°45′37″N 69°43′3″W
- Area: less than one acre
- Built: 1842
- Architect: Joseph Bigelow; Charles J. Schumacher
- Architectural style: Greek Revival, Gothic Revival
- NRHP reference No.: 91000770
- Added to NRHP: June 21, 1991

The Former First Baptist Church is a historic church building at 37 Main Street in Skowhegan, Maine. Built in 1842-44, this Greek Revival brick building is one of the few works attributable to a local master builder, Joseph Bigelow. It was used as a church until 1919, after which it was used as a community center, and then a VFW hall until 2009. It is (as of 2013) vacant, with plans to establish a performance and meeting venue; it was listed on the National Register of Historic Places in 1991.

== Description and history ==
The former First Baptist Church is set on the west side of Main Street in Skowhegan, just south of its junction with Maine State Route 104, and next to the 1807 Bloomfield Academy building. It is a roughly rectangular brick structure, with a front-facing gable roof and a granite foundation. The main block is augmented by a projecting vestibule in the front, and a vestry addition in the rear. The vestibule is three bays wide, with a pair of double-doors set in lancet-arched openings flanking a central sash window, also set in a lancet-arch opening. The roofline of the vestibule has a shallow pitch, with a central front-facing gable. Behind the vestibule the main facade was originally five bays wide, separated by brick pilasters, of which only the outermost are now fully visible. The main roof gable is fully pedimented, and is finished in flushboarding with a recessed central section that has a quatrefoil window.

The congregation for which the church was built was established in 1796, and its first meetinghouse, built in 1812, was destroyed by fire in 1841. The present building was built to replace it; it was designed by Joseph Bigelow and completed in 1844. It is one of a small number of buildings with documentary connection to Bigelow, a locally renowned master builder. Growth of the congregation prompted enlargement of the building in the 1880s, at which time the vestry and vestibule were added. This remodeling campaign probably also included artwork by Portland artist Charles Schumacher, work that was lost due to subsequent alterations. The church was closed in 1919 when the Baptists merged with the local Congregational church. In 1926 the building was adapted for use as a community center, which included construction of a basketball court in its interior. It later housed the headquarters of the local National Guard organization, and served as a meeting space for the local Veterans of Foreign Wars chapter until 2009. After a period of town ownership, it was purchased by a private owner (Todd Smith) with plans to rehabilitate the building as a meeting venue.

The building was listed on the National Register of Historic Places in 1991.

== See also ==
- National Register of Historic Places listings in Somerset County, Maine
