= North Anson, Maine =

Coordinates: 44°52′12″N 69°53′39″W

North Anson is a village and Census-designated place in the northeastern part of the town of Anson, Somerset County, Maine, United States.

== History ==
According to an 1886 History of Anson, Maine, "In 1845 [Anson] was divided, and North Anson incorporated out of it; but a re-union of the parts took place in 1855. North Anson has in the "Union Advocate" a valuable local and county paper. It is issued every Wednesday by Albert Moore & Son. Its politics are democratic. The Congregationalists, Free Baptists, Methodists and Universalists each have churches in Anson. The town has twenty-one public schoolhouses; the total school property being valued at $3,500. Anson Academy, located at North Anson Village, is a well-established and thriving institution. Many able and successful business and professional men have received here a large part of their education at these schools. The valuation of the town in 1870 was $554,407. In 1880, it was $585,080. The population in 1870 was 1,745. In 1880, it was 1,557. "

== Today ==
Mark Emery School and Anson Academy have since been replaced by Carrabec Community School for K-8 and Carrabec High School for 9–12. The name Carrabec was created by the schools' first class. They decided to name it after the two rivers meeting in North Anson: the Kennebec and its tributary, the Carrabassett. Combined with Garret Schenck School and Solon Elementary, these schools make up RSU/MSAD 74. This district includes the towns of Anson, Solon, Embden, and New Portland. There used to be elementary schools in Embden and New Portland but they have since closed down.

As of June 14, 2007, Pan Am Railways had reopened a spur line which ran to North Anson. It had been abandoned for over twenty years. Rail service on the line ended in 2013. On November 30, 2021, it was announced that the State of Maine had acquired the former rail line for conversion into a multi-use rail trail, as part of a larger project to create a trail from Oakland to Embden. This location is part of the town of Anson.
