= MaineHealth =

US regional nonprofit health care system

- Formation: 1874
- Headquarters: Portland, Maine
- Services: Health system
- Chief Executive Officer: Andrew T. Mueller, MD
- Affiliations: Tufts University
- Website: https://www.mainehealth.org/

MaineHealth is a regional nonprofit health care system that comprises a network of hospitals, health care facilities, and clinics in Maine and New Hampshire. The system is affiliated with the Tufts University School of Medicine for both teaching and research. It is the largest hospital system in northern New England.

MaineHealth includes a Level I trauma center/teaching hospital; seven community hospitals and two community hospital campuses of Maine Medical Center; three specialty hospitals including Maine's only children's hospital; NorDx, a health sciences laboratory; and the MaineHealth Institute for Research. MaineHealth hospitals have been lauded by regional and national organizations.

Maine Medical Center received its first National Institutes of Health research grant in 1962. The MaineHealth Institute for Research has researched potential chronic diseases such as Chronic Lyme disease and Long COVID. A blood-based biomarker test for cancer, currently in clinical trials, was developed by MaineHealth in conjunction with the University of New England. In 2025, the federal government cut $250,000 in annual funding for the MaineHealth Institute of Research due to its research on vaccine hesitancy.

MaineHealth is the largest private employer in Maine, employing more than 22,000 workers.

== History ==
Maine Medical Center was founded in 1874 as Maine General Hospital. In 1998, the Barbara Bush Children's Hospital, named for first lady Barbara Bush, opened, sharing Maine Medical Center's campus. That same year, Maine Medical Center and Barbara Bush Children's Hospital established MaineHealth.

In October 2025, MaineHealth mailed death notices to 531 living patients, informing them that they had died and providing instructions about how to resolve their estates.

In January 2026, MaineHealth experienced a higher number of staff "call-outs" due to the heightened presence of federal Immigration and Customs Enforcement in the state. In August of 2026, a MaineHealth nurse was detained by ICE, leading to protests from National Nurses United, the nurses union at Maine Medical Center. The nurse was later released.

== Facilities ==
=== Hospitals ===
- Maine Medical Center: Portland, Biddeford, and Sanford
- Franklin Hospital: Farmington
- Lincoln Hospital: Damariscotta
- Mid Coast Hospital: Brunswick
- Memorial Hospital: North Conway, New Hampshire
- Pen Bay Hospital: Rockport
- Stephens Hospital: Norway
- Waldo Hospital: Belfast
- York Hospital: York

=== Specialty care hospitals ===
- Barbara Bush Children's Hospital: Portland
- Behavioral Health at Spring Harbor: Westbrook
- New England Rehabilitation Hospital: Portland (joint venture with Encompass Health)
