= Miller & Mayo =

Architectural firm in Portland, Maine

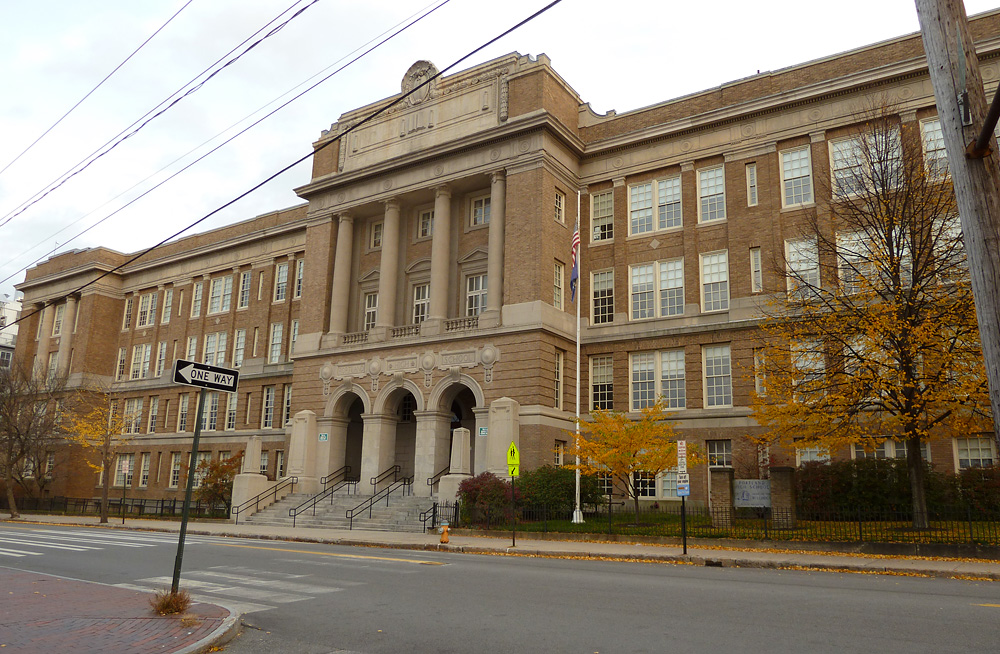
Portland High School, Portland, 1916.

Miller & Mayo, later Miller, Mayo & Beal, was a prominent architectural firm from Portland, Maine, established in Lewiston in 1907.

== History ==
Miller & Mayo was established in January 1907 as the partnership of Lewiston architect William R. Miller and his head draftsman, Raymond J. Mayo. Seeking greater opportunities, they moved the office to Portland a year later, in 1908. The office had already had an essentially statewide reputation, but a move to Portland, the state's largest city, allowed work to be done there and in its suburbs.

The firm's work was diverse, but they placed special importance on the design of school buildings.

At about the same time Mayo became partner, Lester I. Beal was hired as a draftsman. In 1926, he became a partner, the firm becoming Miller, Mayo & Beal. That firm was dissolved in 1929 upon the withdrawal of Raymond J. Mayo, who opened his own office. The office became Miller & Beal, and Miller died on December 14. However, Beal continued to run the office as Miller & Beal, Inc.

== Architectural works ==
=== Miller & Mayo, 1907-1926 ===
- 1907 - Delbert D. Coombs House, 74 Winter St, Auburn, Maine
- 1907 - Elks' Club, Middle & Ash Sts, Lewiston, Maine
  - Demolished.
- 1907 - Morrison Memorial Building, 23 Main St, Dexter, Maine
- 1908 - Whitney Cottage, Good Will Home and School, Hinckley, Maine
- 1909 - Edward L. Bradford House, 28 Beacon Ave, Auburn, Maine
- 1909 - City National Bank Building, 111 Main St, Belfast, Maine
- 1909 - Amos Gerald House, 107 Main St, Fairfield, Maine
- 1909 - Rangeley Inn, 2443 Main St, Rangeley, Maine
- 1910 - Frederic C. Dudley House, 22 Deblois St, Portland, Maine
- 1910 - Mechanics Institute, 44-56 Congress St, Rumford, Maine
- 1911 - Berry Hall, New Hampton School, New Hampton, New Hampshire
- 1911 - Maine Supply Building, 415 Lisbon St, Lewiston, Maine
- 1911 - Roberts Hall, Colby College (Old Campus), Waterville, Maine
  - Demolished.
- 1912 - Emery Department Store, 88 Main St, Waterville, Maine
- 1912 - Emery School, 79 Birch St, Biddeford, Maine
- 1912 - Lane Hall, New Hampton School, New Hampton, New Hampshire
- 1913 - Elks' Home, 15 Appleton St, Waterville, Maine
- 1913 - Purington Hall, Farmington State Normal School, Farmington, Maine
- 1913 - Stateway Apartments, 59 State St, Portland, Maine
- 1914 - East Hall, Gorham State Normal School, Gorham, Maine
- 1914 - Marlborough Apartments, 180-188 High St, Portland, Maine
- 1915 - David A. Calhoun House, 11 Cottage Farms Rd, Cape Elizabeth, Maine
- 1915 - B. C. Jordan Memorial Hall, 46 Temple Ave, Ocean Park, Maine
- 1916 - Portland High School, 284 Cumberland Ave, Portland, Maine
  - In association with G. Henri Desmond of Boston.
- 1916 - Shead High School, 89 High St, Eastport, Maine
- 1917 - Cascade School, Cascade St, Cascade, New Hampshire
- 1917 - Henry B. Estes House, 42 Hillcrest St, Auburn, Maine
- 1917 - Freeport High School, Howard Pl, Freeport, Maine
  - Burned in 1987.
- 1917 - Gorham Town Hall, 20 Park St, Gorham, New Hampshire
  - Based on the Paterson City Hall, built in 1896.
- 1917 - Oxford County Registry of Deeds, 38 Portland St, Fryeburg, Maine
- 1919 - Cottage Farm School, 51 Woodland Rd, Cape Elizabeth, Maine
  - Demolished.
- 1919 - Elms Apartments, 77 Elm St, Lewiston, Maine
- 1921 - Lewiston United Baptist Church, 250 Main St, Lewiston, Maine
  - Demolished in 2011.
- 1922 - Cyr Building, 179 Main St, Waterville, Maine
- 1922 - Lewiston Memorial Armory, 65 Central Ave, Lewiston, Maine
- 1922 - South Portland High School, 240 Ocean St, South Portland, Maine
- 1923 - Central Fire Station, 380 Congress St, Portland, Maine
- 1924 - Paquin Building, 5 Washington St, Biddeford, Maine
- 1924 - Maurice W. Pines House, 114 Bedford St, Portland, Maine
- 1925 - Lincoln School, 1338 Broadway, South Portland, Maine
- 1925 - Parish House for Woodfords Congregational Church, 202 Woodford St, Portland, Maine
- 1925 - Thomas B. Reed School, 28 Homestead Ave, Portland, Maine

=== Miller, Mayo & Beal, 1926-1929 ===
- 1926 - Edwin Gould School, Good Will Home and School, Hinckley, Maine
- 1926 - Norway High School, 219 Main St, Norway, Maine
- 1926 - Scarborough High School, Bessey School Dr, Scarborough, Maine
- 1927 - Marcotte Nursing Home, 102 Campus Ave, Lewiston, Maine
- 1929 - Northgate Apartments, 231 State St, Portland, Maine

== Gallery ==
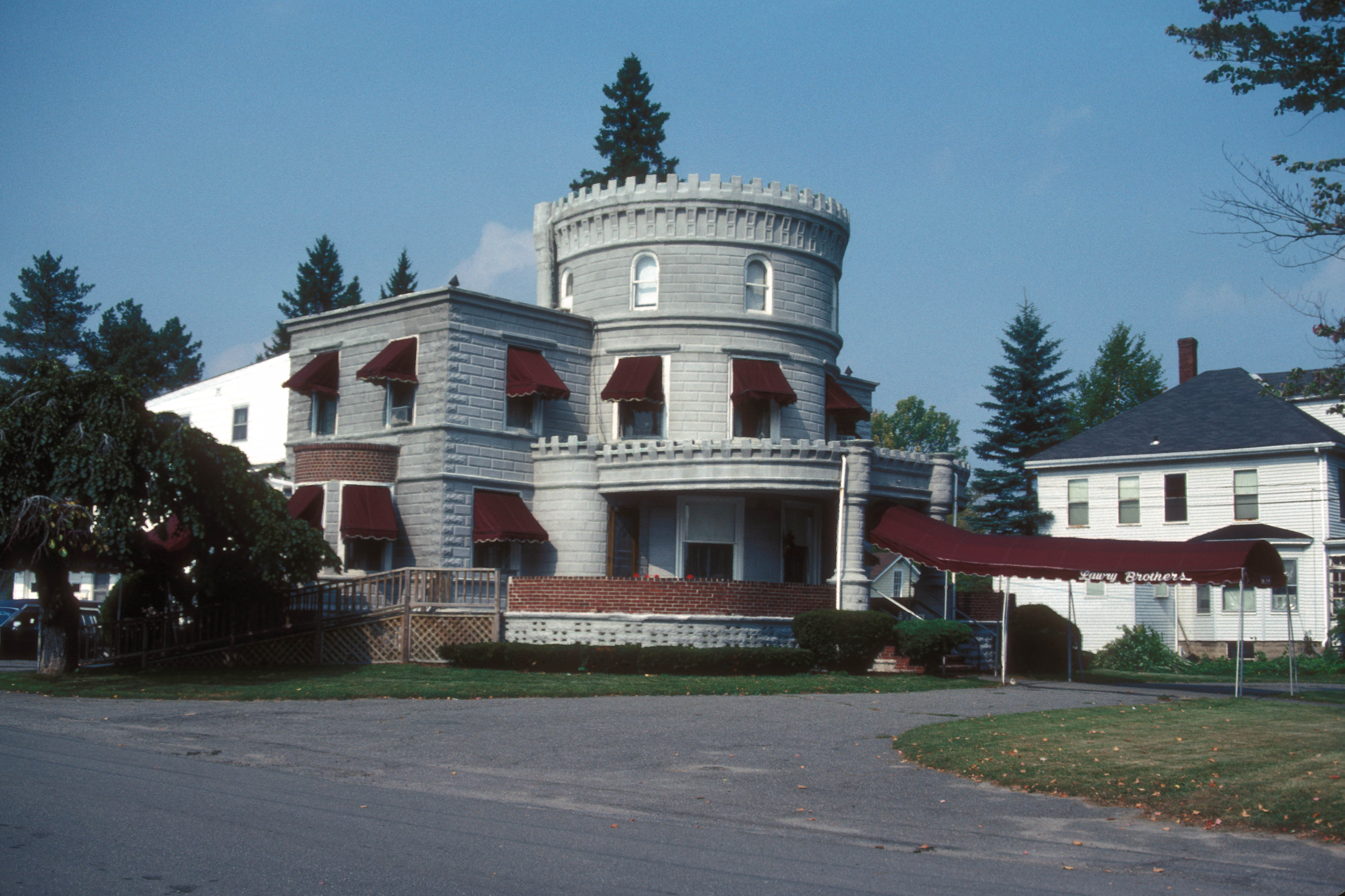
Amos Gerald House, Fairfield, 1909.

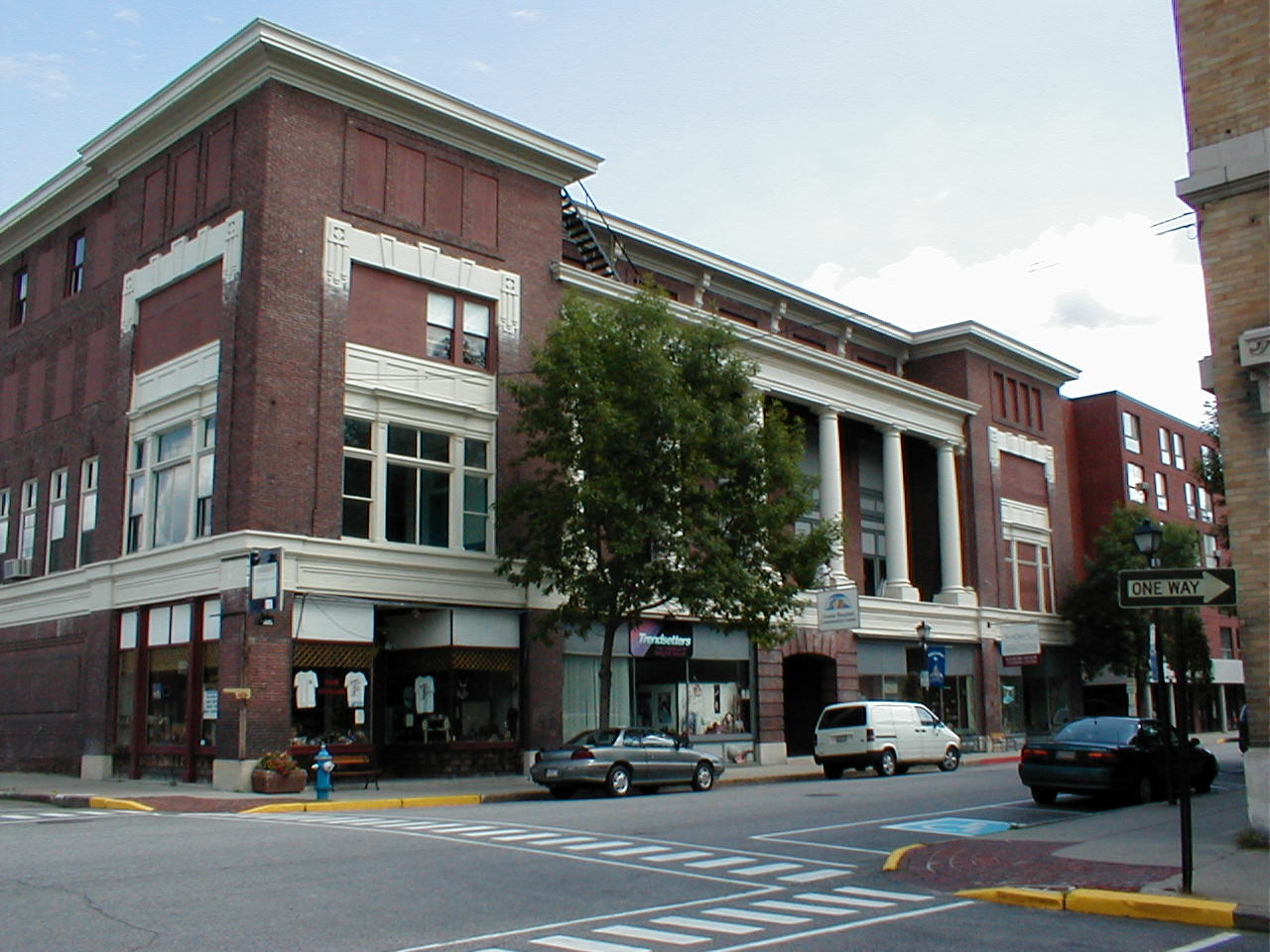
Mechanics Institute, Rumford, 1910.

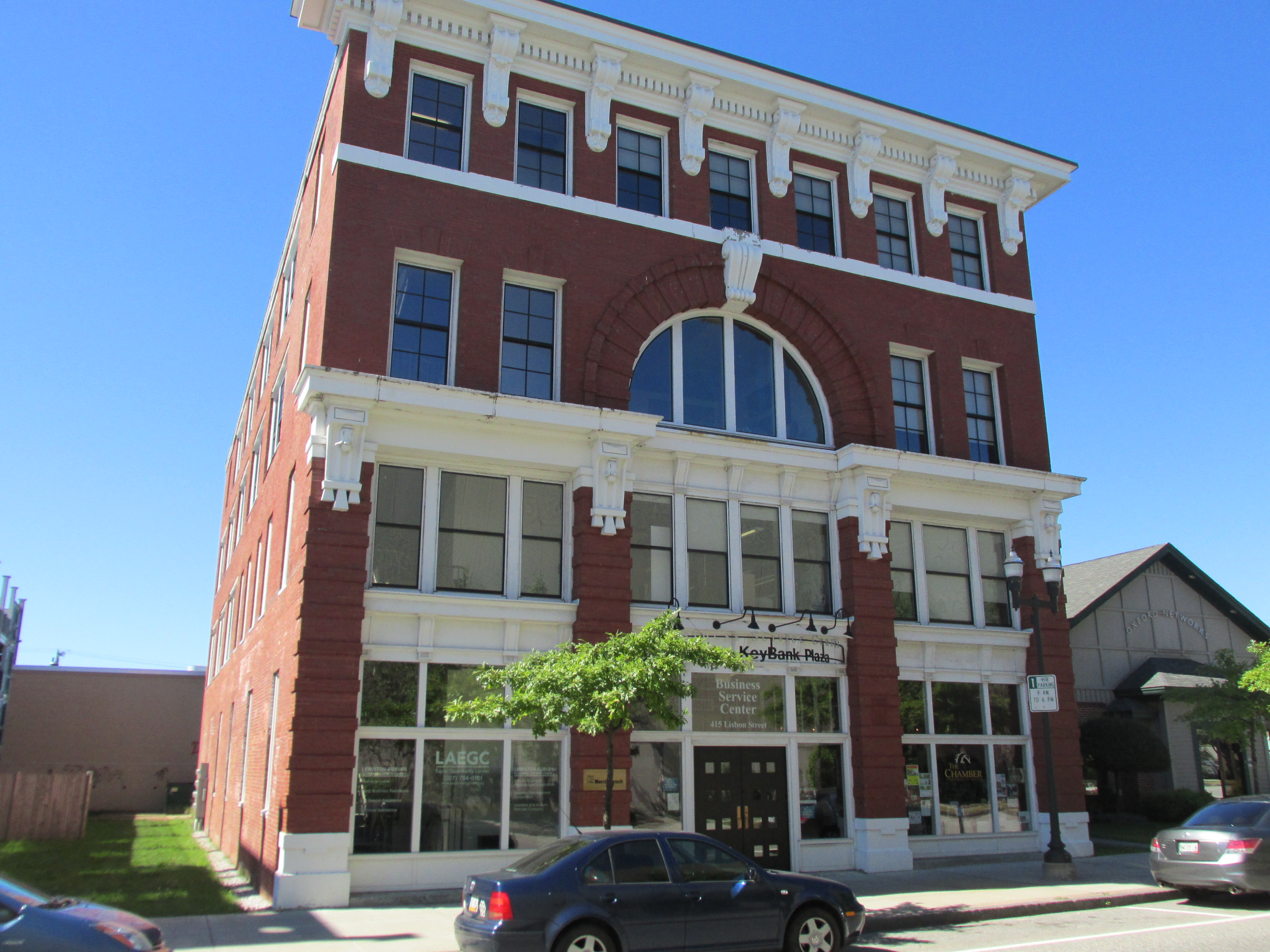
Maine Supply Building, Lewiston, 1911.

Roberts Hall, Colby College, 1911.

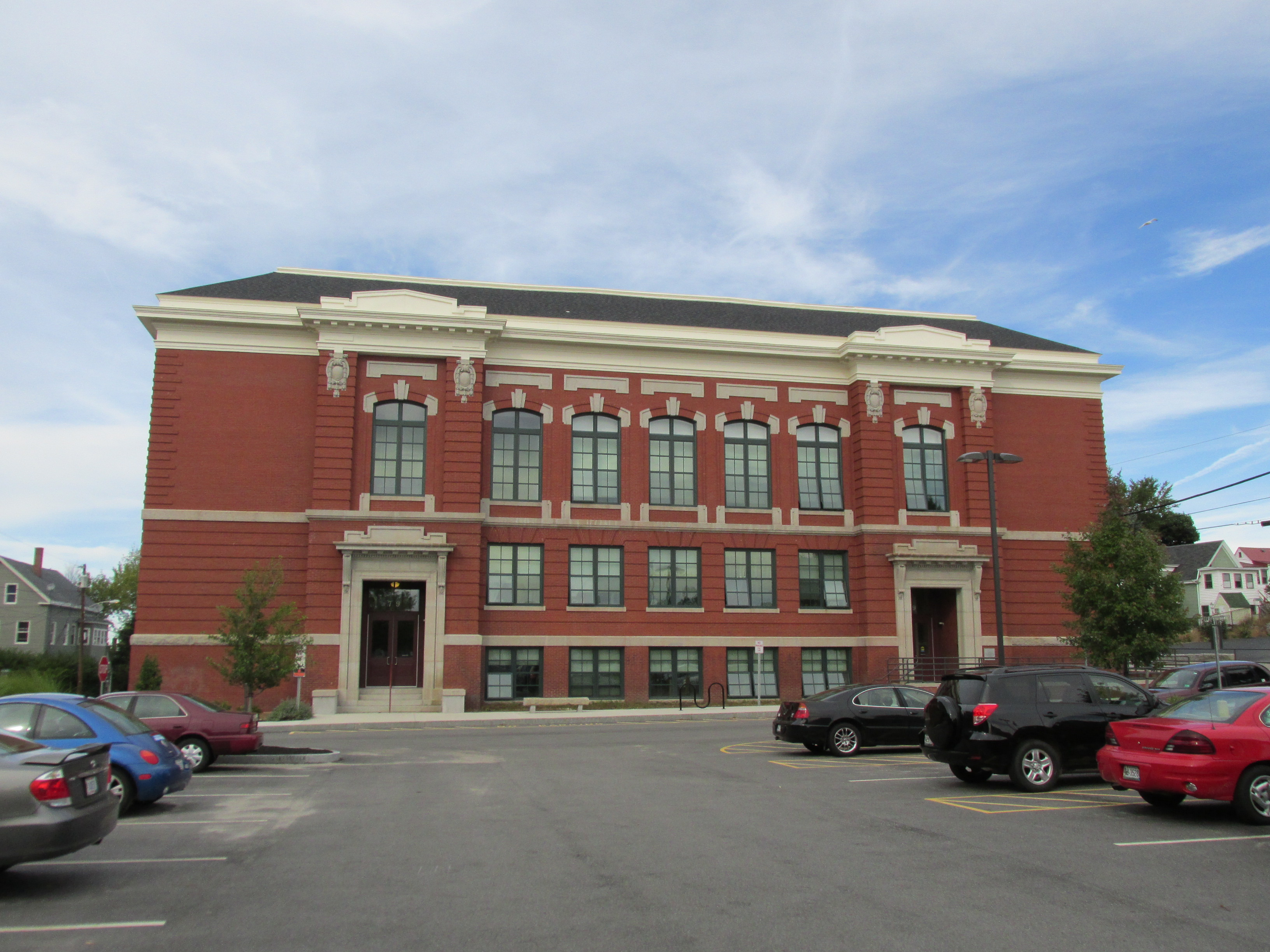
Emery School, Biddeford, 1912.

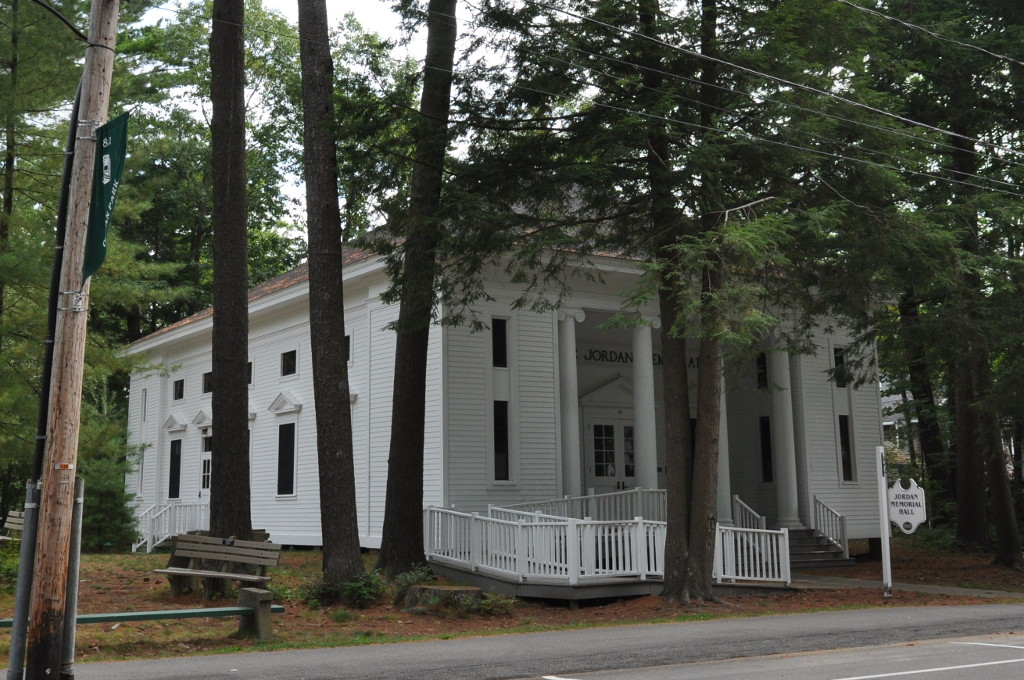
Jordan Memorial, Ocean Park, 1915.

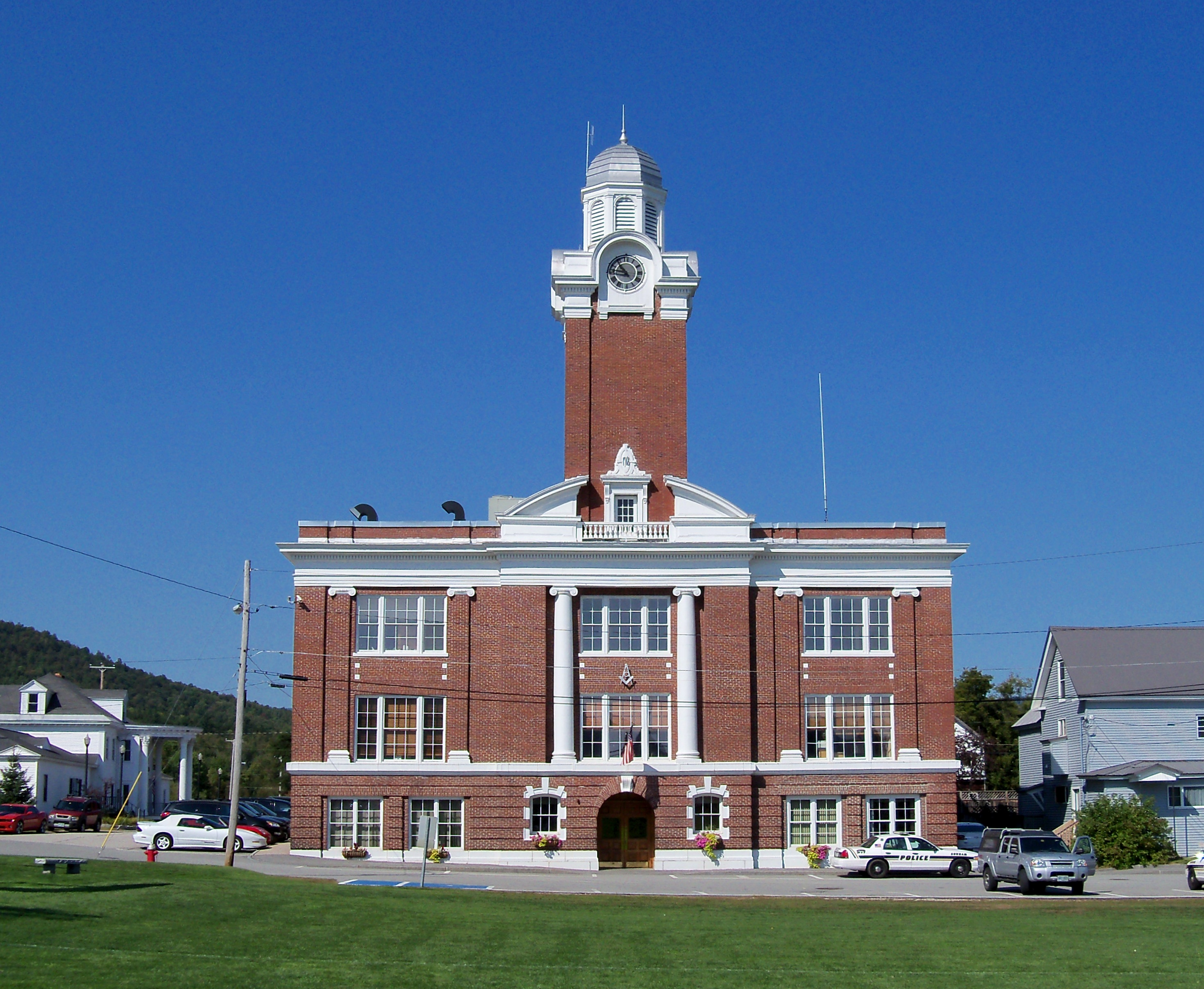
Gorham Town Hall, Gorham, 1917.

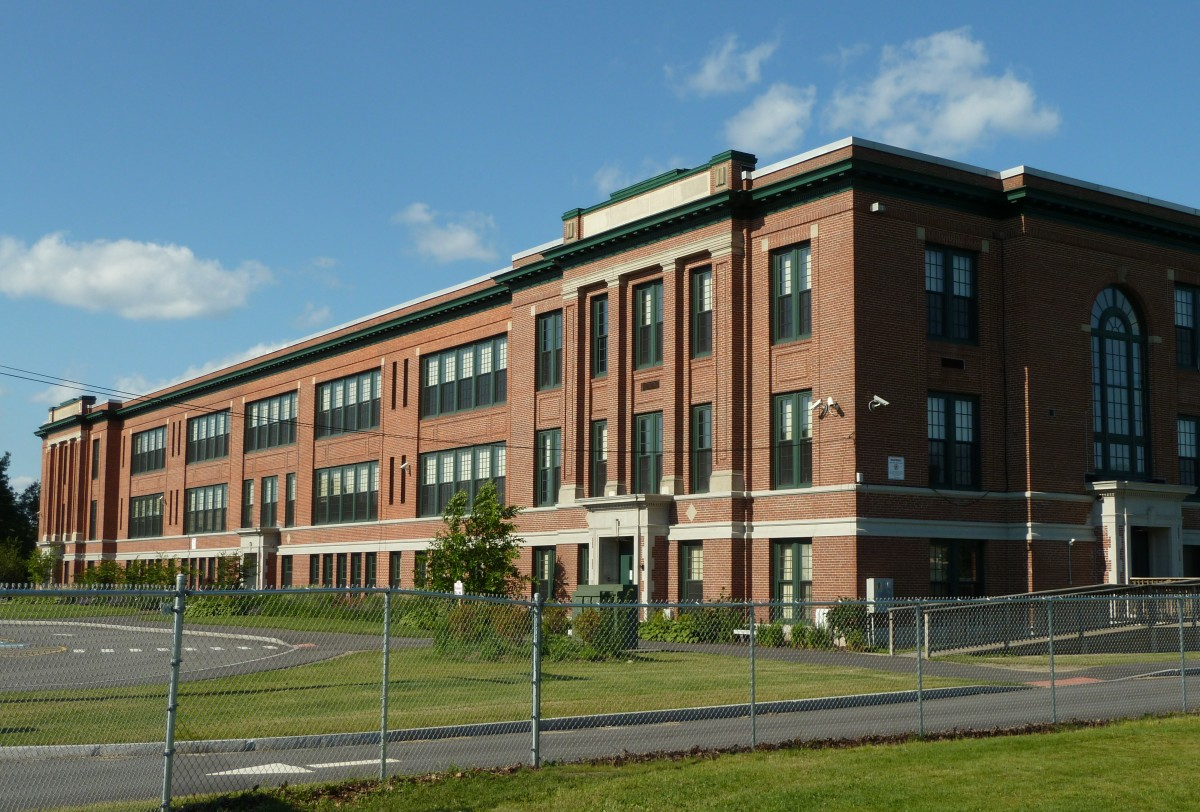
High School, South Portland, 1922.

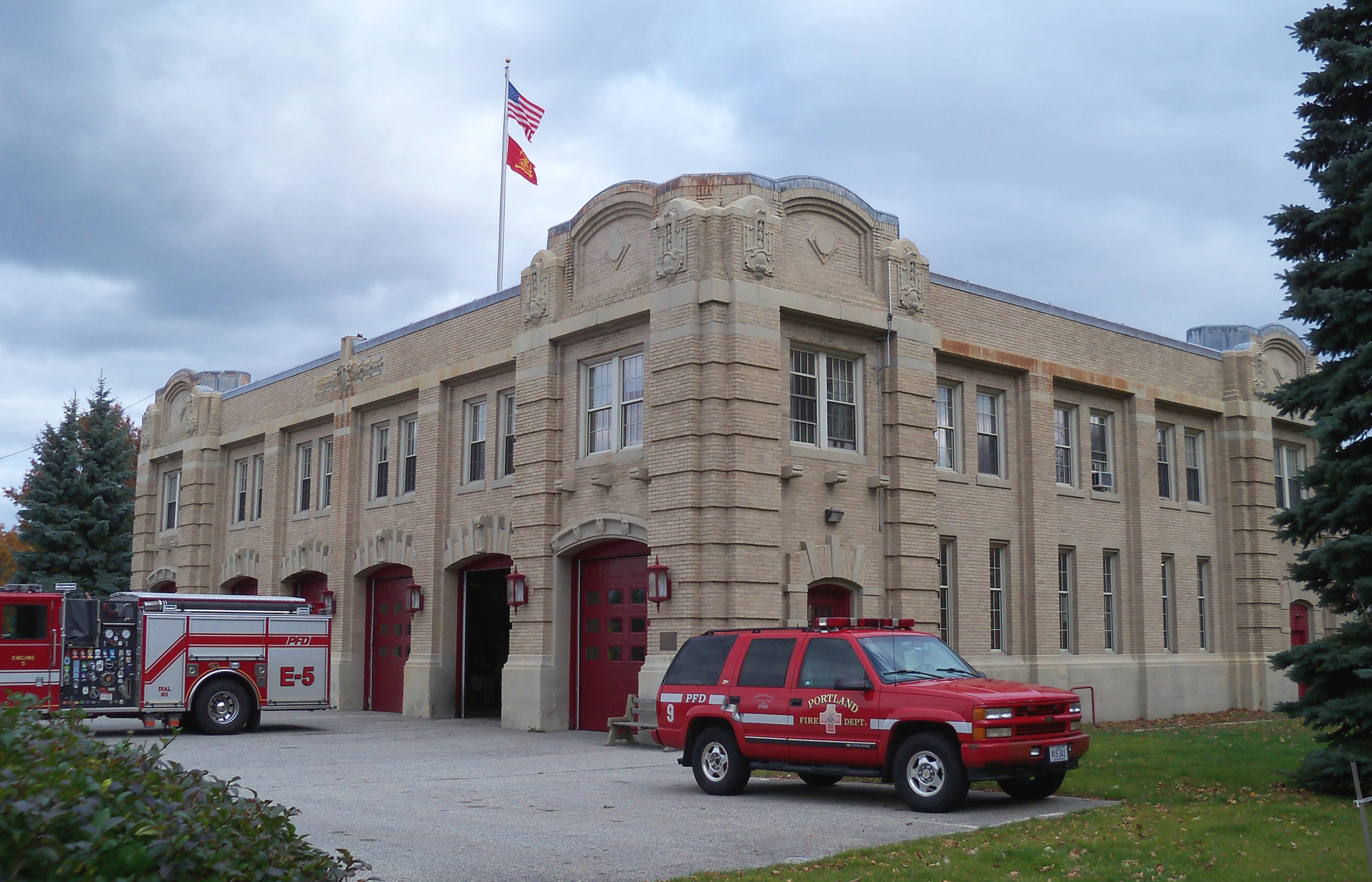
Central Fire Station, Portland, 1923.

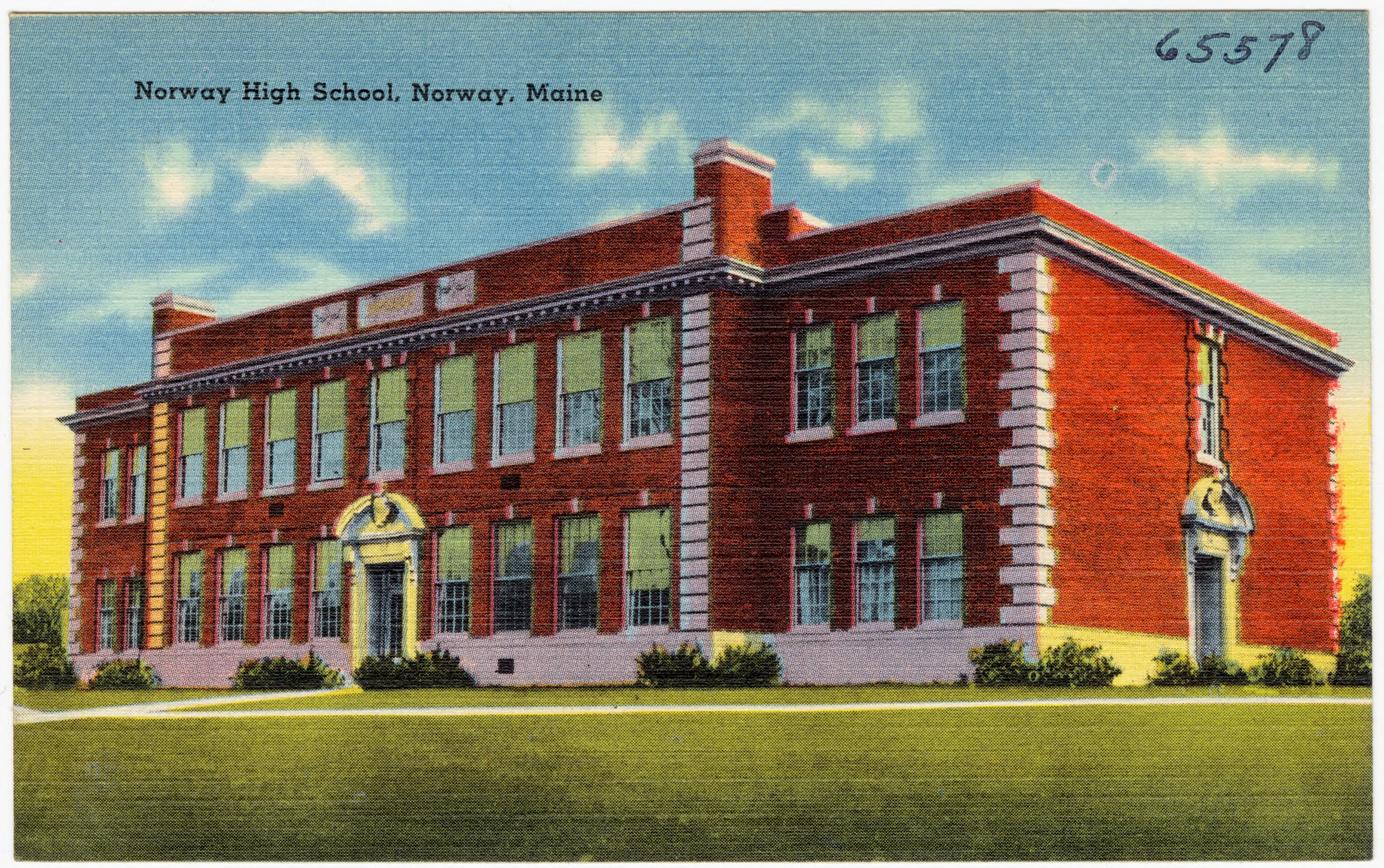
Norway High School, Norway, 1926.

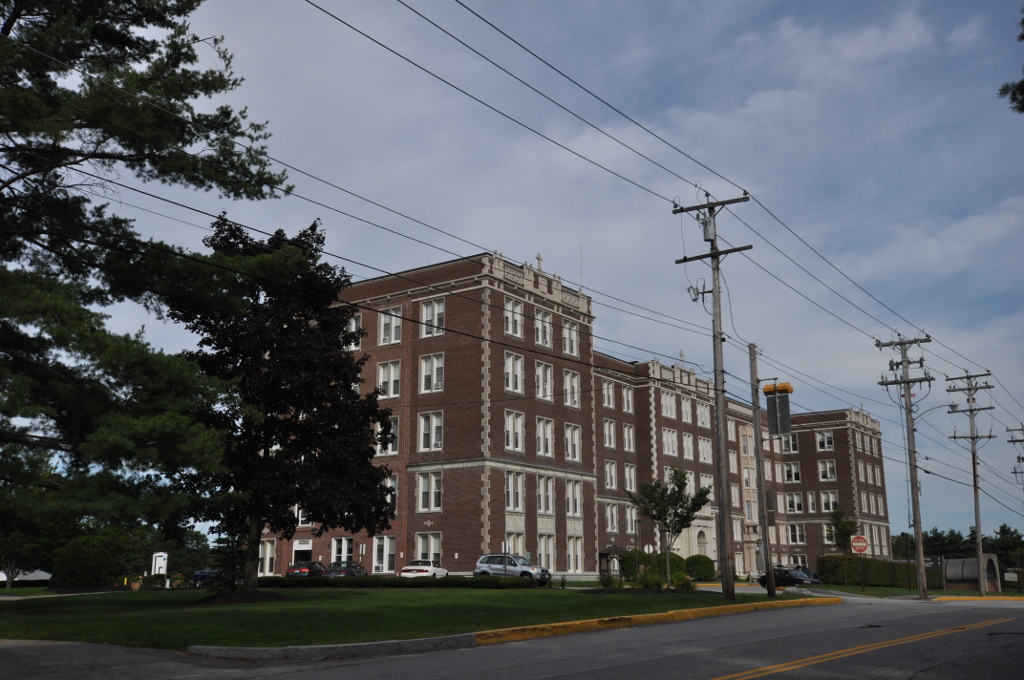
Marcotte Nursing Home, Lewiston, 1927.
