= Saint Mary's Regional Medical Center (Maine) =

- Covenant Health Systems

Geography
- Location: 93 Campus Drive, Lewiston, Maine, United States

Services
- Emergency department: Yes
- Beds: 233

History
- Founded: 1888

Links
- Website: http://www.stmarysmaine.com
- Lists: Hospitals in Maine

St. Mary’s Health System, a member of Covenant Health, was founded in 1888 by the Sisters of Charity of Saint-Hyacinthe. Today, it is an integrated medical system comprising a 233-bed acute care community hospital, an employed group of primary care and specialty providers, urgent care and emergency department, an extensive complement of behavioral and mental health services and outpatient specialty practices. The system also includes d’Youville Pavilion, a senior care community that offers a rehabilitation center, long-term skilled nursing care and memory care. Its historic Saint Mary's General Hospital building, built in 1902, is listed on the National Register of Historic Places.

== Campus ==
The medical center is located just south of the Bates College campus in Lewiston, Maine. It occupies a triangular lot bounded by Campus Avenue and Golder and Sabattus Streets. Separating the medical center from the campus is St. Mary's d'Youville Pavilion, a senior care facility also operated by Covenant Health. Access to the hospital is via a circular drive on Sabattus Street. The facility's largest buildings are the result of expansion in the 1960s in 1970s.

== Services Offered ==
- Behavioral and Mental Health Services
- Cancer Care
- Cardiovascular Care
- Community Clinical Services
- Diagnostic Imaging Services
- Digestive Health
- Emergency Department
- Ear, Nose, and Throat Surgery
- General Surgery
- Laboratory Services
- MaineHealth at St. Mary’s
- Neurology
- Nutrition Center
- Orthopedics
- Primary Care
- Pulmonary Medicine
- Rehabilitation
- Rheumatology
- Senior Health
- Sleep Disorders
- Urology
- Urgent Care
- WorkMed Occupational Health
- Wound Care & Specialty Services

== Parent Company ==
St. Mary’s Health System is a member of Covenant Health, which is a not-for-profit Catholic regional health care system. Covenant’s family of organizations includes hospitals, skilled nursing and rehabilitation centers, assisted living, independent senior residences and adult day care organizations throughout New England and in Elmhurst Township, Pennsylvania. It is New England’s largest non-profit post-acute care provider.

== History ==
The year was 1888. Lewiston/Auburn was emerging as one of the state’s leading manufacturing centers. The shoe and textile industries were flourishing. The migration of the French Canadians, mostly from Quebec Province was huge, at times reaching to 100 to 150 arriving each day at the Grand Trunk Railroad Station on Lincoln Street. The population had increased to 35,000 but there was no hospital.

This changed in June 1888 when the Sisters of Charity of St. Hyacinthe purchased a house on Sabattus Street along with 36 acres of land, all owned by Sarah J. Golder. The Golder house became a 30-bed hospital with an addition that lodged the sisters and 40 orphans. This hospital, the first in Lewiston/Auburn and the first Catholic hospital in Maine became known variously as the Sister’s Hospital, the French Hospital, or the Catholic Hospital. The cost for a stay was $5.00 per week for a bed in the ward or $10.00 to $12.00 per week for a private room.

The sisters were determined to convey that the hospital was open to people of all faiths and ethnic backgrounds. This is evidenced in the name of the first patient admitted, Nellie Hackett, herself not of French Canadian heritage.

By 1898 the Medical Staff is organized with Dr. Alonzo Garcelon as its first president, the Society Dames Patronesses (Auxiliary) was formed along with the Men’s Hospital Association (Patrons).

The City of Lewiston responded to a small pox epidemic in 1899 by establishing a “Pest House” in which patients were quarantined. Records show that the sisters gave 162 days of nursing care there in the “Pest House.”

The need for a larger hospital became clear and in 1902 a separate hospital was built providing 150 beds and 25 bassinets. The cost of the construction was $100,000.

- Saint Mary's General Hospital
- U.S. National Register of Historic Places
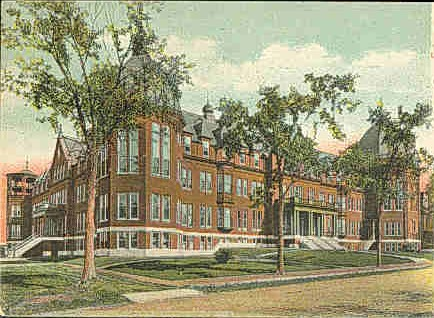
- St. Mary's Hospital from 1908 postcard

- Location within Maine Location within the United States
- Location: 318 Sabattus St., Lewiston, Maine
- Coordinates: 44.10094°N 70.20022°W
- Area: 6.3 acres (2.5 ha)
- Built: 1902
- Architect: William R. Miller; Father Paul Charland
- Architectural style: Late Gothic Revival
- NRHP reference No.: 87002191
- Added to NRHP: December 30, 1987

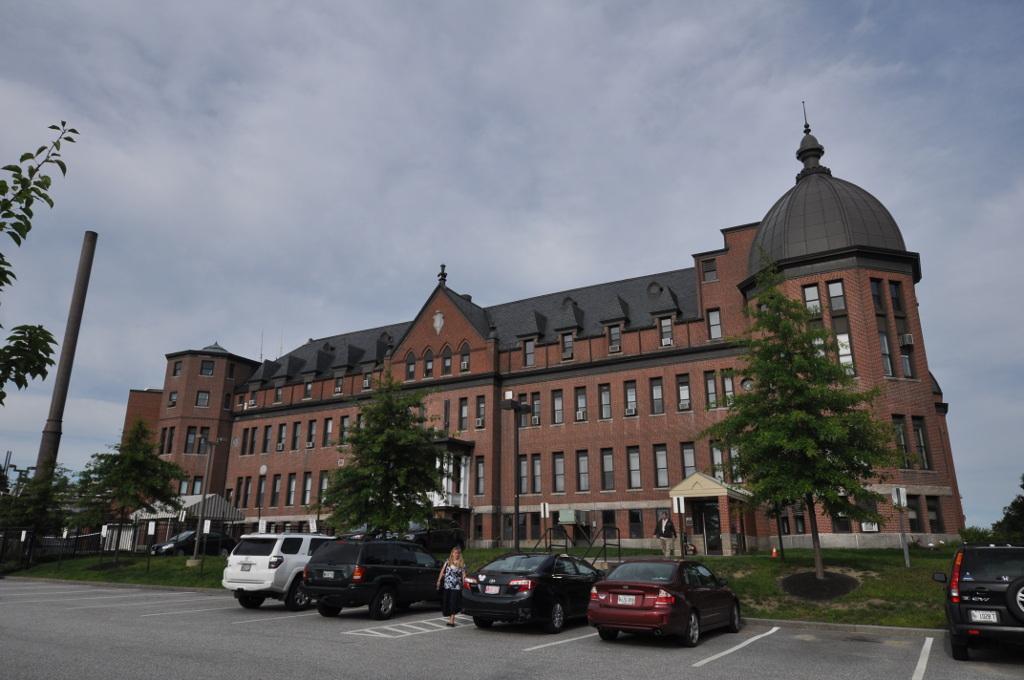
2014 view

The historic facade faces Sabattus St. but the doorway there is a minor entrance, if it is open at all. It was 45 Golder St. (per NRIS) ??? in 1987. Lewiston, Maine

The hospital was designed in Late Gothic Revival style by Lewiston architect William R. Miller (186-1929) and by amateur architect Father Paul Charland.

The building was completed in 1902.

Since 1902 various renovations, expansions, and modernizations have expanded Saint Mary's to become a larger medical complex.

In 1908 the name officially became L’Hopital Generale Ste. Marie – St. Mary’s General Hospital.

Also in 1908, St. Mary’s School of Nursing was established. By 1925, a house on the corner of Golder and Sabattus Streets was remodeled and became the Nurses’ Residence.

Realizing that there was a need to care for the poor, sick, and infirm elderly, the sisters built the Marcotte Nursing Home in 1928 with a donation of $120,000 from F. X. Marcotte, one of the early French Canadian business owners. One wing of this building was devoted to the care of the elderly with 200 beds available; the southern wing, called St. Joseph’s Orphanage, was home to 250 girls. Most of the girls were not orphans but rather children whose both parents needed to work the long shifts in the mills. The sisters were actually providing the much needed child care for these immigrants. The young girls could stay at the “orphanage” until they were 18 years old with elementary schooling provided by the sisters right on site.

The historic Saint Mary's General Hospital building was listed on the National Register of Historic Places in 1987.

== See also ==
- National Register of Historic Places listings in Androscoggin County, Maine
- List of hospitals in Maine
