= List of hospitals in Maine =

This is a list of hospitals in the U.S. state of Maine, sorted by facility name by default.

== List ==
Name	Network	Settlement	County	Emergency Department? (Trauma Level)	Opened-Closed	Status / Type / Notes
Alfond Center for Health	MaineGeneral Health	Augusta	Kennebec	Yes		Active
Augusta Mental Health Institute	Department of Health and Human Services	Augusta	Kennebec	No		Closed - Behavioral health
Bridgton Hospital	Central Maine Healthcare	Bridgton	Cumberland	Yes		Active
Calais Community Hospital	Independent	Calais	Washington	Yes		Active
Cary Medical Center	Independent	Caribou	Aroostook	Yes		Active
Central Maine Medical Center	Central Maine Healthcare	Lewiston	Androscoggin	Yes (Level III)	c. 1860–present	Active
Dorothea Dix Psychiatric Center	Department of Health and Human Services	Bangor	Penobscot	No	1895–present	Active - Behavioral health
Down East Community Hospital	Independent	Machias	Washington	Yes		Active
Franklin Hospital	MaineHealth	Farmington	Franklin	Yes		Active
Houlton Regional Hospital	Independent	Houlton	Aroostook	Yes		Active
LincolHealth – Miles Campus	MaineHealth	Damariscotta	Lincoln	Yes		Active
Maine Medical Center – Biddeford	MaineHealth	Biddeford	York	Yes		Active
Maine Medical Center – Portland	MaineHealth	Portland	Cumberland	Yes (Level I)	1874–present	Active
Maine Medical Center – Sanford	MaineHealth	Sanford	York	Yes		Active
Mid Coast Hospital	MaineHealth	Brunswick	Cumberland	Yes	1991–present	Active
Millinocket Regional Hospital	Independent	Millinocket	Penobscot	Yes		Active
Mount Desert Island Hospital	Independent	Bar Harbor	Hancock	Yes		Active
Northern Light Acadia Hospital	Northern Light Health	Bangor	Penobscot	No		Active - Behavioral health
Northern Light AR Gould Hospital	Northern Light Health	Presque Isle	Aroostook	Yes		Active
Northern Light Blue Hill Hospital	Northern Light Health	Blue Hill	Hancock	Yes		Active
Northern Light CA Dean Hospital	Northern Light Health	Greenville	Piscataquis	Yes		Active
Northern Light Eastern Maine Medical Center	Northern Light Health	Bangor	Penobscot	Yes (Level II)		Active
Northern Light Maine Coast Hospital	Northern Light Health	Ellsworth	Hancock	Yes		Active
Northern Light Mayo Hospital	Northern Light Health	Dover-Foxcroft	Piscataquis	Yes		Active
Northern Light Mercy Hospital	Northern Light Health	Portland	Cumberland	Yes		Active
Northern Light Sebasticook Valley Hospital	Northern Light Health	Pittsfield	Somerset	Yes		Active
Northern Maine Medical Center	Independent	Fort Kent	Aroostook	Yes		Active
Pen Bay Medical Center	MaineHealth	Rockport	Knox	Yes		Active
Penobscot Valley Hospital	Independent	Lincoln	Penobscot	Yes		Active
Redington-Fairview General Hospital	Independent	Skowhegan	Somerset	Yes		Active
Riverview Psychiatric Center	Department of Health and Human Services	Augusta	Kennebec	No		Active - Behavioral health
Rumford Hospital	Central Maine Healthcare	Rumford	Oxford	Yes		Active
Saint Joseph Hospital	Covenant Health Systems	Bangor	Penobscot	Yes		Active
Saint Mary's Regional Medical Center	Covenant Health Systems	Lewiston	Androscoggin	Yes	1888–present	Active
Spring Harbor Hospital	MaineHealth	Westbrook	Cumberland	No		Active - Behavioral health hospital
Stephens Hospital	MaineHealth	Norway	Oxford	Yes		Active
Thayer Center for Health	MaineGeneral Health	Waterville	Kennebec	Yes		Active
Togus VA Medical Center	VA Maine Health Cate	Chelsea	Kennebec	Yes	1930–present	Active
Waldo County General Hospital	MaineHealth	Belfast	Waldo	Yes		Active
York Hospital	Independent	York	York	Yes		Active
