= LifeFlight of Maine =

Aeromedical organization in Maine, United States

- Established: 1998 (28 years ago)
- Founder: Tom Judge; Norm Dinerman
- Type: Medical transportation
- Headquarters: Maine
- Location: United States
- Services: Air ambulance
- Website: lifeflightmaine.org

LifeFlight of Maine is an air ambulance critical-care transport service which operates in Maine, United States. Maine's only air ambulance service, and non-profit, it is owned by a partnership between Northern Light Health and Central Maine Healthcare. It utilizes three modes of transport in patient movement: helicopters, an airplane and ambulances. As of 2025, its medical helicopters carry over 2,000 patients each year, departing from Bangor, Lewiston and Sanford.

The organization's aircraft are operated and maintained by LifeFlight Aviation Services (established in 2020), a wholly owned subsidiary of LifeFlight of Maine. The LifeFlight Foundation (established in 2003), a separate non-profit, raises funds and increases awareness of the organization's mission.

== History ==
Airmed Skycare was the predecessor to LifeFlight of Maine. It was involved in a crash over Casco Bay in 1993, resulting in the deaths of two crew members and the patient. The pilot, Sean Rafter, was the fourth and final person on board. He survived.

LifeFlight of Maine was established in 1998 by Tom Judge and Norm Dinerman. Helipads were installed at Sebasticook Valley Hospital and Central Maine Medical Center in 1999, in Swan's Island in 2002 and at Maine Medical Center in 2019. In 2025, the construction of a helipad in Bar Harbor was confirmed. Helipads are not required for LifeFlights to land.

MedComms, its privately owned dispatch service, is based in Bangor. In 2022, LifeFlight of Maine switched from using an external aviation operator, Global Medical Response, to having an in-house system, which was expected to save the company around $800,000 per year.

== Fleet ==
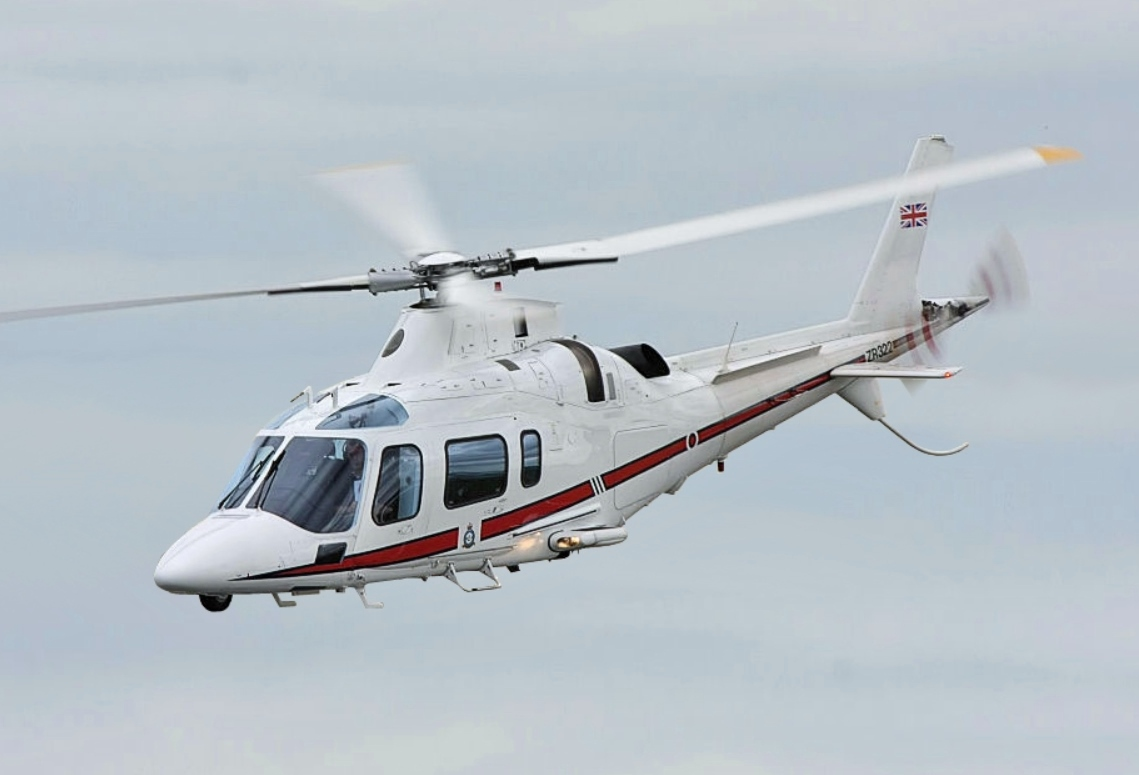
An AgustaWestland 109

The service began in 1998 with an AgustaWestland A109C, followed by an A109C Max. In 2004, two A109E helicopters (N901CM and N901EM) were purchased. A third helicopter, N901LF, the first of three A109SP Grand News, was added in 2020. It was followed in 2021 by N901XM. The third, and most recent, addition was N901WM in 2022. The SP helicopters travel at an average speed of 165 miles per hour (266 km/h). They have a range of 175 miles (282 km) and fuel for a two-hour flight.

N901EM, N901LF (each LifeFlight 1) and the fixed-wing Beechcraft B200 Super King Air (LifeFlight 3; N901LM) are based in Bangor; N901WM (LifeFlight 4) is based in Sanford; and N901XM (LifeFlight 2) is split between Lewiston and Bangor.

As of 2024, three dedicated ambulances were in operation.

== Personnel ==
As of 2025, LifeFlight of Maine's chief executive officer is Joe Kellner; its chief operating officer is Bill Cyr.

== Recognition ==
The organization received accreditation from the Commission on Accreditation of Medical Transport Systems (CAMTS) in 2017. In 2025, it was awarded the Salute to Excellence Safety Award by Vertical Aviation International.
