= Senator Cyr =

Senator Cyr may refer to:

- Edward P. Cyr (1914–1992), Maine State Senate
- Julian Cyr (born 1986), Massachusetts State Senate
