= Northern Light A.R. Gould Hospital =

- Location within Maine

Geography
- Location: Presque Isle, Aroostook County, Maine, United States
- Coordinates: 46°40′46″N 68°0′8″W

Organization
- Network: Northern Light Health

Services
- Emergency department: Level II trauma center
- Beds: 161 (89 at A.R. Gould Memorial Hospital, and 72 at the Aroostook Health Center)

Helipads
- Helipad: yes

History
- Founded: 1912

Links
- Website: https://northernlighthealth.org/A-R-Gould-Hospital
- Lists: Hospitals in Maine

Northern Light A.R. Gould Hospital (frequently shortened to ARG), formerly known as The Aroostook Medical Center (TAMC), is a hospital located in Presque Isle, Maine that is governed by a local volunteer board of trustees. It is named for former U.S. Senator and businessman Arthur R. Gould.

A.R. Gould has more than 60 physicians on their active medical staff and more than 1,000 employees. A.R. Gould Hospital offers a variety of services including an ambulance service, advanced cancer care, cardiology, dialysis, sleep medicine, imaging, emergency response, orthopedic services, primary care, pediatric primary care and OBGYN services.

== History ==
Arthur R. Gould was a resident of Presque Isle for nearly 60 years. In 1955 the city hospital had outgrown its facilities and new construction was planned on a 30-acre (12 ha) farm on the outskirts of town. Fundraising began the following year, and was accelerated with the Ford Foundation grant of $27,500. Gould's only surviving child, Marie Gould Wildes and her husband W. H. Wildes, surprised the committee with a donation of $100,000. The hospital was promptly named the Arthur R. Gould Memorial Hospital.
