= Edward P. Cyr =

American businessperson and politician

Edward P. Cyr (May 3, 1914 – January 9, 1992) was an American businessperson and politician from Maine. Cyr represented Madawaska, Maine during his six terms in the Maine Legislature. He served from 1959 to 1964 as a Republican in the Maine Senate. Cyr, now a Democrat, was elected to the Maine House of Representatives in 1970 and returned to the Senate two years later. He served his sixth and final term in the Senate in 1973–74.

Cyr was a prominent businessperson in Aroostook County. He built and owned Madawaska's first shopping center and was involved with several energy generating projects.

Cyr died on January 9, 1992, at Northern Maine Medical Center.
