= Marcotte Nursing Home =

- U.S. National Register of Historic Places
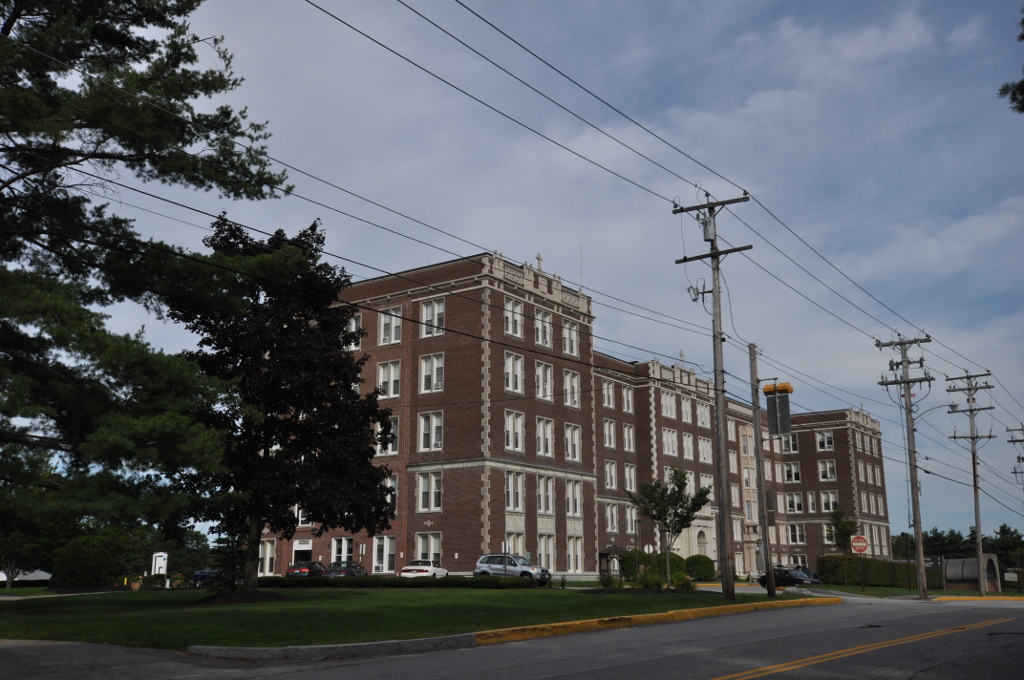

- Location within Maine Location within the United States
- Location: Lewiston, Maine
- Coordinates: 44°6′9″N 70°11′59″W
- Built: 1927
- Architect: Miller, Mayo & Beal
- Architectural style: Tudor Revival
- NRHP reference No.: 85003128
- Added to NRHP: December 26, 1985

Marcotte Nursing Home is an historic elder care facility at 102 Campus Avenue in Lewiston, Maine. Built in 1927 and opened the following year, it was the largest facility of its type in New England, representing a major step forward in the region's elder care. It was listed on the National Register of Historic Places in 1985. It is now part of the d'Youville Pavilion of Saint Mary's Regional Medical Center.

== Description and history ==
The former Marcotte Nursing Home building is located on the north side of Campus Avenue, just east of the Bates College campus, and across the street from the main medical facilities of Saint Mary's Regional Medical Center. It is a five-story masonry structure, built of brick with cast stone trim in the Tudor Revival style. In addition to load-bearing brick walls, it has iron beams for added support. Its stairwells are built with steel framing clad in brick. The interior floor framing is wood, and the walls are plaster on lath. There are three (former) principal entrances on the street facade, sheltered by round-arch porticos. The modern d'Youville Pavilion extends to the rear.

The Marcotte Nursing Home was founded through the efforts of Francois Marcotte, a prominent local French-American businessman, and the local Society of the Sisters of Charity, a Roman Catholic aid organization. Marcotte began fundraising for its construction in 1926, and the building, designed by the Portland firm Miller, Mayo & Beal, was opened in 1928. The facility included nursing care facilities, an orphanage, and, uniquely for the time, 22 small apartments for indigent elderly. The latter were supported by an endowment from Marcotte. Marcotte himself later occupied one of the units, and died there in 1942.

== See also ==
- National Register of Historic Places listings in Androscoggin County, Maine
