= St. Joseph Hospital (Nashua, New Hampshire) =

- Covenant Health Systems
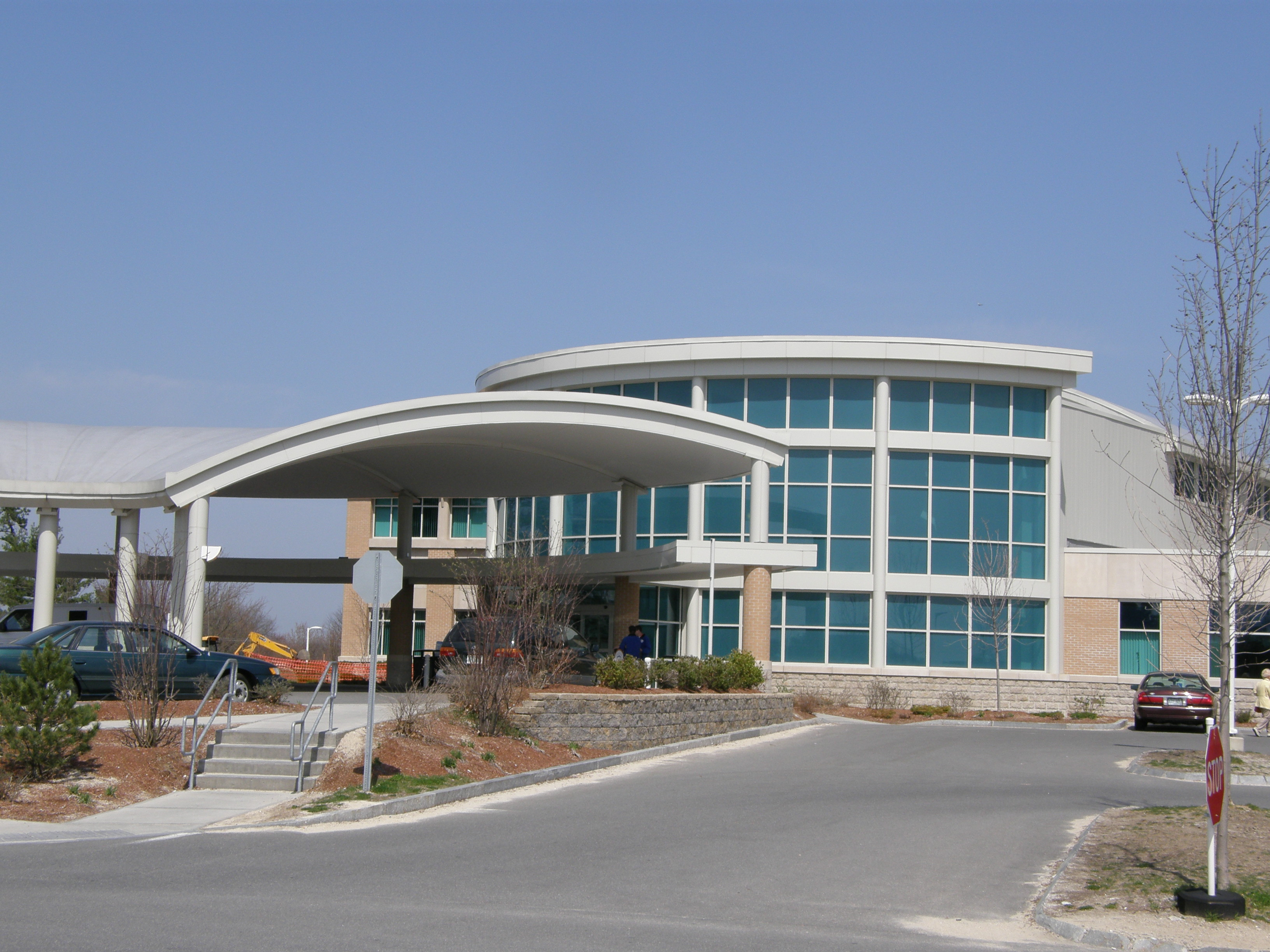

Geography
- Location: 172 Kinsley Street, Nashua, New Hampshire, United States
- Coordinates: 42°44′59″N 71°28′53″W

Organization
- Type: Community

Services
- Emergency department: Yes
- Beds: 208

History
- Founded: 1908

Links
- Website: http://www.stjosephhospital.com/
- Lists: Hospitals in New Hampshire

St. Joseph Healthcare is a network of hospitals and health care facilities in the greater Nashua area, southern New Hampshire and northern Massachusetts.

The main facility is the 208-bed St. Joseph Hospital, with satellite centers in Milford and Merrimack. The service is now part of Covenant Health Systems.

== History ==
St. Joseph Hospital was founded in 1908 on Kinsley Street in Nashua, by Monsignor Henri Milette, pastor of the parish of St. Louis de Gonzague primarily to serve Nashua's French Canadian community. From July 1907 it was run by the Sisters of Charity of Montreal. It is a Roman Catholic foundation, in the tradition of St. Marguerite d'Youville. The hospital was dedicated on May 1, 1908, the Feast of St. Joseph the Worker.

In 1938, the parish transferred ownership to the "Grey Nuns". A new facility was constructed in 1967, and the original building demolished. In 1976 Milford Medical Center opened as a satellite facility in Milford, New Hampshire, and the following year, another in Merrimack. In 1996, sponsorship was transferred from the Grey Nuns to Covenant Health Systems, a non-profit Catholic regional health care system. The Emergency Department at St. Joseph's underwent extensive renovation in 2014. St. Joseph's also hosts "Joseph's Closet", a program of New Hampshire Family Voices, which provides durable medical equipment free of charge to individuals in need.

== St. Joseph School of Nursing ==
The St. Joseph School of Nursing is a nursing school operated by the hospital. The first four students graduated in 1910. The RN program was discontinued in 1963, replaced in 1964 with a Practical Nursing program which ran until 2013. In 2005, the school established an Associate of Science in Nursing degree program. Upon completion of the ASN program, graduates are eligible to take the Licensure Examination for Registered Nurses.

The school is accredited by the Accrediting Commission of Career Schools and Colleges and the Accrediting Commission for Education in Nursing.
