= Mechanic Institute =

- U.S. National Register of Historic Places
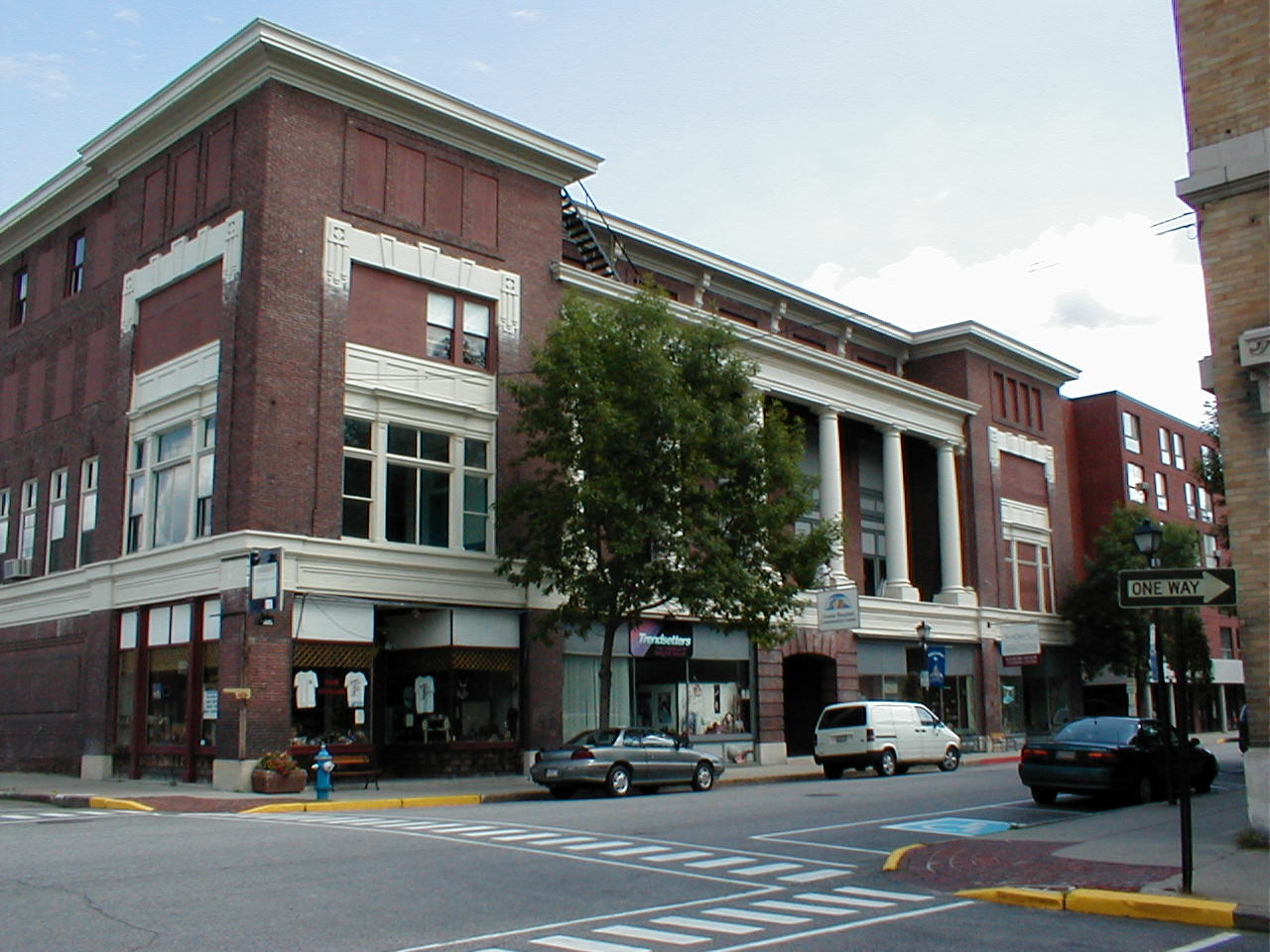

- Location within Maine Location within the United States
- Location: 44-56 Congress St., Rumford, Maine
- Coordinates: 44°32′46″N 70°32′45″W
- Area: 0.3 acres (0.12 ha)
- Built: 1910
- Built by: L. E. Bradstreet
- Architect: Miller & Mayo
- Architectural style: Classical Revival
- MPS: Rumford Commercial MRA
- NRHP reference No.: 80000241
- Added to NRHP: May 13, 1980

The Mechanic Institute is a historic educational building at 44-56 Congress Street in downtown Rumford, Maine. This handsome four-story brick building was built in 1910 by the Rumford Falls Power Company to provide educational facilities for its workers and their children. It is now owned by the city, and the former educational facilities have been repurposed into a community center. The building was listed on the National Register of Historic Places in 1980.

== Description and history ==
The Mechanic Institute is a large four-story brick structure located at the southeast corner of Congress and Exchange Streets in central Rumford, Maine. The main facade faces Congress Street, and has four plate glass storefronts with recessed entrances, and a centered entry to the upper levels. The entrance is shaped to resemble stone blocks, with a similar segmented arch above. The main feature of this facade is a recessed colonnade of six Doric columns rising two stories to an entablature and cornice, which above the central storefronts. The end bays have an array of tall windows, separated by pilasters and topped by an entablature on the second level, and four bays of sash windows (now mostly bricked in) at the third level, all of which is framed by two-story brick pilasters and topped by a lintel-like painted projecting with keystone outlines. The fourth level of the outer bays has four sash window spaces, now filled in, while the space above the colonnade in the central bays has a recessed cornice line with brackets.

The building was built in 1910 by the Rumford Power Falls Company, whose notably paternalistic attitude toward its workers included construction of high-quality housing at Strathglass Park. The purpose of the building was to provide a social and educational venue for its mill workers, with stores at the ground level, and educational and meeting spaces above. The building was designed by the Portland firm of Miller & Mayo, and built by L. E. Bradstreet of Hallowell. It is now owned by the city, which operates a community center in the upper levels.

== See also ==
- National Register of Historic Places listings in Oxford County, Maine
