= Edward H. Hill =

American physician (1844–1904)

- Born: May 7, 1844; Harrison, Maine, U.S.
- Died: July 17, 1904 (aged 60); Lewiston, Maine, U.S.
- Resting place: Riverside Cemetery, Lewiston, Maine
- Education: Bridgton Academy; Bates College (Maine State Seminary); Harvard Medical School
- Occupations: Physician, surgeon
- Known for: Founder of Central Maine Medical Center
- Spouse: Charlotte C. Thompson (m. 1872)
- Children: 2

Dr. Edward H. Hill (May 7, 1844–July 17 1904) was an American physician who founded Central Maine Medical Center in Lewiston, Maine.

He was born in Harrison, Maine on May 7, 1844 and attended Bridgton Academy, Bates College (1863) (then called the Maine State Seminary) and Harvard Medical School (1867). After initially starting to practice in Durham, Maine, he shortly moved to Lewiston where he became a partner of Alonzo Garcelon, a future governor and developed an active surgery practice. Seeing a need for an emergency room in the Lewiston and Auburn area, in 1871 Hill published an article advocating for a public hospital. After the city failed to act for several years, Hill purchased a house and land for a hospital himself and transferred it to the hospital corporation. The legislature finally provided support in 1888, thereby officially creating Central Maine Hospital (later renamed Central Maine Medical Center). Hill was an active member of the Maine Medical Society where he presented a well known paper on “Perineal Urethrotomy” in 1885. After severe suffering from arthritis for over a decade, he died on July 17 1904 and was buried in Lewiston's Riverside Cemetery. In 1872 Hill married Charlotte C. Thompson, and they had two children.
