= Maine Supply Company Building =

- U.S. National Register of Historic Places
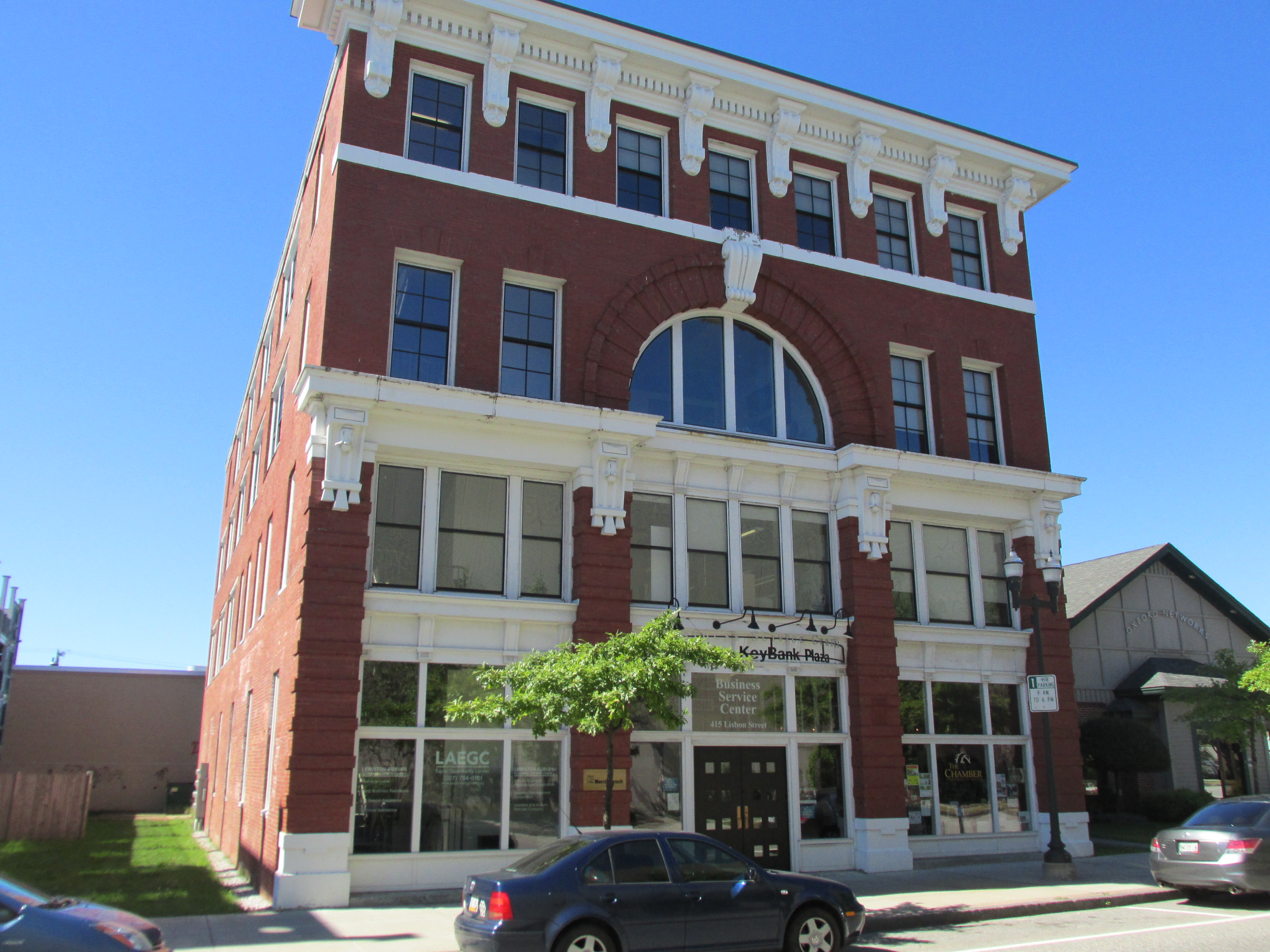
- Maine Supply Company Building

- Location within Maine Location within the United States
- Location: Lewiston, Maine
- Coordinates: 44°5′30″N 70°12′53″W
- Built: 1911
- Architect: Miller & Mayo
- Architectural style: Renaissance
- MPS: Lewiston Commercial District MRA
- NRHP reference No.: 86002286
- Added to NRHP: April 25, 1986

The Maine Supply Company Building is an historic commercial building at 415–417 Lisbon Street in Lewiston, Maine. Built in 1911, this Renaissance Revival building is the best-preserved local work of Miller & Mayo, and is also notable as housing the first known automotive service center in the state. The building was listed on the National Register of Historic Places in 1986.

== Description and history ==
The Maine Supply Company Building stands on the west side of lower Lisbon Street, Lewiston's principal commercial thoroughfare. It is a four-story masonry structure, built out of brick with wooden trim. Its facade is divided into three sections, articulated on the first two levels by quoined brick piers, topped in pairs by elaborate cornices. On the third level a massive round arch caps the central two piers. Bays within the arch and on the second level are occupied by bands of sash windows; the first floor has commercial plate glass windows in the outer sections, and a glassed entry in the center. The remaining bays are single sash, set in rectangular openings, which are keystoned on the third level and plain on the fourth. An elaborate cornice with large brackets and dentil moulding crowns the structure.

The building was built in 1911 for the Maine Supply Company, a retailer of agricultural implements. From 1919 to 1928 it housed an automobile sales showroom and service center, with garage service bays in a single-story addition (no longer standing) to the south. Two of the building's ground floor sections once housed garage bay doors to facilitate vehicular access. The building has since seen use as a warehouse and office building.

== See also ==
- National Register of Historic Places listings in Androscoggin County, Maine
