= Emery School =

- U.S. National Register of Historic Places
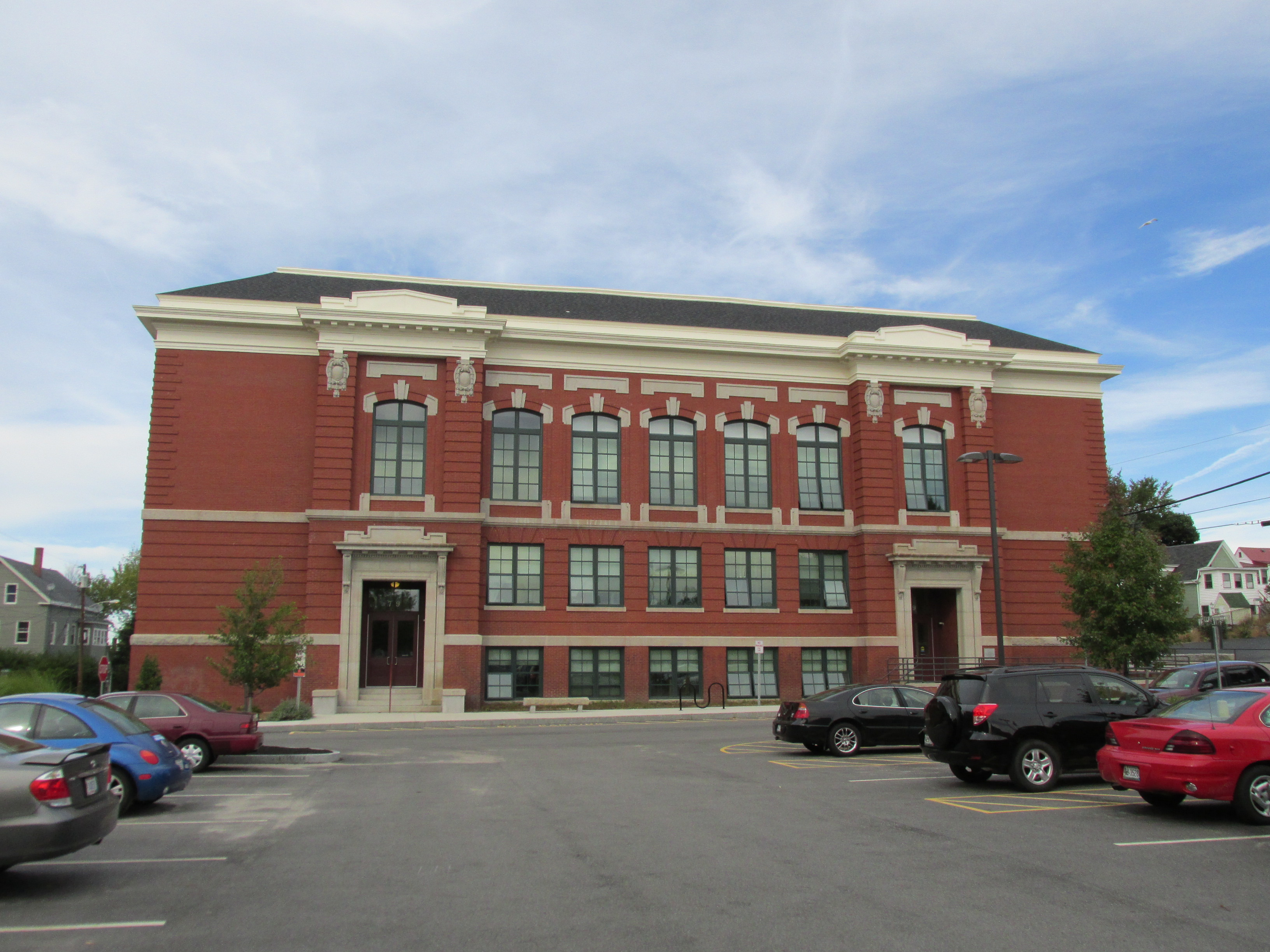

- Location within Maine Location within the United States
- Location: 116 Hill St. Biddeford, Maine
- Coordinates: 43°29′19″N 70°27′17″W
- Area: 1 acre (0.40 ha)
- Built: 1912
- Architect: Miller & Mayo
- NRHP reference No.: 11000819
- Added to NRHP: November 18, 2011

The Emery School is an historic former school building at 116 Hill Street in Biddeford, Maine. It was built between 1912 to 1913 in the Colonial Revival style by Portland-based firm Miller & Mayo.

It is historically significant for its role the city's education, and architecturally as a fine example of a "modern" elementary school building of the period. It was listed on the National Register of Historic Places on November 18, 2011. The building has been converted to residential housing units.

== Architectural description ==
The former Emery School building is located south of Biddeford's main business district, on a lot bounded by Hill, Birch, and Summer Streets. It is a two-story brick structure, trimmed in cast stone and granite, facing south toward Birch Street, separated by a paved parking area. The main facade is symmetrically arranged, nine bays wide, with two slightly-projecting entrance pavilions set one bay in from the ends.

These pavilions are framed by rusticated brick pilasters with a stone cartouche at the top of the second floor. The entrances are set in cast stone surrounds consisting of pilasters supporting a modillioned cornice supported by scrolled brackets. Belt courses of stone demarcate the floors, and the cornice of the main hipped roof is of pressed metal.

== History ==
The Emery School was built in 1912-13 as part of a drive by the city to modernize its school facilities. Designed in the Colonial Revival style by the Portland firm of Miller & Mayo, it adhered to guidelines published by the state in 1904 for the required properties of elementary school buildings, which included detailed prescriptions for the use of materials and layout and size of classrooms, and replaced four smaller elementary schools.

The school was used by the city until 1993, and served until 2007 as a childhood development center operated by a local Catholic church. The building has since been converted into residences.

== See also ==
- National Register of Historic Places listings in York County, Maine
