= Old Scarborough High School =

- Scarborough High School
- U.S. National Register of Historic Places
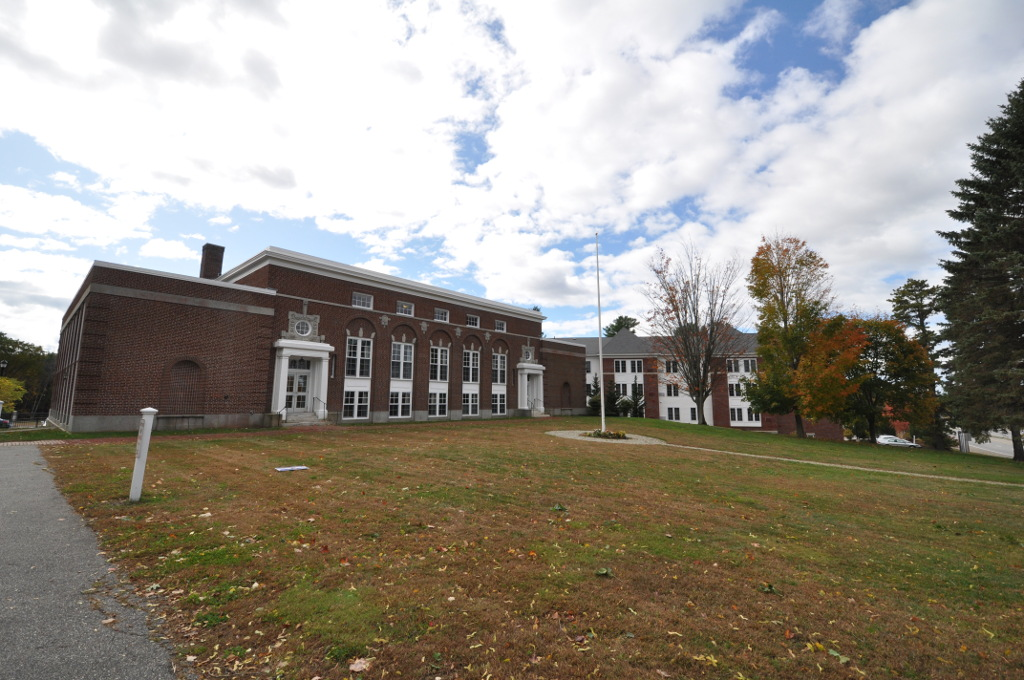
- The old high school is on the left, the new wing on the right

- Location within Maine Location within the United States
- Location: 272 US 1, Scarborough, Maine
- Coordinates: 43°35′19″N 70°20′28″W
- Area: 2 acres (0.81 ha)
- Built: 1926
- Architect: Miller, Mayo & Beal; Maloney, John J.
- Architectural style: Colonial Revival
- NRHP reference No.: 07000595
- Added to NRHP: June 27, 2007

The Old Scarborough High School is a historic former school building at 272 United States Route 1 in Scarborough, Maine. Built in 1926 as the town's first dedicated high school building, this Georgian Revival building is now part of Bessey Commons, an assisted living facility. It was listed on the National Register of Historic Places in 2007. The current Scarborough High School is located on Municipal Drive.

== Description and history ==
Scarborough's former high school building is located on the western edge of the town's central village, just east of the Maine Veterans' Home on the south side of US Route 1. It is a flat-roofed brick building, with a three-story central section flanked by two-story wings. A modern residential wing has been attached at its eastern end via a hyphen. The central section is seven bays wide, with entrances at the outer bays, flanked by square pilasters supporting an entablature. The entrances are topped on the second level by round windows. The middle bays are set in recessed round-arch sections, with windows at the basement and main floor levels separated by paneling. The third floor is separated from the others by a stone beltcourse, and has short windows in the middle five bays.

Scarborough's earliest high school classes were educated in facilities of the town hall, and were moved in 1905 to the upper floor of a new school building. Continued growth prompted the local decision to build a dedicated structure in the 1920s. This building was designed by the Portland architectural firm Miller, Mayo & Beal, and was completed in 1926. It served the town as its high school until 1954, when the current high school was opened. It was then converted into a junior high school, and named in honor of former high school principal Elwood Bessey. It served as a junior high school until 1961, and then as an elementary school until 2006. It has since been adapted as part of an assisted living facility.

== See also ==
- National Register of Historic Places listings in Cumberland County, Maine
