= Central Maine Medical Center =

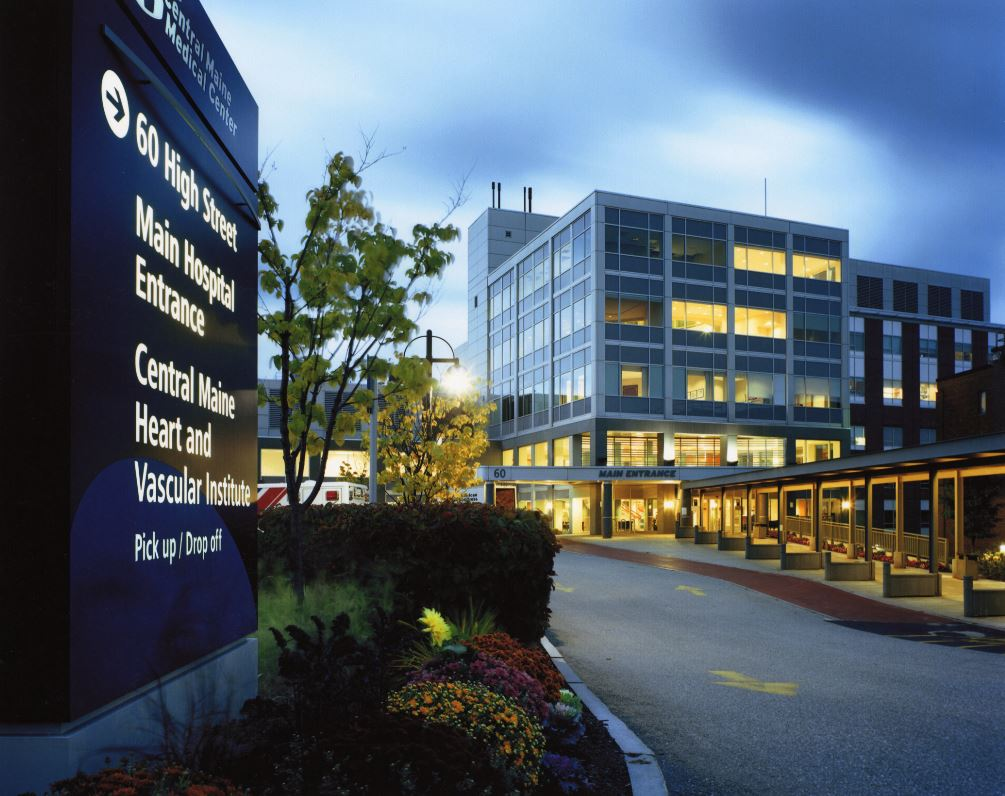
- Central Maine Medical Center, seen from High Street

- Shown in Maine

Geography
- Location: Lewiston, Maine, United States
- Coordinates: 44.101129°N 70.214395°W

Organization
- Affiliated university: Boston University School of Medicine; University of New England College of Osteopathic Medicine

Services
- Emergency department: Level II trauma center
- Beds: 250

History
- Founded: 1860s

Links
- Website: https://www.cmhc.org/
- Lists: Hospitals in Maine

The Central Maine Medical Center, formerly Central Maine General Hospital, is a hospital located at 300 Main Street in the city of Lewiston, Maine. It serves most of Androscoggin County, including Lewiston and Auburn, Maine and various small and medium-sized communities. It is designated as a trauma center. The hospital was established in the 1860s and officially incorporated in 1888 by Dr. Edward H. Hill, an alumnus of nearby Bates College and also Harvard Medical School. The hospital is currently a teaching affiliate of Boston University School of Medicine and University of New England College of Osteopathic Medicine.

== Services ==
CMMC is located downtown at High Street near Bates College. The hospital campus includes several large parking facilities, a helipad for LifeFlight of Maine. In recent years the hospital has created the Central Maine Heart and Vascular Institute and has approximately 250 beds, and approximately 300 physicians. Central Maine Healthcare runs two other hospitals, one in Bridgton and another in Rumford. It operates the Maine College of Health Professions and many affiliated long-term care facilities, clinics, and practices throughout central and western Maine. The current CEO of the hospital chain is Steve Littleson. CMMC recently underwent major renovations to their emergency department.

== Legal issues ==
Central Maine Medical Center and its parent organization, Central Maine Healthcare, have been involved in several notable legal matters, including class-action litigation related to data security, medical malpractice claims, contract disputes, and regulatory settlements.

=== Data security incidents and related litigation ===
Central Maine Healthcare has experienced multiple data security incidents. In 2022, a breach affected approximately 11,938 individuals.

In 2025, the organization suffered a more significant incident. An unauthorized party gained access to its IT environment between March 19, 2025, and June 1, 2025. The breach impacted approximately 145,000 individuals (including roughly 138,000 Maine residents), exposing names, dates of birth, treatment information, dates of service, provider names, health insurance information, and in some cases Social Security numbers.

By July 2025, at least six class-action lawsuits had been filed against Central Maine Healthcare, alleging negligence and breach of implied contract in connection with the 2025 data breach.

=== American Health Connection v. Central Maine Healthcare Corporation (2024) ===
In 2024, American Health Connection filed a lawsuit against Central Maine Healthcare Corporation (case number 2:24-cv-00298, U.S. District Court for the District of Maine). The case involves a diversity action for breach of contract.

=== Medical malpractice ===
In March 2026, Calyx Hemenway filed a medical malpractice lawsuit in Maine Superior Court against Central Maine Medical Center, Central Maine Healthcare, and two midwives. The suit alleges that hospital staff failed to adequately respond to the plaintiff's reports of pain and illness during pregnancy, resulting in her son being born in 2022 with severe cerebral palsy.

=== Other cases ===
- Levesque v. Central Maine Medical Center (2012): The Maine Supreme Judicial Court addressed whether claims against a hospital for the alleged negligence of a physician acting as an apparent agent require prelitigation screening under the Maine Health Security Act.
- Employment-related cases: These include Kezer v. Central Maine Medical Center (2012, employment discrimination) and a 2023 lawsuit by Motaz El Kelani alleging discrimination based on race, gender, national origin, and religion.
- Regulatory settlement: Central Maine Medical Center agreed to pay $16,000 to resolve allegations that it violated the Civil Monetary Penalties Law by employing an excluded individual.

== See also ==
- List of hospitals in Maine
