= Spring Harbor Hospital =

Behavioral Health at Spring Harbor

Geography
- Location: Westbrook, Maine, Portland metro area, Maine, United States
- Coordinates: 43°39′10″N 70°20′36″W

Organization
- Type: Psychiatric
- Affiliated university: MaineHealth Behavioral Health, MaineHealth

Services
- Beds: 100

History
- Opened: 1999

Links
- Website: https://mainehealth.org/spring-harbor-hospital
- Lists: Hospitals in Maine

Behavioral Health at Spring Harbor, formerly known as "Spring Harbor Hospital", is a 100-bed free-standing nonprofit psychiatric hospital located in Westbrook, Maine. It is one of two free standing psychiatric hospitals in the state of Maine and offers services for both children and adults.

== History ==
Spring Harbor came into being in 1999 when Maine Medical Center purchased a for-profit psychiatric hospital, Jackson Brook Institute. In 2007, a donation from philanthropist Al Glickman created the Glickman Family Center for Child and Adolescent Psychiatry, which helps to support programs for families at Spring Harbor. The hospital originally had 88 beds, and in 2016, 12 more beds were added to address the growing need for psychiatric services in Southern Maine.

== Services ==
Spring Harbor has 3 adult units totaling 60 beds. There is a child unit with 8 beds, and three adolescent units with a total of 32 beds. The units are named with respect to direction, 1NE, 1NW, etc. Behavioral Health at Spring Harbor is affiliated with MaineHealth Behavioral Health (MHBH), which is a division of MaineHealth, a non-profit healthcare organization in the state of Maine.
