= Northern Maine Medical Center =

- Shown in Maine

Geography
- Location: Fort Kent, Maine, United States
- Coordinates: 47.2656°N 68.5919°W

Links
- Website: http://www.nmmc.org
- Lists: Hospitals in Maine

The Northern Maine Medical Center is a hospital located in the town of Fort Kent, Maine. It serves most of Aroostook County, including more than ten small and medium-sized communities.

== See also ==
- List of hospitals in Maine
