= Professional Building (Waterville, Maine) =

- U.S. National Register of Historic Places
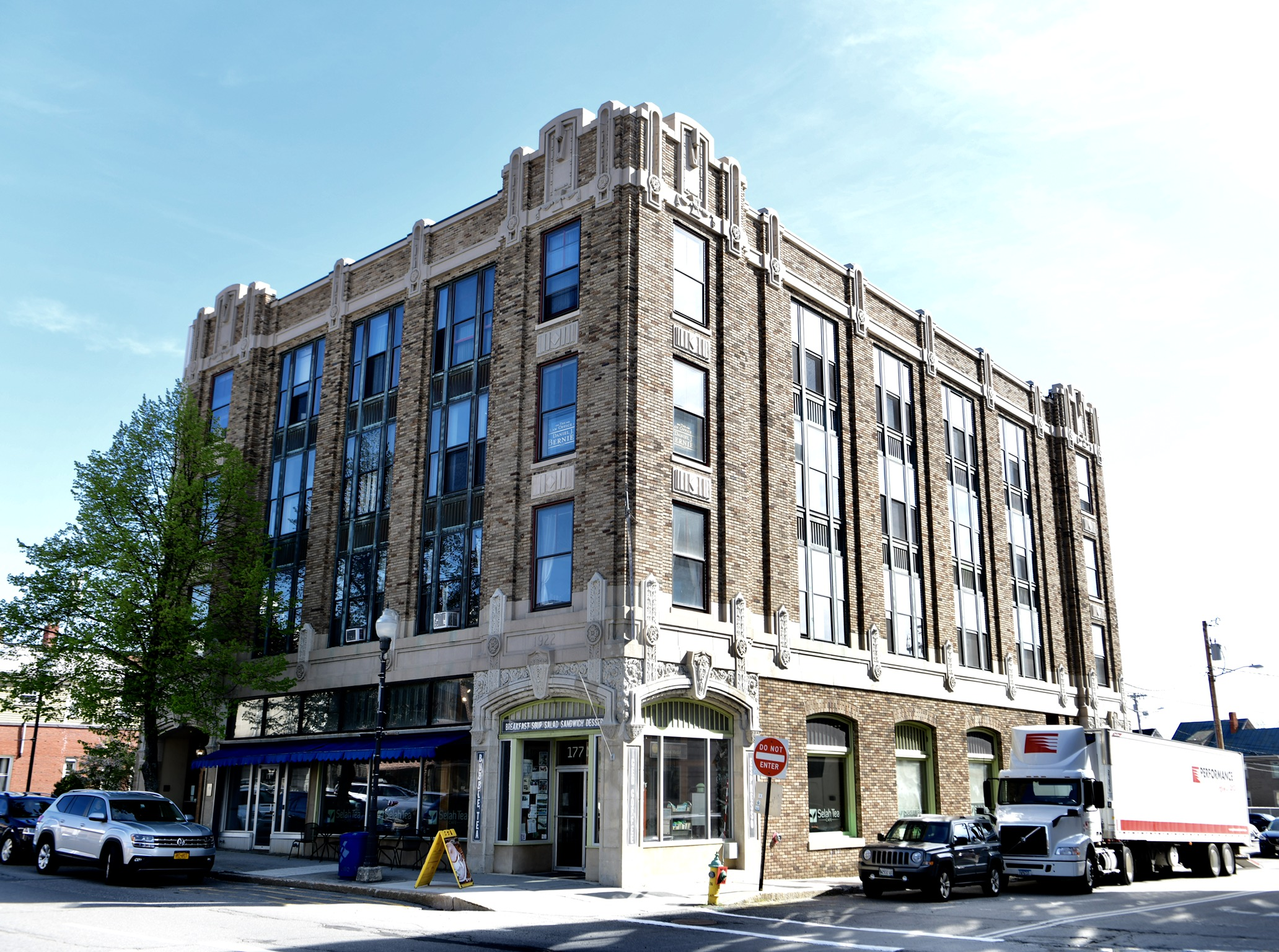

- Location within Maine Location within the United States
- Location: 177 and 179 Main St., Waterville, Maine
- Coordinates: 44°33′7″N 69°37′52″W
- Area: 0.3 acres (0.12 ha)
- Built: 1923
- Architect: Miller & Mayo
- Architectural style: Art Deco
- NRHP reference No.: 82000755
- Added to NRHP: February 19, 1982

The Professional Building is a historic commercial building at 177-179 Main Street in Waterville, Maine. Built in 1923 to a design by Miller & Mayo of Portland, it is a rare early example of Art Deco architecture in the state. It was listed on the National Register of Historic Places in 1982.

== Description and history ==
Waterville's Professional Building stands on the east side of Main Street in the city's downtown business district, at its northeast corner with Appleton Street. It is a four-story structure, with a steel frame clad in brick and concrete. Its main street facade is five bays wide, with the outer bays projecting slightly, giving the impression of towers. The outer bays on both street facades have entrances set in decorated segmented arch surrounds, and the entire first floor is topped by decorate concrete work. The top of the build has similar decorative elements, with raised parapets at the corners. Windows in the corner bays are standard sash, with decorative panels between, while inner bays have groups of three windows in a narrow-wide-narrow configuration. The bays are articulated by projecting brick piers, capped by decorative elements at the parapet above.

The building was designed by the noted Portland firm of Miller and Mayo, and was built in 1923. At the time of its construction, it was (with more than 30,000 square feet of prime commercial and office space) the largest building of its type in the city. Its architectural details also represent an unusually early example of Art Deco elements in the state.

== See also ==
- National Register of Historic Places listings in Kennebec County, Maine
