= Regina Cleri =

Home for retired priests in Massachusetts, United States

Coordinates: 42.3628°N 71.0658°W

Regina Cleri is a home for retired priests in the Archdiocese of Boston. It is located in Boston's West End near to Massachusetts General Hospital. It was established in December 1964 by Richard Cardinal Cushing to provide residences, health care, and support for senior priests of the Roman Catholic Archdiocese of Boston. The executive director of the facility is Stephen J. Gust.

As of 2014, 56 priests lived there and through its history to that point almost 400 had lived there. From 1964 until 1978, the Sisters of Bon Secours took care of the residence and the community. Since 1978, a group of Sister Disciples of the Divine Master work at the home. In 2024, there were 65 priests living in the residence and community.

On the baldacchino over the altar in the chapel at the residence, where the priest residents attend daily Mass as they are able, there is the inscription "Tu es Sacerdos in Aeternum" reminding them "You are a priest forever".

A number of priests from Regina Cleri still say Mass in churches outside the facility and give time to parishes in the Archdiocese.
