= Covenant Health Systems =

Covenant Health Systems is a non-profit Catholic regional health care system sponsoring hospitals, nursing homes, assisted living residences and other health and elder services throughout New England.

The company was established in 1983 by the Sisters of Charity of Montreal, known as the Grey Nuns, to direct, support and conduct their health care, elder care and social service systems throughout the United States. Today, Covenant Health Systems serves as sponsor, governance organization and manager of multiple health and elder care related organizations throughout New England. Covenant Health Systems is a Catholic health organization committed to advancing the healing ministry of Jesus.

== The Sisters of Charity of Montreal ==
In 1855 Toledo, Ohio was in the midst of a cholera and malaria epidemic. Father Augustine Campion, pastor of St. Francis de Sales Church, asked the Sisters of Charity of Montreal for assistance. They established St. Vincent Hospital.

In 1983 the Sisters of Charity of Montreal established the Grey Nuns Health System to direct, support and conduct their health care, elder care and social service systems throughout the United States. As other religious congregations expressed interest in joining the Grey Nuns Health System, in 1986 the Grey Nuns Health System name changed to Covenant Health Systems. St. Vincent's Medical Center in Toledo joined Catholic Health Partners, while Covenant Health Systems retained management of the facilities in New England. Covenant Health Systems sponsors "Covenant Health Inc."

- Mary Immaculate (MI) Health/Care Services, in Lawrence, MA is a member facility sponsored by the "Grey Nuns", as is
- St. Joseph Hospital, Nashua, NH
- *Youville House Assisted Living Residence, Cambridge, MA and
- Youville Place Assisted Living Residence, Lexington, MA are sponsored by the Sisters of Charity of Montreal, "Grey Nuns".
- *St. Mary Health Care Center, Worcester, MA was established by Covenant Health in 1998.
- St. Mary's Health System, Lewiston, ME sponsored by the Sisters of Charity of St. Hyacinthe, a separate branch of the Grey Nuns.

== Sponsored and member organizations ==
=== Poor Sisters of Jesus Crucified and the Sorrowful Mother (PSJCSM) ===
congregation was founded by Rev. Alphonsus Maria, C.P. on January 21, 1924, in the diocese of Scranton, Pennsylvania to provide assistance to the Lithuanian immigrants of the area. The Rule is based ono that of the Passionists. They minister in the areas of education and healthcare. in 1945, at the invitation of Archbishop Cushing of Boston, the motherhouse was moved to Brockton, Massachusetts. The sisters continue to staff and volunteer at St. Joseph Manor nursing home in Brockton. as well as Mater Dei Adult Day Care Center.

- St. Mary's Villa, Moscow, PA in sponsored by the Poor Sisters of Jesus Crucified and the Sorrowful Mother.
- St. Joseph's Manor, Brockton, Massachusetts is sponsored by Covenant.

=== Other sponsors and members ===
- Fanny Allen Hospital, Colchester, VT -Sponsored by the Religious Hospitallers of St. Joseph. Fanny Allen Hospital merged with Mary Fletcher Hospital to become Fletcher Allen Health Care, now part of the University of Vermont Medical Center.
- Maristhill Nursing & Rehabilitation Center, Waltham, MA -Sponsored by the Missionary Sisters of the Society of Mary
- St. Andre Health Care Facility, Biddeford, ME -Sponsored by the Servants of the Immaculate Heart of Mary, "Good Shepherd Sisters of Quebec"
- St. Joseph Healthcare, Bangor, ME - In July 2010 the Sisters of St. Felix of Cantalice, sponsors of St. Joseph Hospital since 1947, officially transferred sponsorship to Covenant Health.

== Managed organizations and their sponsors ==
- Bangor Nursing and Rehabilitation Center, Bangor, ME
- Campion Health and Wellness Center, Weston, MA -Sponsored by The Society of Jesus (Jesuits)
- Holy Cross Health Center/St. George Manor, Manchester, NH -Sponsored by the Sisters of Holy Cross
- Penacook Place, Haverhill, MA
- Regina Cleri, Boston, MA -Elderly housing for the retired priests of the Archdiocese of Boston
- Salemhaven, Inc., Salem, NH

== Affiliated organizations and their sponsors ==
- Bethany Health Care Center, Framingham, MA
  - Sponsored by the Sisters of St. Joseph of Boston
- Elizabeth Seton Residence, Wellesley Hills, MA
  - Sponsored by the Sisters of Charity - Halifax
- Fall River Jewish Home, Fall River, MA
- Marillac Residence, Wellesley, MA
  - Sponsored by the Sisters of Charity - Halifax
- Notre Dame du Lac Assisted Living Residence, Worcester, MA
  - Sponsored by the Sisters of Notre Dame de Namur
- Notre Dame Long Term Care Center, Worcester, MA
  - Sponsored by the Sisters of Notre Dame de Namur
- Sancta Maria Nursing Facility, Cambridge, MA -Sponsored by the Daughters of Mary of the Immaculate Conception
