= Mid Coast Hospital =

Coordinates: 43.906002°N 69.891329°W

Geography
- Location: Brunswick, Maine, Mid Coast, Maine, United States

Organization
- Type: General (Full-Service, Independent, Community)

Services
- Beds: 93

History
- Founded: 1991

Links
- Lists: Hospitals in Maine

Mid Coast Hospital is located in Brunswick, Maine. It serves Maine's Midcoast region. The 93-bed facility is an independent, non-profit hospital governed by a community board of directors. Its current president and CEO is Lois Skillings, RN.

Mid Coast Hospital was formed after a merger occurred between Bath Memorial Hospital and Regional Memorial Hospital. The hospital opened its modern campus in Cook's Corner in 2001 and then expanded in 2009 with a new emergency department and additional medical/surgical inpatient beds.

Mid Coast Hospital is part of Mid Coast–Parkview Health, the third-largest employer in the Midcoast region with more than 2,000 employees.
