= Maine Medical Center =

- MMC

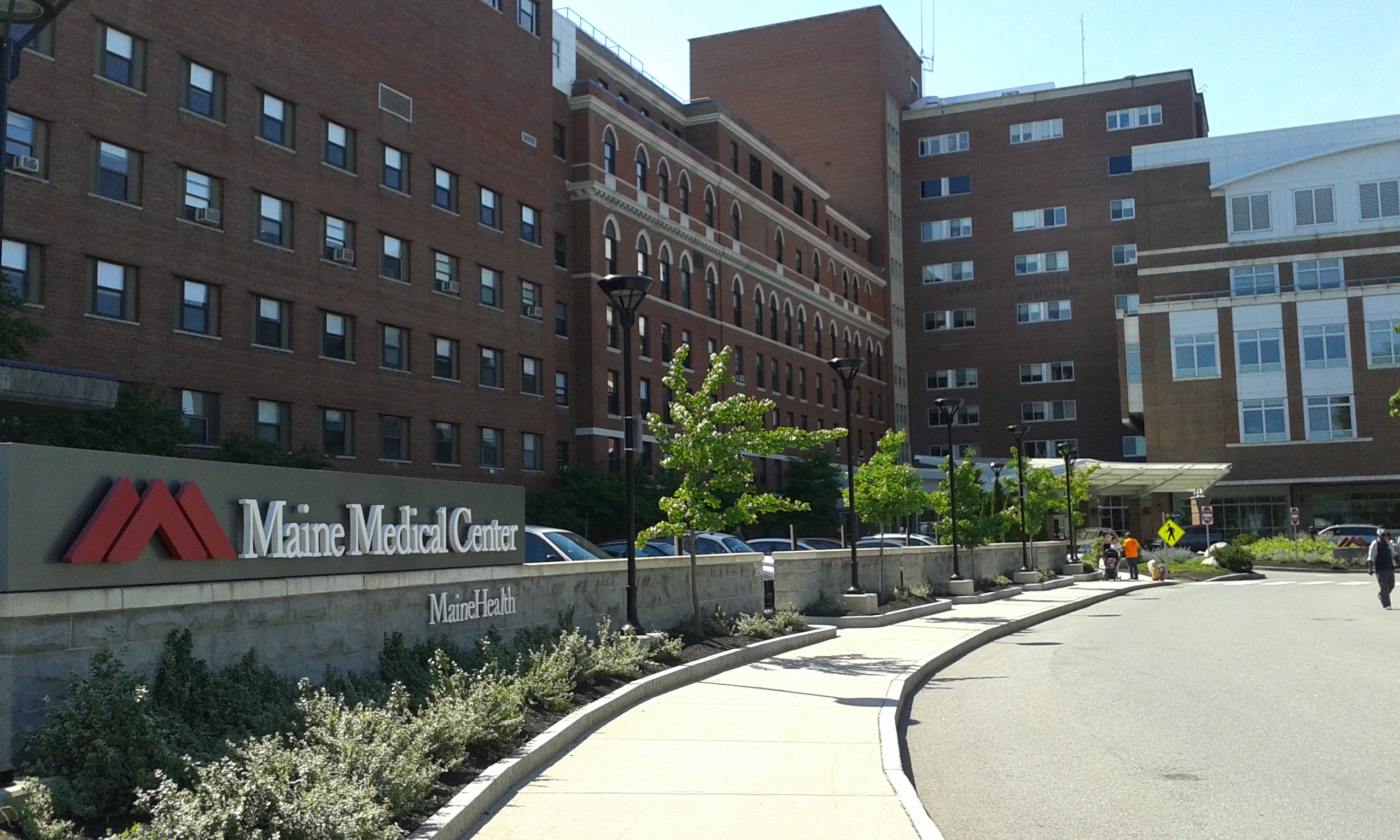
- Main hospital entrance

Geography
- Location: 22 Bramhall Street, Portland, Maine, United States
- Coordinates: 43°39′11″N 70°16′34″W

Organization
- Type: Non profit and Teaching
- Affiliated university: Tufts University School of Medicine

Services
- Emergency department: Level I trauma center
- Beds: 929

History
- Founded: 1874

Links
- Website: https://www.mainehealth.org/maine-medical-center
- Lists: Hospitals in Maine

MaineHealth Maine Medical Center Portland (MMCP), commonly contracted to Maine Med, is a 929-licensed-bed teaching hospital in Portland, Maine, United States. Affiliated with Tufts University School of Medicine, it is located in the Western Promenade neighborhood. It has a staff of over 6,000. The facility is one of only three Level I Trauma Centers in Northern New England. Founded in 1874, it is the largest hospital in northern New England with 28,000 inpatient visits, about 500,000 outpatient visits, 88,000 emergency visits, and over 27,000 surgeries performed annually. MMCP is structured as a non-profit, private corporation governed by volunteer trustees. Maine Medical Center Portland is wholly owned by, and serves as the flagship hospital for MaineHealth, a non-profit healthcare network servicing Maine and New Hampshire.

== History ==
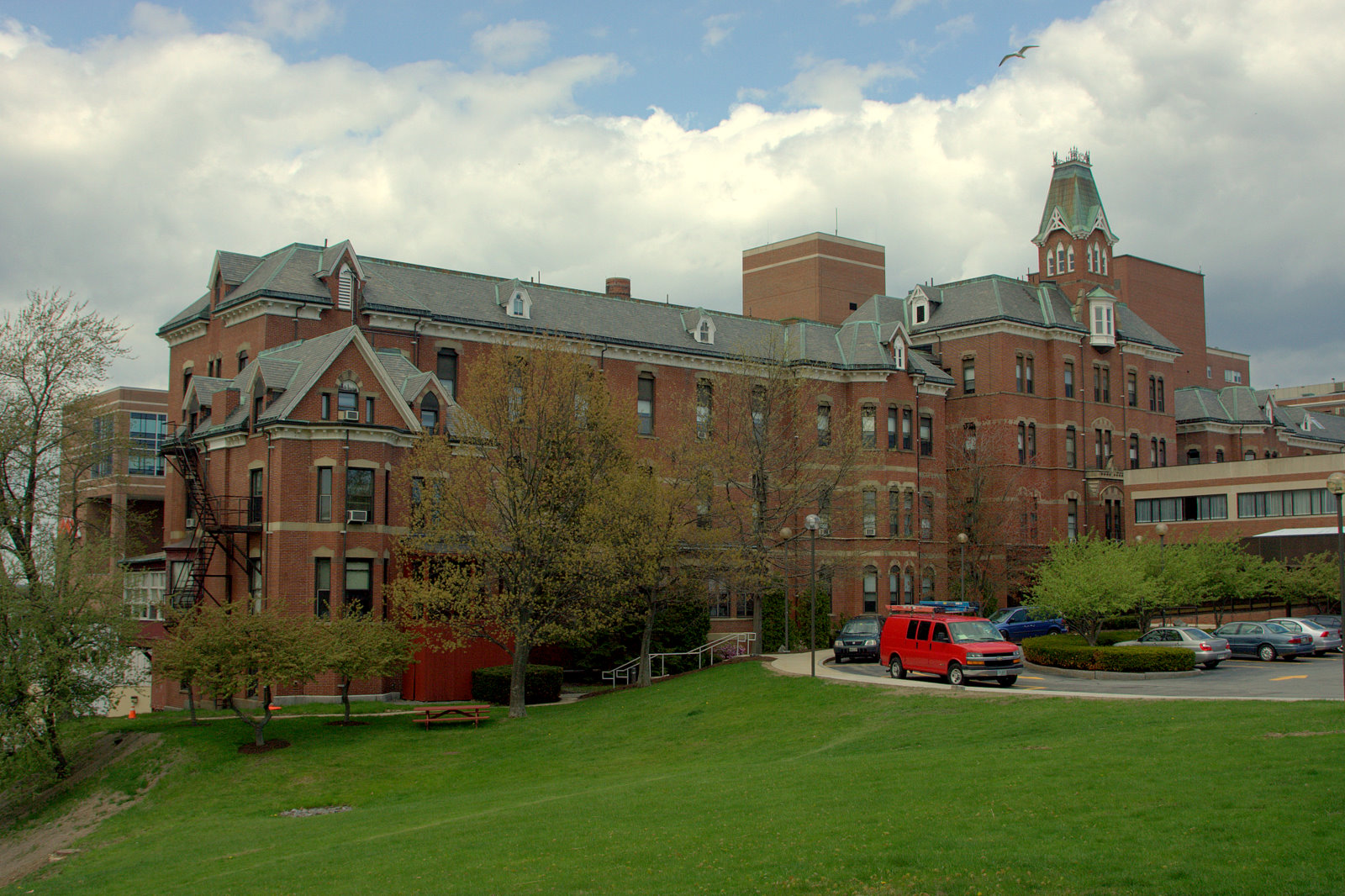
The original hospital building on the campus.

Maine Medical Center is the largest tertiary care hospital in Northern New England, serving all of Maine and parts of Vermont and New Hampshire. It is a Level I Trauma Center, previously named by U.S. News & World Report as one of the top hospitals in America for heart care, orthopedics and gynecology, and home to the Barbara Bush Children's Hospital, cited as one of the Top 25 children's hospitals in the country.

Maine Medical Center is a teaching hospital, with an affiliation with the University of Southern Maine, Saint Joseph's College, Tufts University and Dartmouth College. As a part of its mission, MMC is also a leader in biomedical research, through its Maine Medical Center Research Institute, ongoing clinical trials, and translational research.

== Maine Medical Center Research Institute ==
Since 1956, Maine Medical Center has recruited NIH-funded scientists to staff its research institute. The facility is subdivided into the centers for molecular medicine, clinical and translational research, outcomes research and evaluation, psychiatric research, and Lyme and vector-borne diseases. The institute also participates in multiple national and international clinical trials in fields ranging from cardiology to oncology, offering opportunities for graduate and post-doctoral training as well as funding.

Currently, Maine Medical Center Research Institute is one of 126 NIH-designated "Centers for Research Excellence" receiving funding for stem and progenitor cell biology and regenerative medicine.

== Governance ==
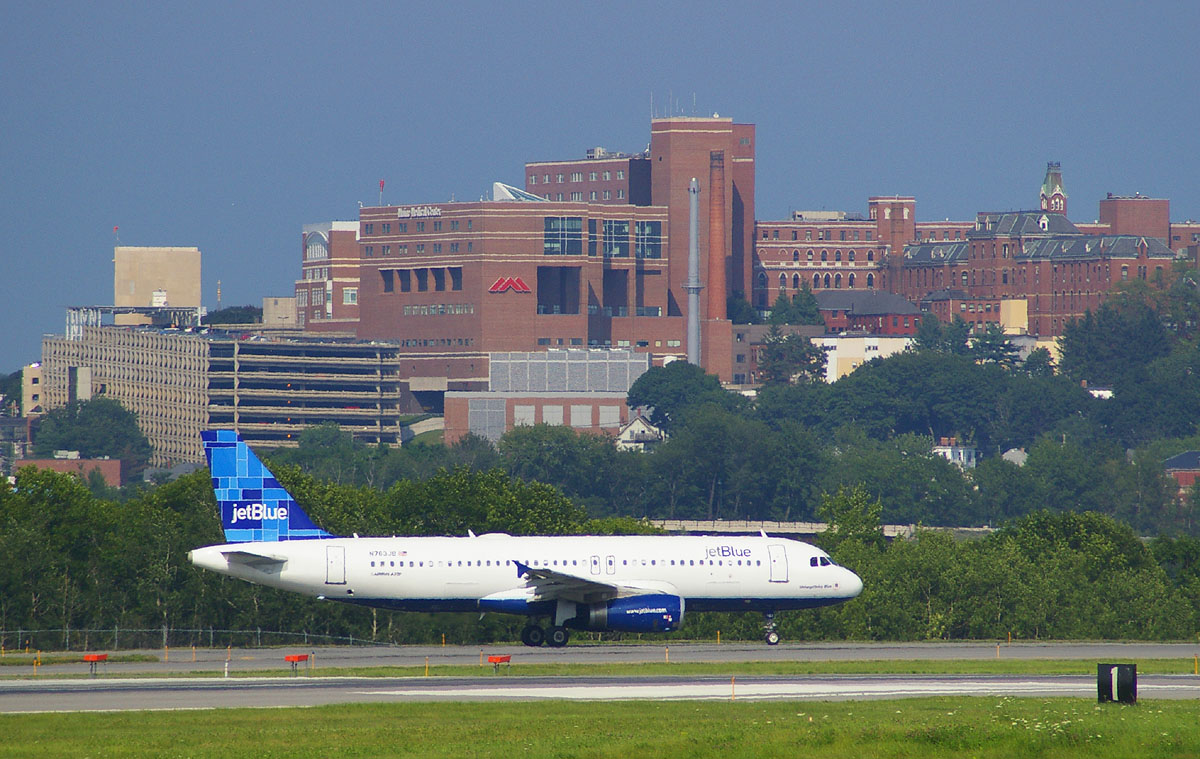
MMC as seen from the South Portland side of the Portland International Jetport

Maine Medical Center is owned by MaineHealth, the state's largest healthcare organization. MaineHealth formed in the late 1990s from MMC, with its first board of directors serving from 1999 to 2000. MaineHealth owns and operates a series of mental, long-term, primary care, emergency, and home healthcare facilities in southern, central, and western Maine. Other MaineHealth companies include Memorial Hospital (North Conway, New Hampshire), Western Maine Health, Penbay Medical Center, Waldo County General Hospital, Southern Maine Health Care (Biddeford and Sanford), LincolnHealth, Spring Harbor Hospital and HomeHealth-VNSM.

== Barbara Bush Children's Hospital ==
Referred to as a "hospital within a hospital", the Barbara Bush Children's Hospital (BBCH) is integrated within Maine Medical Center to offer a complete range of pediatric services, specialties and programs including behavioral and developmental, neonatal, cardiology, infectious disease, neurology, palliative care and otolaryngology, among others. The original Children's Hospital opened in 1908, later merging with the Maine Eye and Ear Infirmary (opened in 1890) and the Maine General Hospital (opened in 1874) to become Maine Medical Center. In 1998, the facility sought formal accreditation for its children's services as the Barbara Bush Children's Hospital at Maine Medical Center. The hospital treats infants, children, teens, and young adults aged 0–21 throughout Maine.

The inpatient unit of BBCH is approximately 26,000 square feet (2,400 m^{2}) with 109 beds including a 31-bed Neonatal Intensive Care Unit (NICU) and a 20-bed continuing care nursery.

== Specialty programs and care centers ==
- Barbara Bush Children's Hospital
- Joint Replacement Center
- Family Birth Center
- Cancer Institute
- Digestive Health Center
- Poison Center
- Scarborough Surgery Center
- MaineHealth VitalNetwork
- Maine Transplant Program

== Affiliations ==
Maine Medical Center is a teaching hospital, currently primarily affiliated with the Maine Track program at Tufts University School of Medicine. This program allows students from Maine, or those interested in practicing there, to complete the second through fourth year of medical school at MMC in Portland rather than Boston. MMC also hosts a small number of third year clerkships for students from the University of New England College of Osteopathic Medicine.
