= Belfast Historic District =

Historic district in Maine, United States

- U.S. National Register of Historic Places
- U.S. Historic district
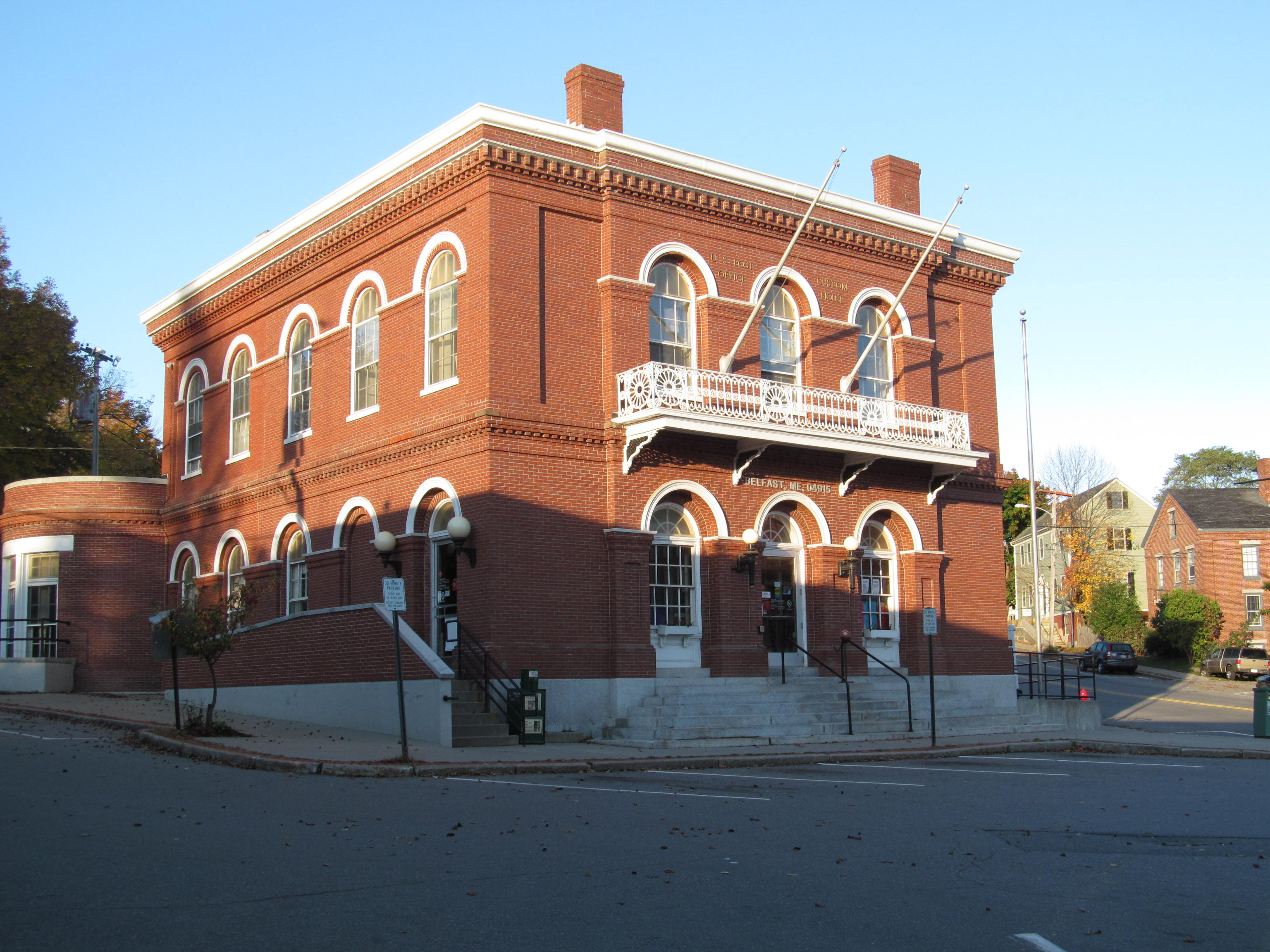
- The former Post Office and Custom House building

- Location within Maine Location within the United States
- Location: Roughly bounded by High, Grove and Elm, Congress, Main and Market and Imrose, Belfast, Maine
- Coordinates: 44°25′25″N 69°0′23″W
- Area: 126 acres (51 ha); 2 acres (0.81 ha) (1993 increase) less than one acre (1995 increase)
- Architect: Calvin Ryder, et al.
- Architectural style: Greek Revival, Italianate, Federal
- NRHP reference No.: 86002733 (original); 93000195 (increase 1); 95001476 (increase 2)

Significant dates
- Added to NRHP: August 21, 1986
- Boundary increases: April 2, 1993; December 28, 1995

The Belfast Historic District encompasses a large portion of the city center of Belfast, Maine, representing one of Maine's largest concentrations of pre-Civil War architecture, as well as a rich collection of commercial architecture of the late 19th and early 20th centuries. The district was listed on the National Register of Historic Places in 1986, with minor enlargements in 1993 and 1995.

== Description and history ==
The city of Belfast is located at the head of Belfast Bay on the west side of Penobscot Bay, where the Passagassawakeag River empties into the bay. Incorporated as a city in 1853, it was by then a major shipbuilding and shipping center. In the second half of the 19th century it was served by steamship service to other ports, and was connected by railroad to Boston and Portland. The city has also been the county seat of Waldo County since its founding in 1827.

The city's downtown is organized as a series of roads paralleling the southern bank of the river, which is oriented roughly northwest to southeast. This historic district encompasses a large portion of this area, roughly bounded on the north by Anderson and High Streets, on the east by High Street, on the south by Elm and Grove Streets, and on the west by Congress Street. This area includes one of the state's largest single concentrations of residential architecture from the first half of the 19th century, and a significant collection of commercial and municipal architecture extending from then into the mid-20th century.

The commercial focus of the city is at a five-way intersection involving Main, Church, and Beaver Streets. The area extending from this point northward along Main Street contains a concentration of the city's finest late 19th-century commercial architecture, which is separately listed on the National Register as the Belfast Commercial Historic District, and includes as prominent landmarks the Belfast National Bank building and the former Masonic Temple. It also includes major civic buildings: City Hall, the Waldo County Courthouse, and the Customhouse and Post Office, all built in the 1850s and designed by prominent architects.

Extending south from this five-way intersection is Church Street, which is lined with a series of high-quality houses built primarily between 1840 and 1870. Stylistically they are typically Greek Revival or Italianate; the finest examples include the 1842 Greek Revival James P. White House, designed by Calvin Ryder, a local architect who left a significant imprint in the city. The northern end of Church Street is anchored by the 1818 First Church of Belfast, a fine Federal-period building.

After the district was listed on the National Register in 1986, it was technically amended in 1993 to include three properties on Anderson Street, which had been omitted due to unclear boundaries of the Primrose Hill Historic District, which this district was intended to completely include. In 1996 the Colonial Theater at 121 High Street was added; it is a Colonial Revival structure built in 1923 and restyled in 1947 into the Moderne style, illustrating the continuing evolution of the city's architecture.

== See also ==
- National Register of Historic Places listings in Waldo County, Maine
