= Union School (Searsport, Maine) =

- U.S. National Register of Historic Places
- Location within Maine Location within the United States
- Nearest city: Mt. Ephraim Rd. E side, 0.2 mi. N of jct. with US 1, Searsport, Maine
- Coordinates: 44.46089°N 68.92787°W
- Area: 1 acre (0.40 ha)
- Built: 1866
- Architect: George M. Harding
- Architectural style: Italianate
- NRHP reference No.: 93000203
- Added to NRHP: March 25, 1993

The Union School is a historic former school building on Mt. Ephraim Road in Searsport, Maine. Built in 1866, it is one of the town's prominent former public buildings, and an important surviving school commission of architect George M. Harding. It was listed on the National Register of Historic Places in 1993. It has been converted into apartments.

== Description and history ==
The former Union School building stands just outside the main downtown area of Searsport, on the east side of Mt. Ephraim Road, about 0.2 miles (0.32 km) north of its junction with United States Route 1. It is a two-story brick structure with a side gable roof and granite foundation. It is oriented facing south, with a five-bay facade that has a central entrance sheltered by a porch supported by narrow turned columns. Sash windows are set in rectangular openings, with stone sills and lintels, and there is a mansarded gable at the center of the roof above the entrance. The side elevations have fully pedimented and bracketed gables, with round-arch Italianate windows at their centers. These are partially obscured on the street-facing west side by a modern fire escape.

The school was completed in 1866, to a design by Portland architect George M. Harding, one of Maine's leading mid-19th-century architects. It is one of eight known school commissions of his, and is of those the best preserved (at least two have been demolished). (Harding is also credited with the design of Union Hall, Searsport's town hall.) The building was used as a school until 1953. Since its listing on the National Register in 1993, it has been converted to residential use.

== See also ==
- National Register of Historic Places listings in Waldo County, Maine
