= Lovell Meeting House =

- U.S. National Register of Historic Places
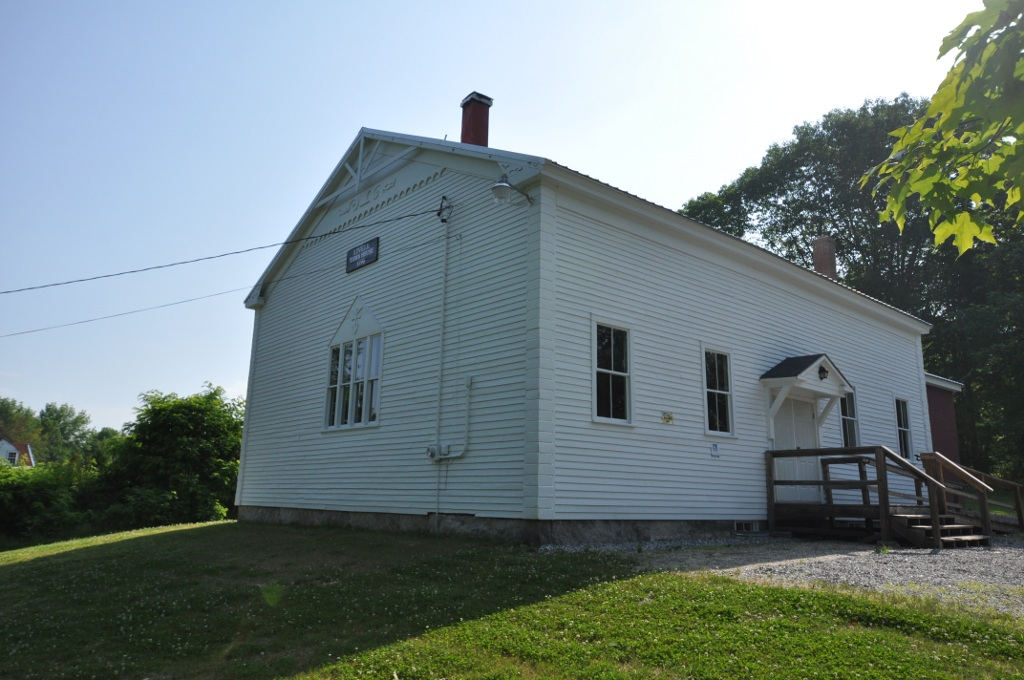

- Location within Maine Location within the United States
- Location: 1133 Main St., Lovell, Maine
- Coordinates: 44°11′3″N 70°53′25″W
- Area: 1.5 acres (0.61 ha)
- Built: 1796
- Architectural style: Georgian; Stick style
- NRHP reference No.: 14000360
- Added to NRHP: June 27, 2014

The Lovell Meeting House is a historic meeting house at 1133 Main Street (Maine State Route 5) in Lovell, Maine. Built in 1796, it served as Lovell's town hall and as a religious meeting place until 1852, when the Lovell Village Church was built. From then it has served strictly civic functions, and is still the location of Lovell's town meetings and voting. It was listed on the National Register of Historic Places in 2014.

== Description and history ==
The meeting house is a single story wood frame structure, with a gable roof, and resting on a modern concrete foundation capped in granite. It occupies part of a larger lot in the village of Center Lovell, which also includes the town's traditional parade ground. The building is 34 feet (10 m) wide and 46 feet (14 m) long. The main facade faces south (not toward the street, and is five bays wide. The center bay houses the entry, which is sheltered by a small gabled hood supported by simple wooden brackets, and is reached by three wooden steps. The entry is flanked by two sash windows on each side. The building has simple wood-block quoining at the corners. The street-facing (western) facade has a centered group of four narrow one-over-one sash windows, above which is a decorated wooden triangular panel. The gable peak is adorned with Stick style wooden truss elements, behind which flushboarding finishes the wall, which is otherwise clapboarded.

The interior of the building is a single large open space, with a raised platform stage at the eastern end, with seating in the remainder of the space. The stage is accessed by stairs at either end, with railings that have turned balusters. A beam extends across the space aligned with the front of the stage, and the otherwise open attic area is partitioned, creating the effect of a proscenium arch. The town's voting equipment is normally placed on the stage, and there is a wood stove at the southeast corner, where the door to the town vault is also located. The roof is supported by a series of open modified King post trusses. The walls are finished in pine wainscoting up to the windows, with an early form of gypsum board above.

The town of Lovell was settled in 1788. When the town built the meeting house in 1796-98, it had two stories, providing a gallery space on the second level. It is believed that it had, on the eastern wall, a traditional colonial-era pulpit board and elevated pulpit, and the floor was filled with box pews, although much of this work was not completed until c. 1820. Complaints about the draftiness of the building prompted a decision in 1819 to lower the ceiling, and it was apparently lowered again in 1827. The building was used for both civic and religious purposes until 1852, when the church congregation moved to the newly built Lovell Village Church. Some of the religious elements of the interior remained behind, however, and were only removed during alterations in 1890. Around 1920 the town authorized further changes to facilitate the staging of theatrical productions.

The town's offices are located in a modern building elsewhere in Center Lovell. This building continues to be used for town meetings and as a polling place.

== See also ==
- National Register of Historic Places listings in Oxford County, Maine
