= Belfast Commercial Historic District =

Historic district in Maine, United States

- U.S. National Register of Historic Places
- U.S. Historic district
- U.S. Historic district – Contributing property
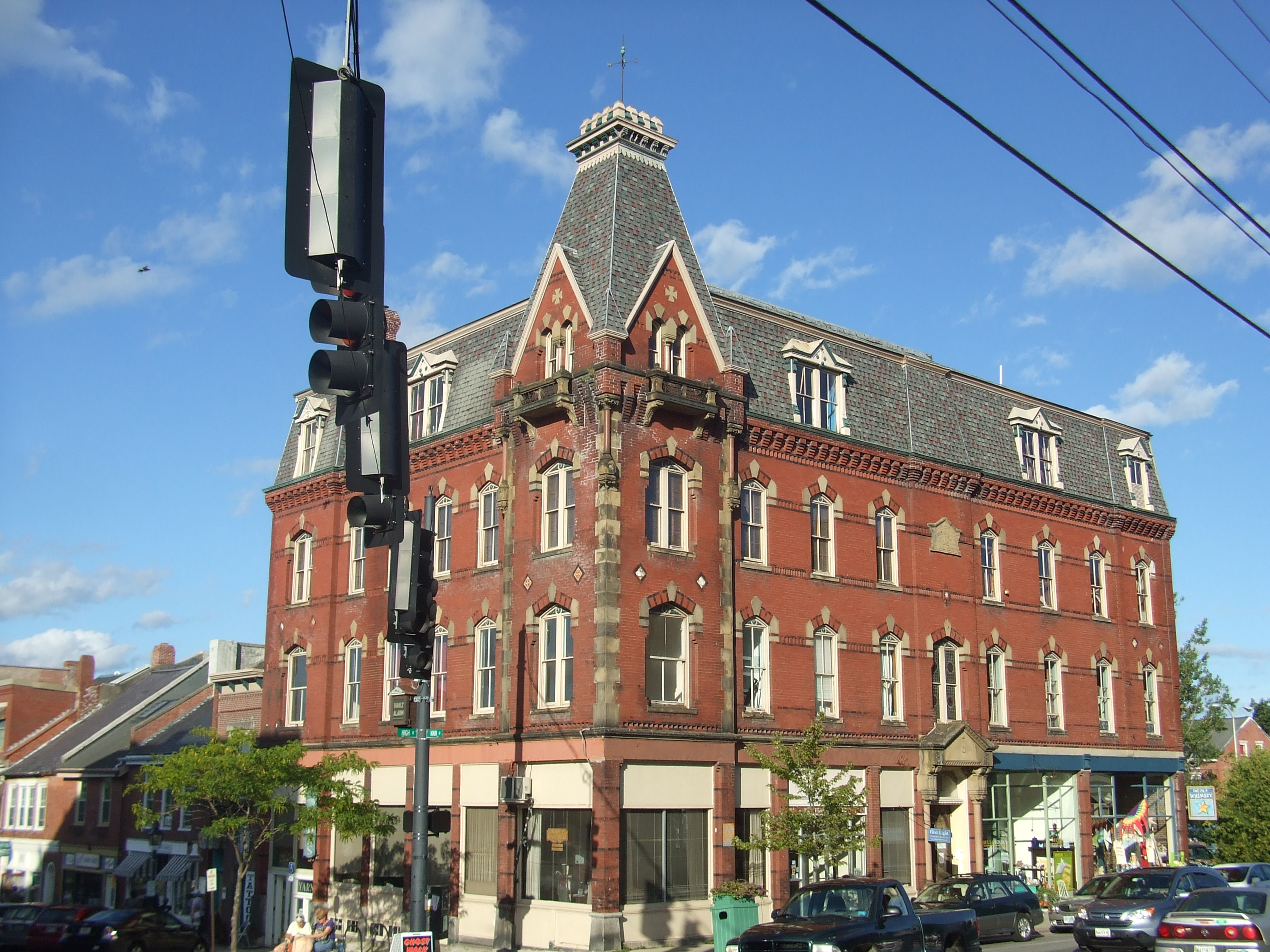
- The Masonic Temple

- Location within Maine Location within the United States
- Location: Main St. between Church and Cross Sts., Belfast, Maine
- Coordinates: 44°25′34″N 69°0′27″W
- Area: 6 acres (2.4 ha)
- Architect: Multiple
- Architectural style: Greek Revival, Italianate
- Part of: Belfast Historic District (ID86002733)
- NRHP reference No.: 80000257

Significant dates
- Added to NRHP: April 4, 1980
- Designated CP: August 21, 1986

The Belfast Commercial Historic District encompasses two blocks of the central business district of Belfast, Maine. This area includes the best-preserved and most architecturally interesting commercial buildings of the city's mid-to-late 19th century development, when it was the leading port on Penobscot Bay. It extends along Main Street from the major intersection and Church Street north to Washington Street. It was listed on the National Register of Historic Places in 1980, and is entirely contained within the larger Belfast Historic District.

== Description and history ==
The city of Belfast is located at the head of Belfast Bay on the west side of Penobscot Bay, where the Passagassawakeag River empties into the bay. Incorporated as a city in 1853, it was by then a major shipbuilding and shipping center. In the second half of the 19th century it was served by steamship service to other ports, and was connected by railroad to Boston and Portland. The city has also been the county seat of Waldo County since its founding in 1827.

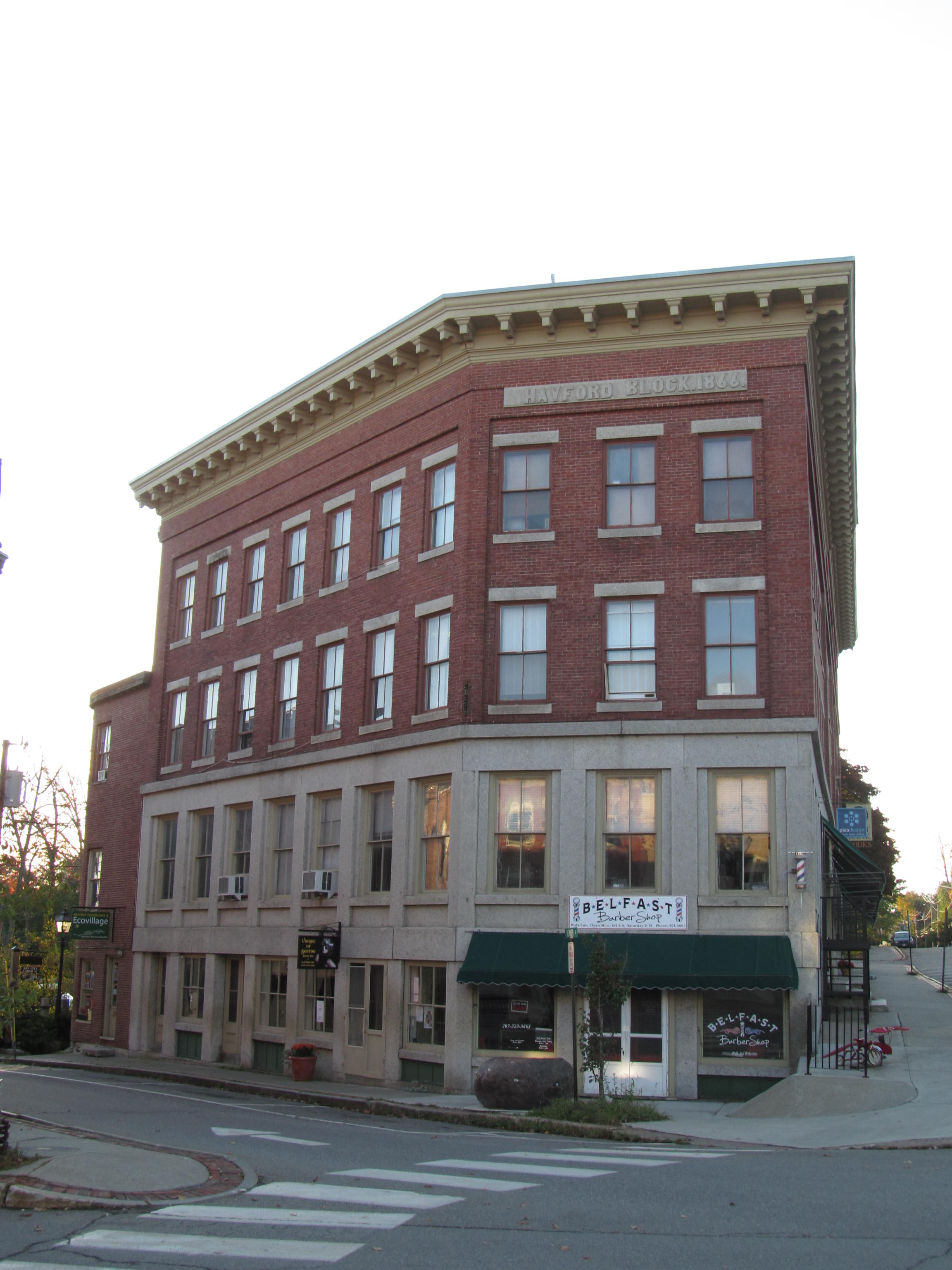
Hayford Block, Belfast, Maine

The city's downtown is organized as a series of roads paralleling the southern bank of the river, which is oriented roughly northwest to southeast. Main Street initial runs perpendicular to those roads, running southwest to a five-road interchange at Church and Beaver Streets, where it bends west. The two blocks north of this latter intersection are contained within the historic district, which includes 47 buildings on those two blocks and immediately adjacent side streets. Most of these buildings were built after fires that affected the entire downtown area in 1865 and 1873, although some older buildings have survived. Notable early buildings include the Waldo County Courthouse (1853) and City Block (1850), both designed by Bangor architect Benjamin S. Deane, and the 1855 Customhouse and Post Office, designed by Ammi B. Young. The Hayford Block, containing the Opera House, built in 1866 and 1868, is transitional Greek Revival-Italianate.

Notable later buildings include the Masonic Temple, which occupies a prominent position on the Church Street intersection, and the Belfast National Bank, both built in the late 1870s to designs by George M. Harding of Portland.

== See also ==
- National Register of Historic Places listings in Waldo County, Maine
