= Deering Street Historic District =

Historic district in Maine, United States

- U.S. National Register of Historic Places
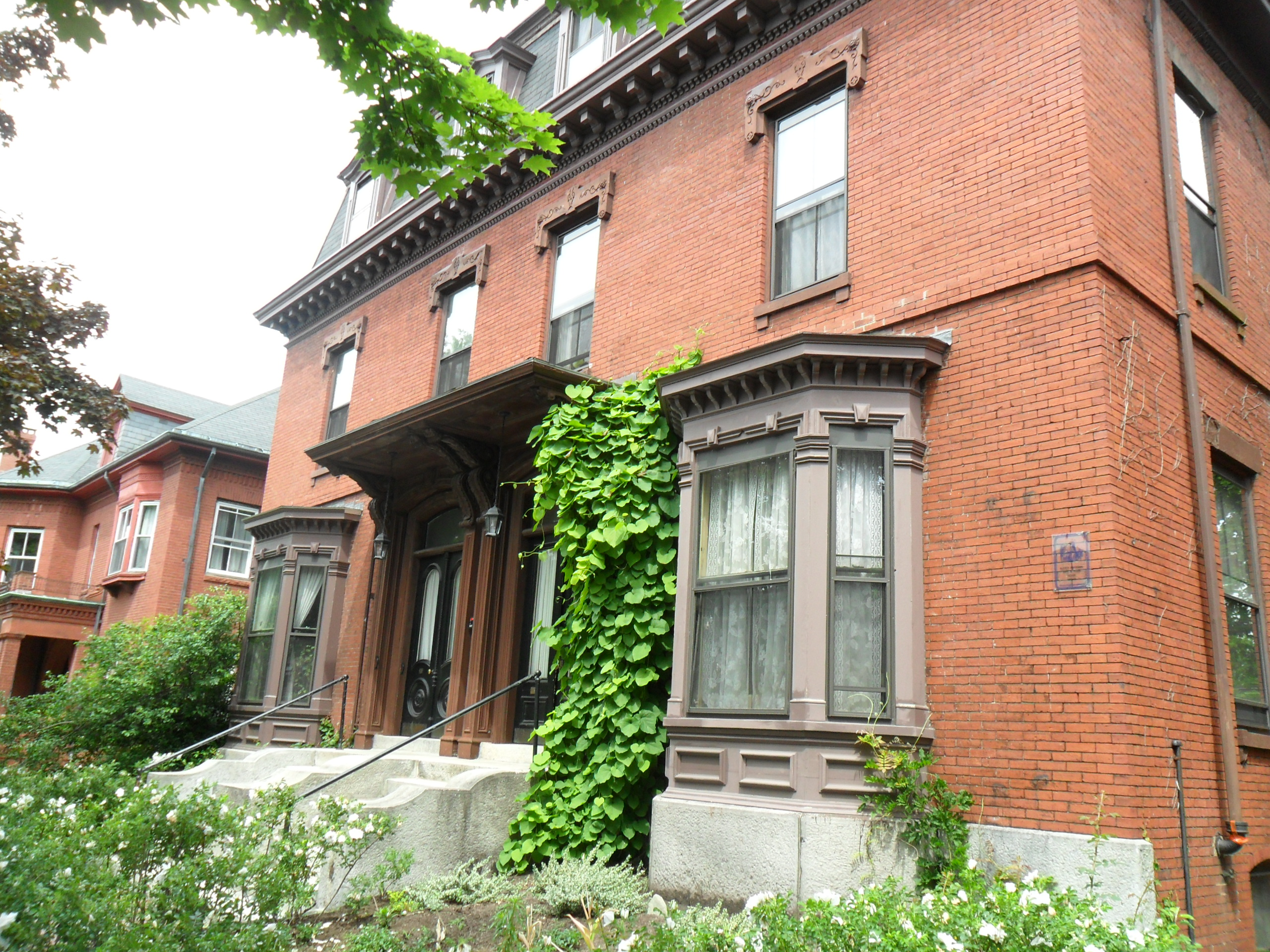
- A house on Deering Street in the Deering Street Historic District

- Location within Maine Location within the United States
- Location: Congress Street, Deering Street, Mellen Street and State Street, Portland, Maine
- Coordinates: 43°39′17″N 70°16′7″W
- Area: 21 acres (8.5 ha)
- Architectural style: Italianate, Greek Revival
- NRHP reference No.: 83000448
- Added to NRHP: January 27, 1983

The Deering Street Historic District is a historic district in the Downtown and Parkside neighborhoods of Portland, Maine. Encompassing all of Deering Street and much of State Street, as well as adjacent portions of Congress and Mellen Streets, it is a cohesive collection of high quality architect-designed buildings from the second half of the 19th century, that were originally predominantly residential in nature. The district was added to the National Register of Historic Places in 1983.

== Description and history ==
Deering Street is a short two-block street running parallel to Congress Street, the principal east–west street in downtown Portland. It is bisected by State Street, a major road which provides access to Congress Street from points north. At Deering Street's western end is Mellen Street. The historic district includes the entire length of Deering Street, all of State Street from Congress Street to Deering Oaks, and Mellen Street between Deering and Congress. It also extends a short way west of Mellen on the north side of Congress.

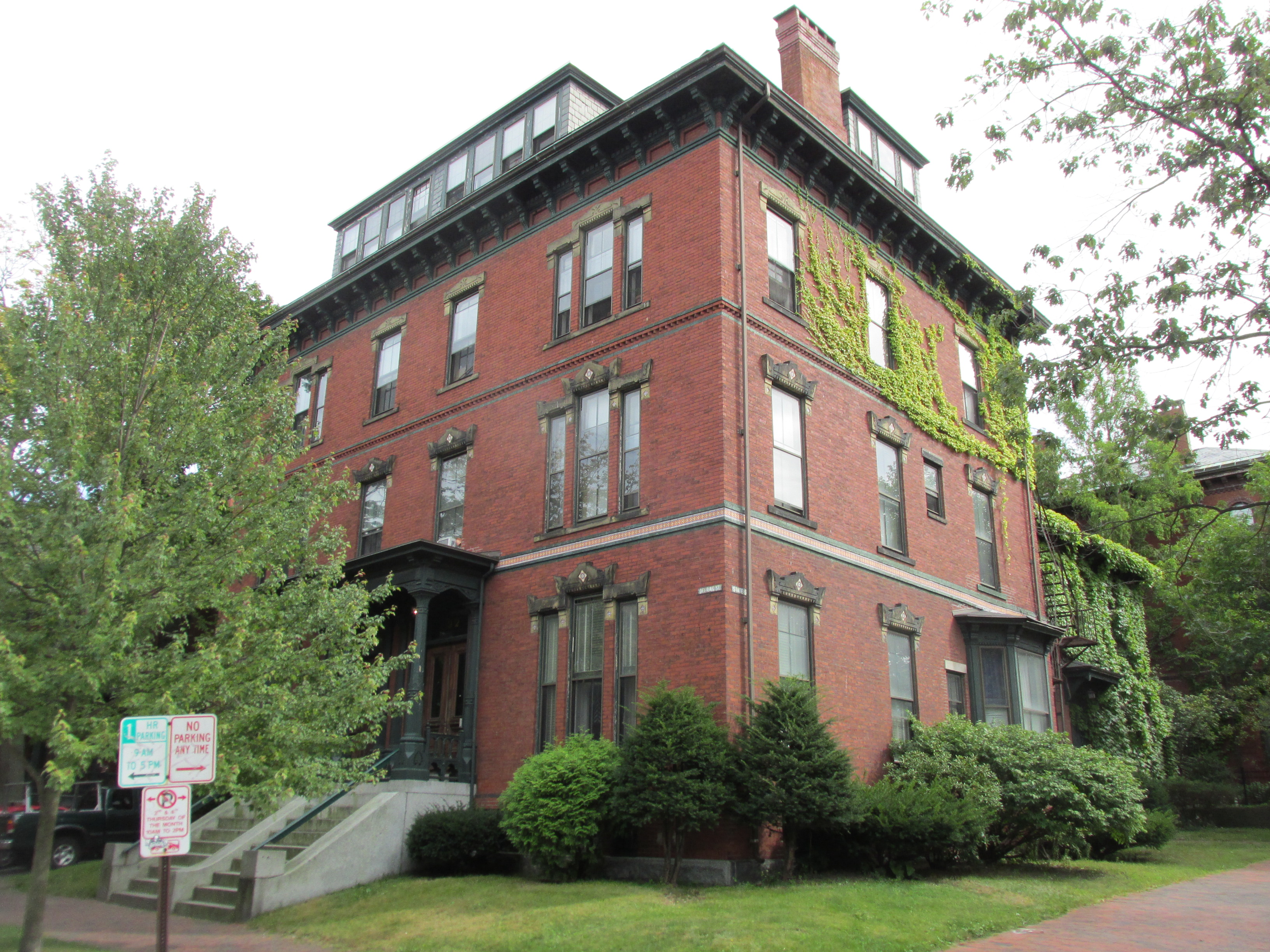
The Thomas Brackett Reed House, a National Historic Landmark

This area was mostly farmland until the mid-19th century, the city center to its southeast, and the port and major commercial area further east on the Falmouth peninsula. Development pressures prompted Nathaniel Deering, the landowner, to begin subdividing the area, and a few Greek Revival and Italianate homes were built in the area. Development pressure increased after Portland's great 1866 fire, after which other previously residential areas were redeveloped commercially. With its proximity to the downtown, the Deering Street area became a fashionable residential address for merchants, businessmen, and politicians. Many houses were built on speculation, and most were designed by prominent local architects, including John Calvin Stevens, Francis H. Fassett, and George M. Harding, the latter of whom made his home on Deering Street. Notable houses in the Deering Street Historic District include 52 Deering Street (1884), an early example of Stevens' important Shingle style work, The William H. Roberts, Jr. House at 15 Mellen Street (1898), one of the few remaining single family John Calvin Stevens homes on the Portland peninsula that retains its original floor plan, and the National Historic Landmark Thomas Brackett Reed House, designed by Fassett in 1876.

== See also ==
- National Register of Historic Places listings in Portland, Maine
