= Lovell Village Church =

Historic church in Maine, United States

- U.S. National Register of Historic Places
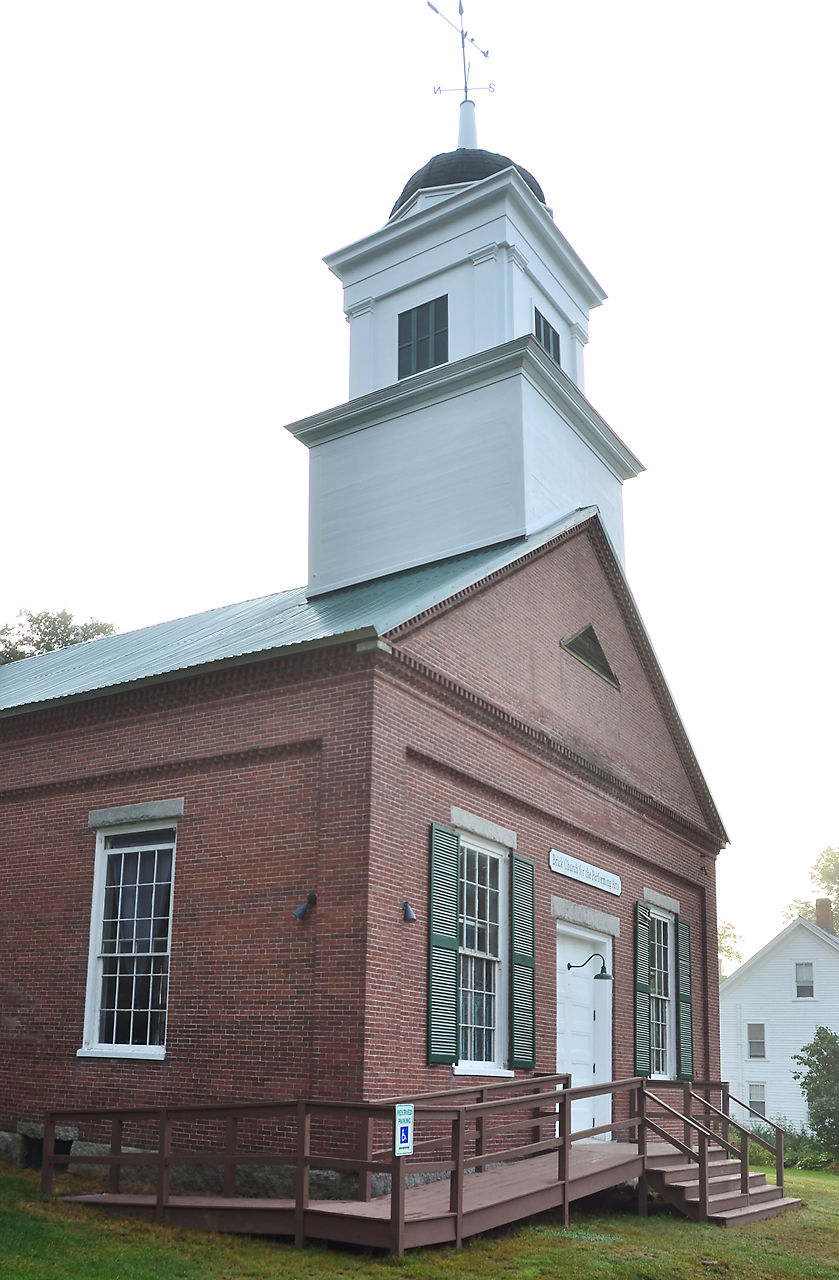

- Location within Maine Location within the United States
- Location: Church St., Lovell, Maine
- Coordinates: 44°7′40″N 70°53′36″W
- Area: 0.3 acres (0.12 ha)
- Built: 1851
- Architect: Cutter, Ammi
- Architectural style: Greek Revival
- NRHP reference No.: 86001337
- Added to NRHP: June 20, 1986

The Lovell Village Church is a historic church on Church Street in Lovell, Maine. It was built, and probably designed by, Ammi Cutter, a brickworker of some renown in the interior of western Maine. Completed in 1851, it is an architecturally significant example of Greek Revival. Its construction was occasioned by a slavery-related split in the local congregation. The building was added to the National Register of Historic Places in 1986.

== Description and history ==
The Lovell Village Church is a 1 1/2-story brick structure, with a gable roof topped by a wooden tower. The doors and windows have granite lintels and wooden sills. The main facade is three bays in width, with a slightly recessed centered entrance flanked by sash windows. The corners of the building are marked by brick piers, which rise to a flat entablature. The gable end is fully enclosed, with a dentillated border, and a triangular louver in the center of the tympanum. The tower rises in stages, beginning with a square section finished in clapboards, above which is a stepped-down belfry, which is finished in flushboarding with corner pilasters and a full entablature. Above this is a hexagonal section which is topped by a round dome and weathervane.

The Congregational Church was established in Lovell in the early 1800s, and held its services in the town meeting house. A local resident moved to Georgia in 1841, and during his time there, owned slaves. Upon his return to Lovell, the congregation divided on whether he should be readmitted to the fold based on this history. The split resulted in the construction of two new churches in the town, of which this is one. It was built in 1851 by Ammi Cutter, a brick maker and mason whose work was widely known in the region.

== See also ==
- National Register of Historic Places listings in Oxford County, Maine
