= Church of the New Jerusalem (Fryeburg, Maine) =

Historic church in Maine, United States

- U.S. National Register of Historic Places
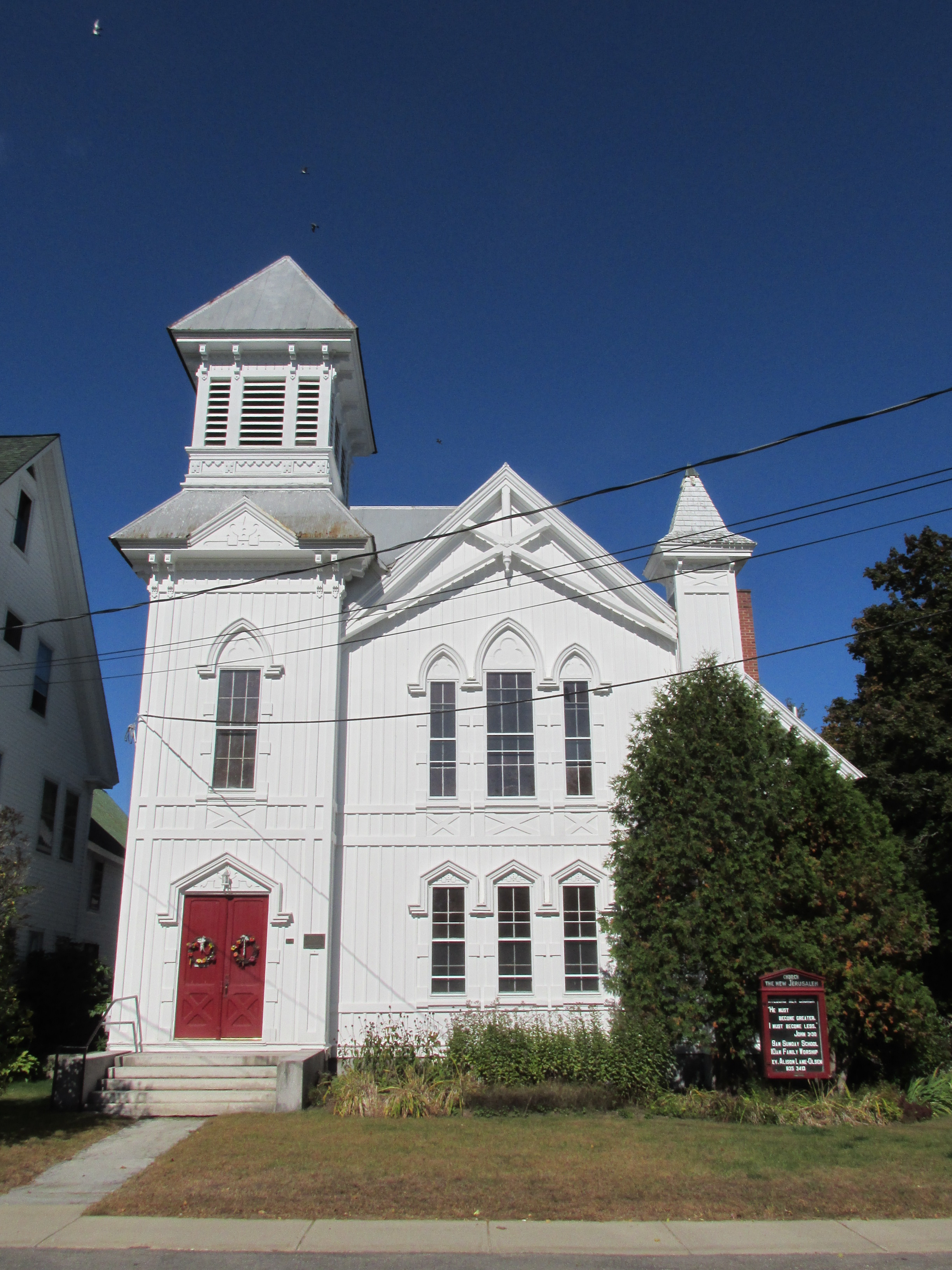
- Church of the New Jerusalem

- Location within Maine Location within the United States
- Location: 12 Oxford St., Fryeburg, Maine
- Coordinates: 44°00′56″N 70°58′49″W
- Area: 0.5 acres (0.20 ha)
- Built: 1879
- Architect: Charles H. Kimball; Calvin Merrill
- Architectural style: Stick/Eastlake
- NRHP reference No.: 86001274
- Added to NRHP: June 13, 1986

The Church of the New Jerusalem, now known as The Fryeburg New Church, is a congregation of The New Church (Swedenborgianism) at 12 Oxford Street in Fryeburg, Maine. The historic church building is a Stick style structure designed by Portland architect, Charles H. Kimball, and built in 1878. It was listed on the National Register of Historic Places in 1986.

== Architecture and building history ==
The church building is a two-story wood frame structure, set on a narrow side street just off Main Street in Fryeburg center. It has board-and-batten siding, and a gable roof. A two-story tower at the southeast corner of the building provides the main entrance and a belfry, while a smaller engaged tower adorns the other corner of the main facade. The belfry of the main tower is a louvered square, and is topped by a pyramidal roof. The smaller tower is also topped by a pyramidal roof, but the base courses of the roof are flared out. The front-facing gable end of the church is heavily decorated with Stick style applied woodwork, including Gothic lancet-shaped headers over the windows and brackets under the eaves. Many of these details are repeated in the interior decoration, where wood inlay is found in the ceiling, pews, and other furnishings. In addition to the main sanctuary, the building houses a library, kitchen, pantry, and dining area.

The building was designed by Portland architect Charles H. Kimball, and is one of his finest ecclesiastical works. It was built for a recently formed Swedenborgian congregation, and was completed in 1897 at a cost of $4,000. It was just the third Swedenborgian church in the state.

== See also ==
- National Register of Historic Places listings in Oxford County, Maine
