= Old Saco High School =

- Saco High School (old)
- U.S. National Register of Historic Places
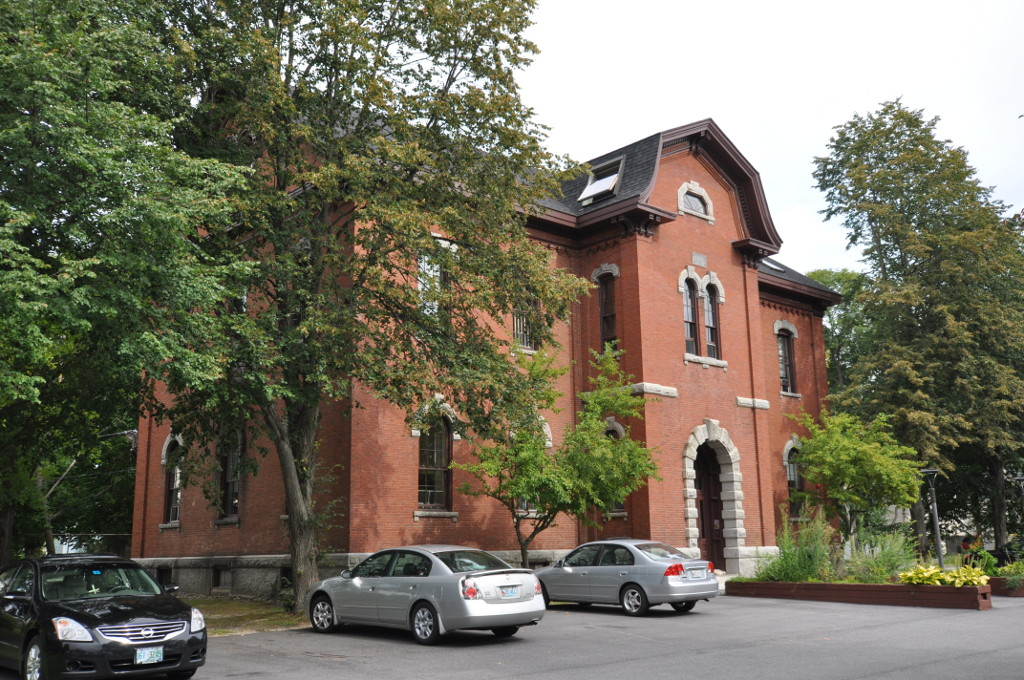

- Location within Maine Location within the United States
- Location: Spring St., Saco, Maine
- Coordinates: 43°30′9″N 70°26′21″W
- Area: 0.5 acres (0.20 ha)
- Built: 1871
- Architect: George M. Harding
- Architectural style: Late Victorian, Victorian
- NRHP reference No.: 83000483
- Added to NRHP: July 14, 1983

The Old Saco High School, also formerly the Sweetser School, is a historic former school building on Spring Street in Saco, Maine. Built in 1871–72, it is a late work of the noted Portland architect George M. Harding, and one of the city's finest Victorian public buildings. It was listed on the National Register of Historic Places in 1983, and now houses apartments.

== Description and history ==
The Old Saco High School stands on the northwest side of Spring Street, on a parcel that extends between Dyer and Bradley Streets, north of Saco's central business district. It is a 2-1/2 story brick structure, basically rectangular in shape, with a side-facing slate gabled roof that has brackets and dentil moulding at the eave. Its main facade, facing Spring Street, is symmetrical, with a central pavilion that rises to a concave mansard roof. The main entrance is set in the base of this pavilion, in a tall round-arch opening articulated by rustic granite quoining. First floor windows have round-arch tops with keystoned round-arch lintels; second floor windows have segmented-arch tops.

The school was built in 1871–72, and was designed by Portland architect George M. Harding, a leading regional architect of the period. The school is similar to others Harding designed in the years before, and was one of his last public school commissions. The building underwent certified rehabilitation in 1984, and now houses nine residential units.

== See also ==
- National Register of Historic Places listings in York County, Maine
