= Moses Kilgore =

American politician (1817–1890)

Moses Kilgore (March 19, 1817 – October 14, 1890) was an American businessman and politician.

Kilgore was born in Lovell, Maine. In 1852, he moved to Racine, Wisconsin. He then moved to Port Washington, Wisconsin and built a pier. In 1860, Kilgore moved to Baileys Harbor, Wisconsin where he built a pier and was in the ship building business. Kilgore was also a farmer and a merchant. In 1868, Kilgore served in the Wisconsin State Assembly and was a Democrat. Kilgore died at his home after not feeling very well.
