= Hayford Block =

- U.S. National Register of Historic Places
- U.S. Historic district – Contributing property
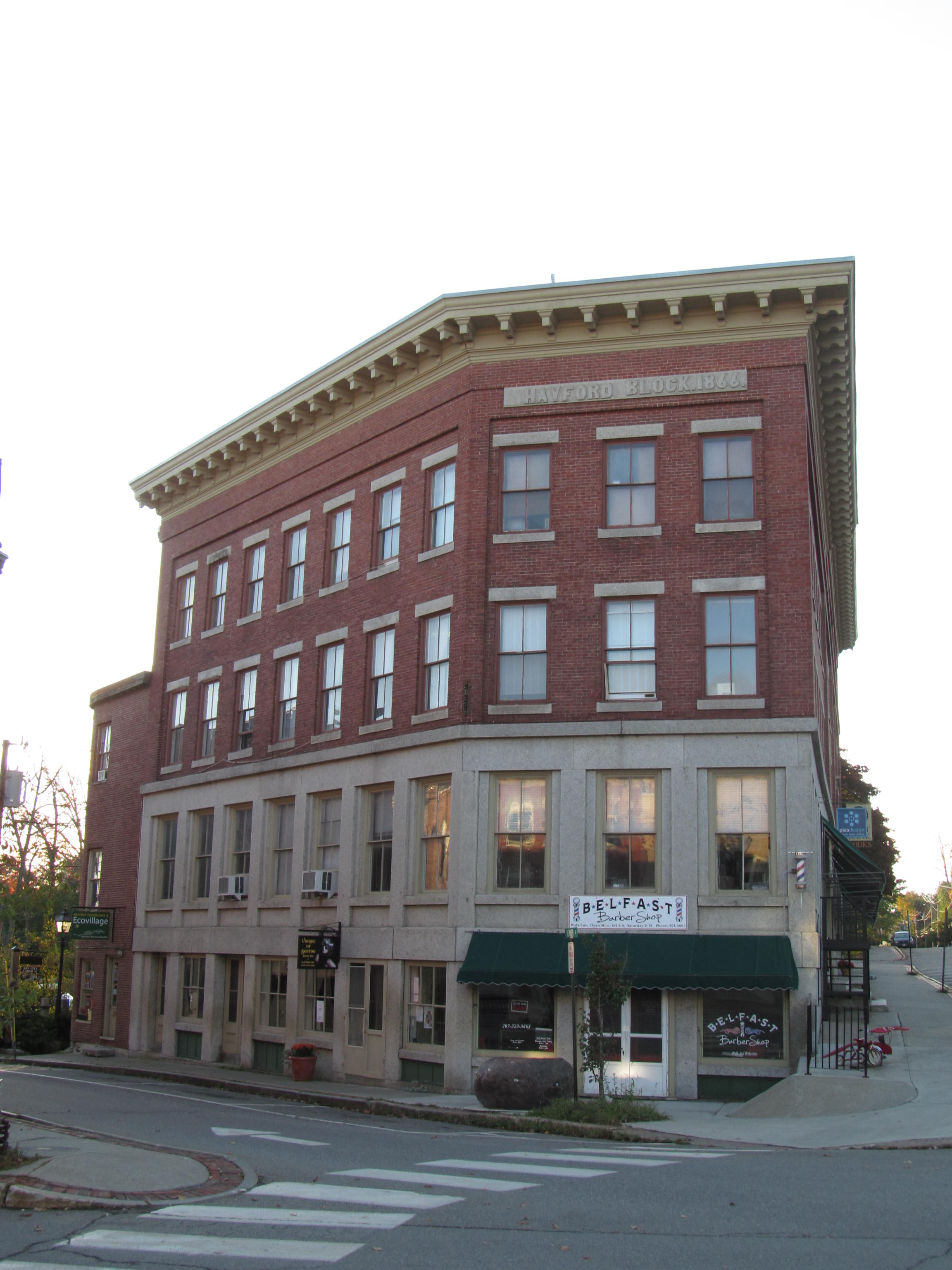

- Location within Maine Location within the United States
- Location: 47 Church St., Belfast, Maine
- Coordinates: 44.42525°N 69.00747°W
- Area: 1 acre (0.40 ha)
- Built: 1866
- Architect: n/a
- Architectural style: Greek Revival, Italianate
- Part of: Belfast Commercial Historic District (ID80000257)
- NRHP reference No.: 77000087

Significant dates
- Added to NRHP: August 29, 1977
- Designated CP: April 4, 1980

The Hayford Block is a historic commercial building at 47 Church Street in downtown Belfast, Maine. Built in 1866 and enlarged in 1869, it was the first significant construction after a major fire devastated central Belfast in 1865. It is also home to Hayford Hall, an opera house that was for many years the city's major performance venue.

== Description and history ==
The commercial heart of Belfast is a five-way intersection including Main Street, Church Street, and Beaver Street. The Hayford Block is located on the east side of this intersection bounded on the north by Beaver Street and the south by Church Street. The block has two distinct sections: the one facing the intersection, which is three stories in height, and one further along Church Street, which is four stories. The three-story section has a "flatiron" triangular form, with an exposed basement level along Beaver Street. The first floor and basement are finished in granite, with retail storefronts. The second and third floors are identical, with sash windows set between stone sills and lintels, with projecting brick piers at the corners and ends of the section. A broad bracketed cornice tops the structure. The four-story section continues the same styling, the only notable difference being a second-floor loading bay facing Church Street, set under a projecting cornice. This section also houses the former opera house, a 1300-seat performance space with relatively restrained decoration.

The Hayford Block was built by Belfast Mayor Axel Hayford, the first major construction to take place after a devastating fire swept through downtown Belfast in 1865, at a cost of $35,000. The three-story section was completed in 1866, and the four-story section was added in 1869. The opera house was one of the city's leading performance venues, playing host to traveling theater companies, vaudeville shows, and local entertainment.

== Renovation Plans ==
The building was listed on the National Register of Historic Places on August 29, 1977. and placed on the "Most Endangered Properties" list in 2014.. In October, 2025, the Old Belfast Opera House, LLC submitted plans to renovate Hayford Block and the Opera House, bringing them up to present-day standards.

== See also ==
- National Register of Historic Places listings in Waldo County, Maine
