= Primrose Hill Historic District =

Historic district in Maine, United States

- U.S. National Register of Historic Places
- U.S. Historic district
- U.S. Historic district – Contributing property
- Location within Maine Location within the United States
- Location: High and Anderson Sts., Belfast, Maine
- Coordinates: 44°25′16″N 69°0′44″W
- Area: 13 acres (5.3 ha)
- Built: 1809
- Architectural style: Federal
- Part of: Belfast Historic District (ID86002733)
- NRHP reference No.: 73000150

Significant dates
- Added to NRHP: October 3, 1973
- Designated CP: August 21, 1986

The Primrose Hill Historic District encompasses a group of high-quality 19th century residences in Belfast, Maine. Set on Church and High Streets between Primrose and Anderson, this area is where the elite of early 19th-century Belfast built their homes. Four of the five most prominent houses are Federal, while one is Gothic Revival in style. The district was listed on the National Register of Historic Places in 1973.

== Description and history ==
The Primrose Hill area of Belfast was developed after High Street was laid out in 1805. The part of High Street north of the city's central business district is elevated, with commanding views over the downtown and harbor beyond. As such, it became a desirable location for the city's elite to live. The historic district, when described in 1973 for listing on the National Register of Historic Places, described only five properties, extending along High Street from Primrose Street south to a triangular junction with High and Church Streets, and then south on Church Street to Anderson. Its bounds, however, are actually larger, as a portion of Anderson Street (between Church and Waldo Streets) was included in a 1993 amendment to the Belfast Historic District due to its earlier inclusion in this district. (The Belfast Historic District was intended to completely include this district).

On the east side of High Street stand two of the district's finer houses. The Benjamin Field House is a Federal style two-story wood-frame house, with a hip roof, while directly to its south is the 1824 Benjamin Haseltine House, also Federal style. On the west side of High Street, opposite the Field House, stands the Johnson-Pratt House, built in 1812 for the son of one of Bowdoin College's founders. It has an elaborate Ionic portico, which was added about 1830. To its south stands the 1859 Gothic Revival House of Charles Haseltine, and the Anderson House, one of Belfast's finest brick Federal-style houses, stands further south; it was the residence of Hugh J. Anderson, a Governor of Maine. Houses on Anderson Street include a fine Gothic Revival cottage built by a ship's captain about 1853.

== See also ==
- National Register of Historic Places listings in Waldo County, Maine
