= Church Street Historic District (Belfast, Maine) =

Historic district in Maine, United States

- U.S. National Register of Historic Places
- U.S. Historic district
- U.S. Historic district – Contributing property
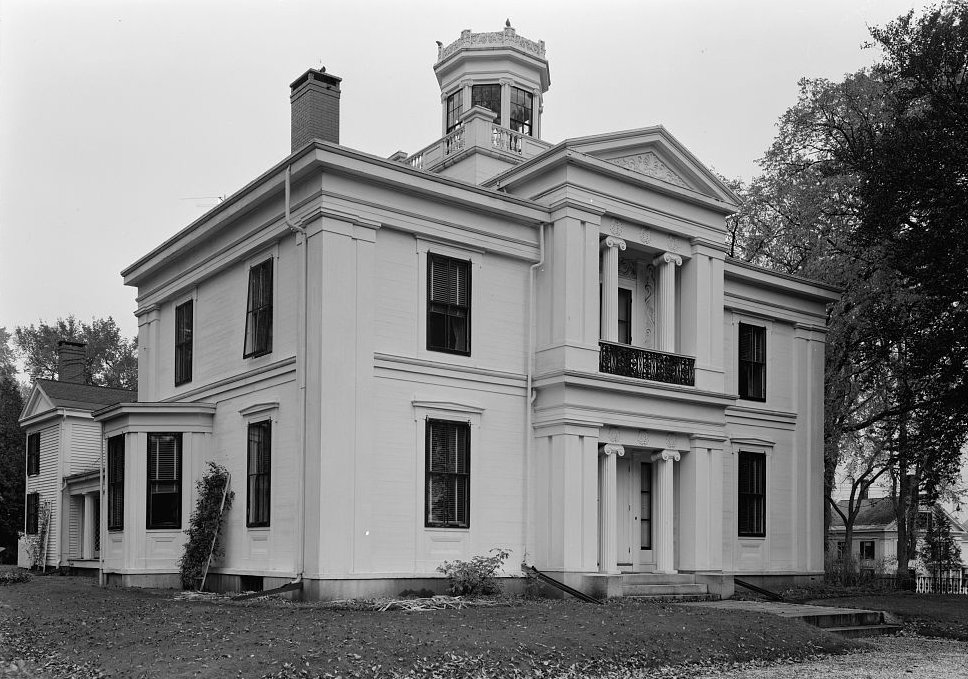
- The James P. White House, 1960 HABS photo

- Location within Maine Location within the United States
- Location: Irregular pattern along Church St. from High to Franklin Sts., Belfast, Maine
- Coordinates: 44°25′23″N 69°0′14″W
- Area: 30 acres (12 ha)
- Architect: Calvin Ryder, others
- Architectural style: Greek Revival, Federal, Italianate
- Part of: Belfast Historic District (ID86002733)
- NRHP reference No.: 78000331

Significant dates
- Added to NRHP: November 28, 1978
- Designated CP: August 21, 1986

The Church Street Historic District is a predominantly residential historic district in Belfast, Maine. The 30-acre (12 ha) district extends along Church Street roughly between Franklin and High Streets, and encompasses a neighborhood of homes dating from the early 19th to the early 20th century, the major period of the city's growth. The district was listed on the National Register of Historic Places in 1978, and is contained within the larger Belfast Historic District.

== Description and history ==
The city of Belfast, located on Penobscot Bay on the central Maine coast, became a major shipping and shipbuilding port after the War of 1812, and diversified economically as the 19th century progressed. Church Street, which extends south from the city's central business district and runs parallel to, but several blocks inland from, the city's waterfront, was the city's fashionable residential area. As a result, the street is lined with a succession of high-quality houses, reflecting primarily the styles of the first three quarters of the 19th century: the Federal, Greek Revival, and Italianate. These houses were built by sea captains, shipbuilders, businessmen, and industrialists, all of whom contributed to the city's economic growth.

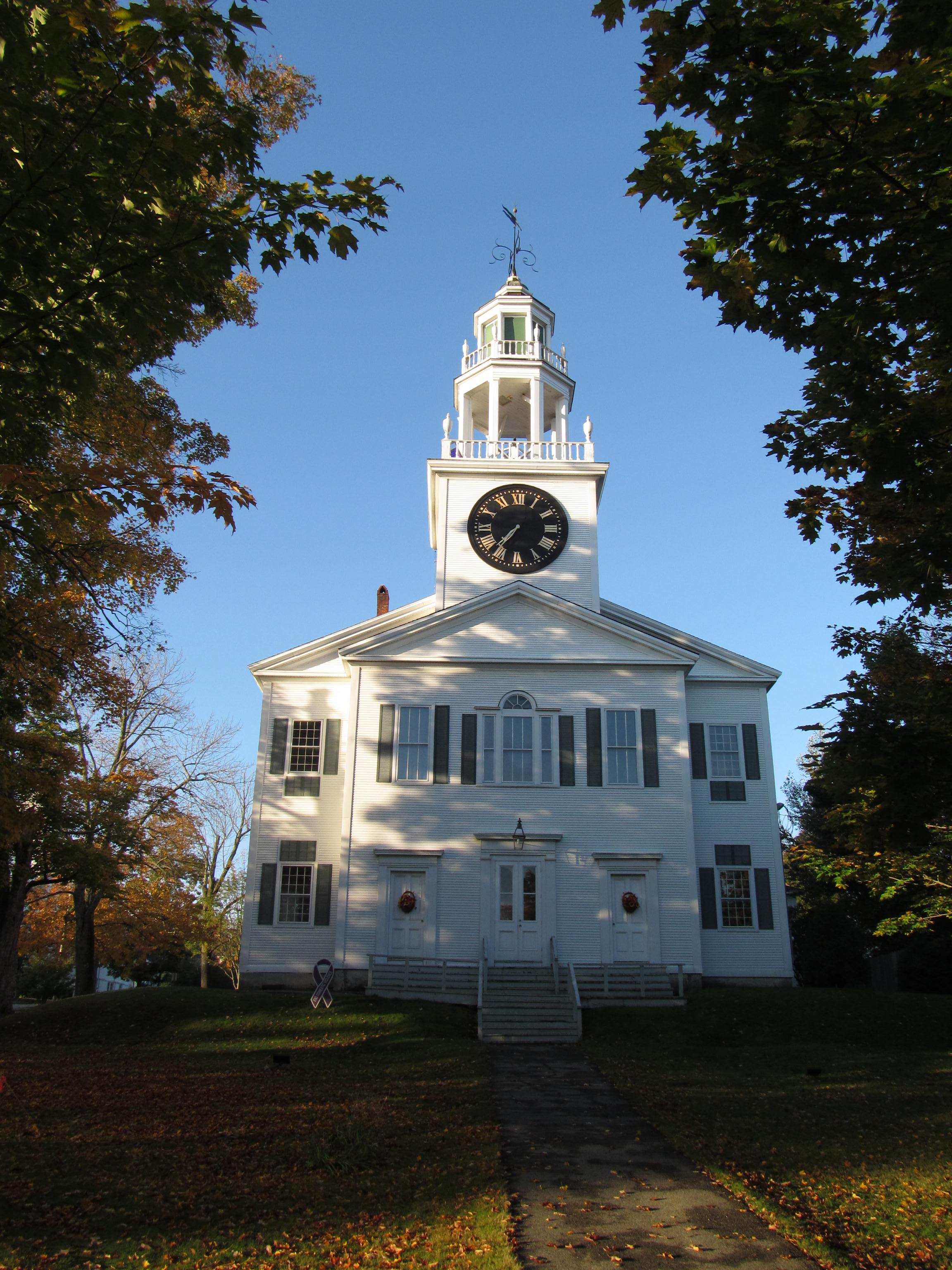
First Church of Belfast

The historic district's boundaries include all of the houses on the west side of Church Street between High and Miller Streets, and those on the east side between Spring and High Streets. It also includes houses on the west side of High Street north of Church, as well as two blocks of Court Street (which parallels Church to the west) between Franklin and Miller Streets. The district is anchored at its northern end by the 1818 First Church of Belfast, one of two churches in the district, and at the southern end by the James P. White House, a fine Greek Revival house built in 1840. The White House was designed by Calvin Ryder, a local architect whose work appears throughout the district. The Williamson House at 18 Church Street, also designed by Ryder, is a particularly handsome Greek Revival house with a full temple front treatment.

== See also ==
- National Register of Historic Places listings in Waldo County, Maine
