= Charles H. Kimball =

American architect

- Born: March 31, 1852; Lovell, Maine
- Died: 1887; Portland, Maine
- Occupation: Architect
- Practice: Kimball & Coombs, C. H. Kimball
- Buildings: Deering High School, Marble Block, Church of the New Jerusalem

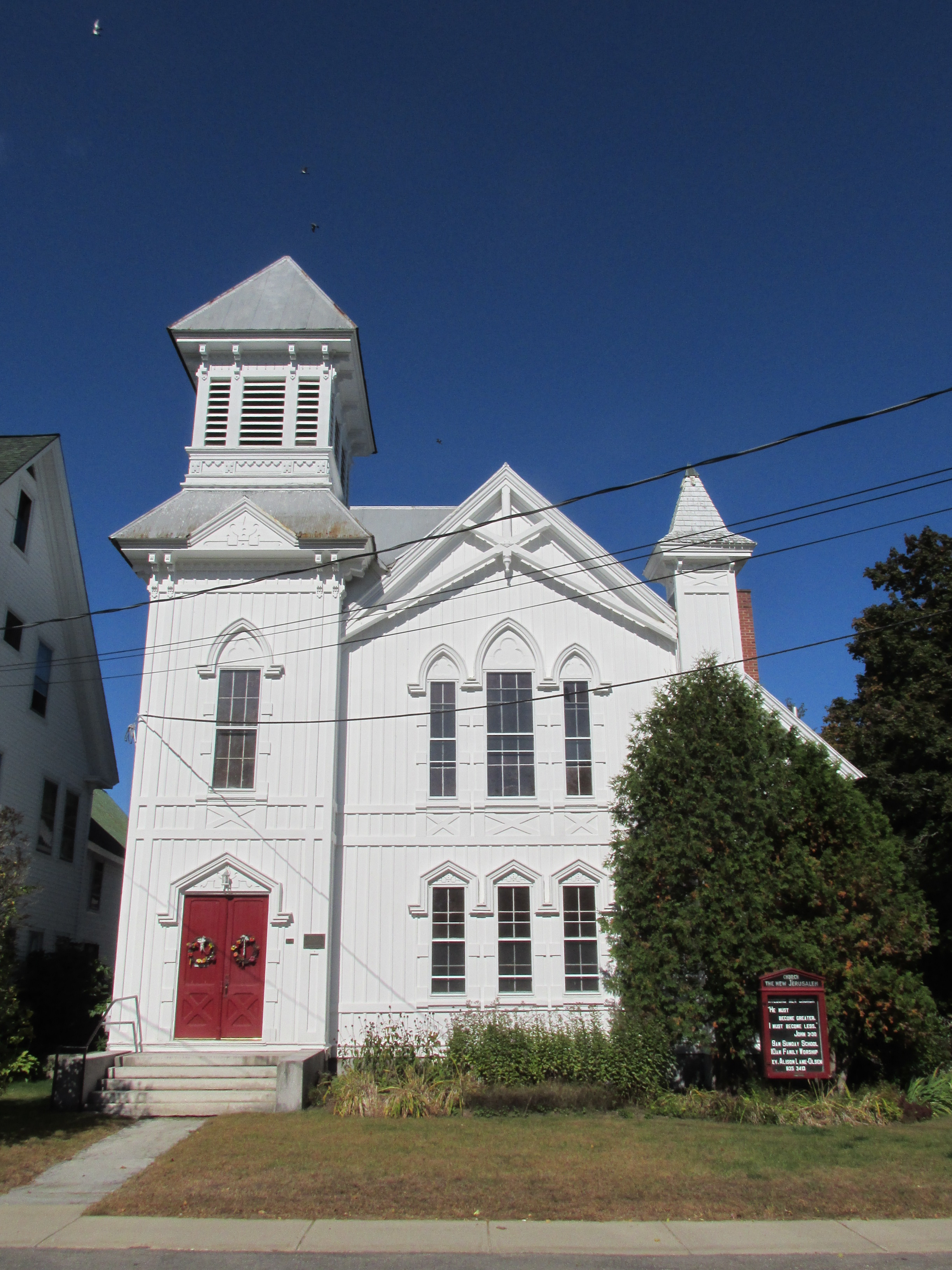
Church of the New Jerusalem, Fryeburg, Maine, 1878.

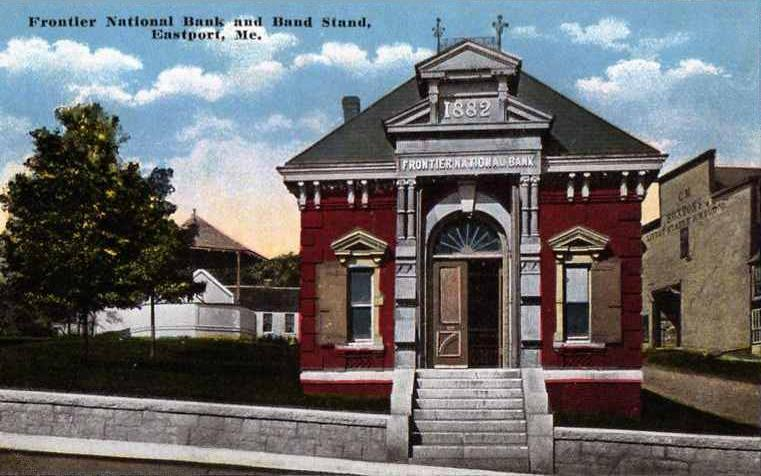
Frontier National Bank Building, Eastport, Maine, 1882.

Charles H. Kimball (March 31, 1852 – 1887) was an American architect from Maine.

== Life ==
Kimball was born in Lovell, Maine, in 1852, and was the son of a dentist. His family moved to Portland when he was very young. Kimball graduated from Portland High School in 1869. By 1871, he was working for George M. Harding, a local architect. In 1874, he left Portland for Lewiston and established a practice with George M. Coombs, a native of that city. Kimball & Coombs dissolved later that year, and Kimball had opened his own office in Portland by 1875. He practiced alone until his death in 1887.

He is notable as one of the only Maine architects to embrace the Stick Style. His buildings in this mode include the original Deering High School, the Church of the New Jerusalem in Fryeburg, and the former Kezar Falls M. E. Church.

== Architectural works ==
=== Kimball & Coombs, 1874 ===
- 1874 - Albert F. Ames House, 73 Talbot Ave, Rockland, Maine

=== C. H. Kimball, 1875-1887 ===
- 1875 - P. Fox Varnum Houses, Varnum St, Portland, Maine
  - Demolished.
- 1876 - James E. Wengren House, 11 Mellen St, Portland, Maine
- 1877 - Deering High School, 432 Stevens Ave, Deering, Maine
  - Demolished.
- 1877 - George C. Frye House, 296 Congress St, Portland, Maine
  - Demolished.
- 1877 - Marble Block, 129 Main St, Biddeford, Maine
- 1878 - Church of the New Jerusalem, 4 Oxford St, Fryeburg, Maine
- 1880 - Frank L. Bartlett House, 27 Pine St, Portland, Maine
- 1880 - Daniel M. Bonney House, 8 Court St, Farmington, Maine
- 1881 - Shailer School, 58 North St, Portland, Maine
- 1882 - Frontier National Bank Building, 30 Water St, Eastport, Maine
- 1883 - Kezar Falls M. E. Church, 5 School St, Kezar Falls, Maine
- 1884 - James H. Waugh House, 252 Main St, Farmington, Maine
