= First Church of Belfast =

Historic church in Maine, United States

- U.S. National Register of Historic Places
- U.S. Historic district – Contributing property
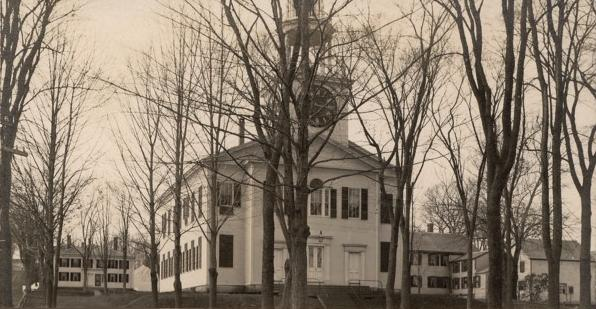

- Location within Maine Location within the United States
- Location: 8 Court St., Belfast, Maine
- Coordinates: 44°25′28″N 69°0′27″W
- Area: less than one acre
- Built: 1818
- Architect: French, Samuel
- Architectural style: Federal
- Part of: Church Street Historic District (ID78000331)
- NRHP reference No.: 76000115

Significant dates
- Added to NRHP: November 07, 1976
- Designated CP: November 28, 1978

The First Church of Belfast is a historic church at 8 Court Street in Belfast, Maine. The church congregation was founded in 1796, and its present building was built in 1818. The well-preserved Federal style church was listed on the National Register of Historic Places in 1976, as one of a few churches in the state based closely on the designs of Asher Benjamin. The congregation is affiliated with the United Church of Christ; its current bridge pastor is Rev. Joe Schulte.

== Architecture and history ==
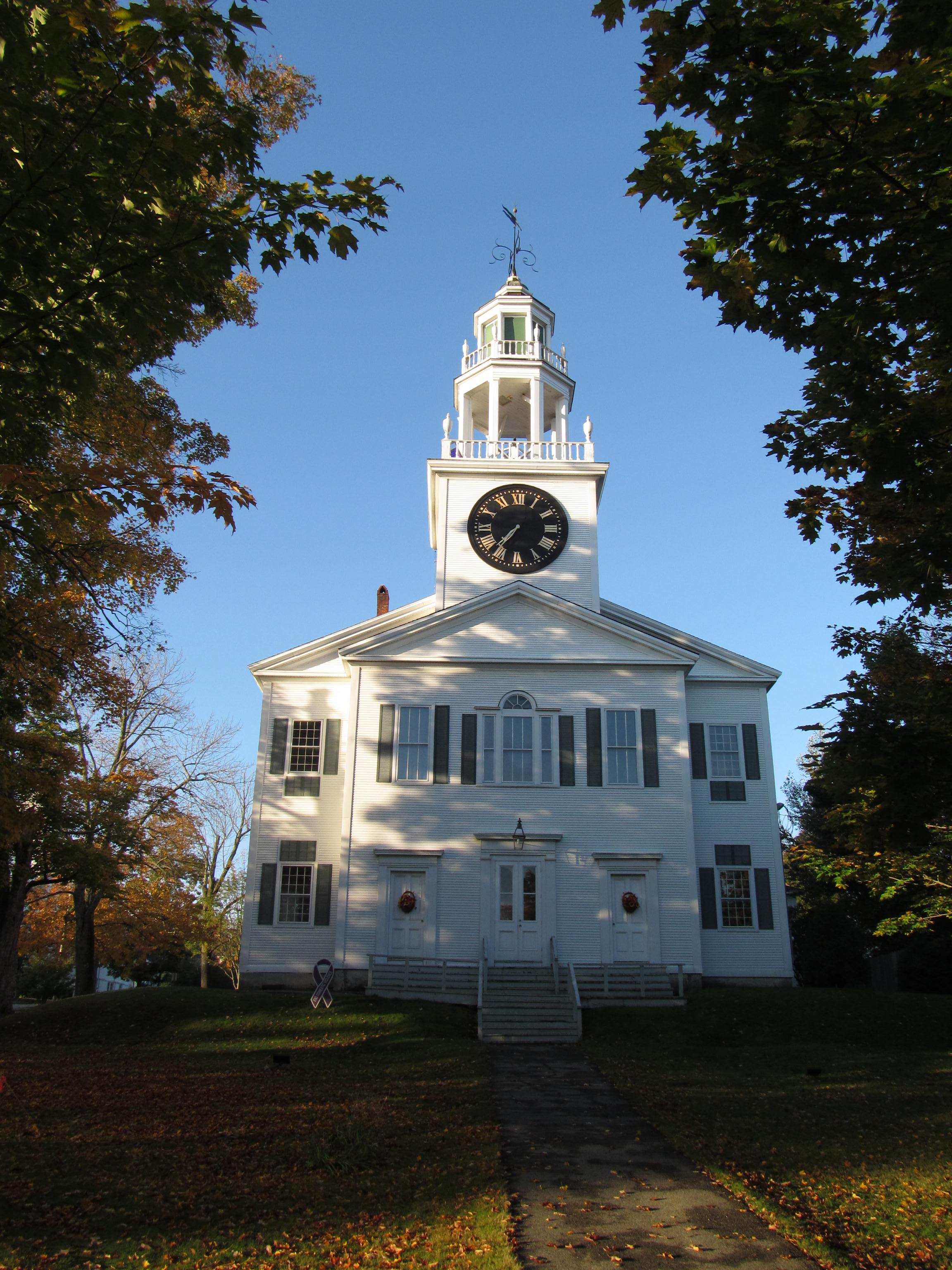
2012 image

The church is set just south of Belfast's central business district, on a large parcel of land bounded on the northeast by Church Street, the southwest by Court Street, and the southeast by Spring Street. It is set facing Church Street, but well back on the lot, with a grassy lawn dotted with trees in front. The building is a two-story gable-roofed wood-frame structure, built largely to a plan published by Asher Benjamin in The Country Builder's Assistant in 1798. Its front facade has a central projecting section with a gabled top, in which three entrance doors are set. The outer two are identical, with flanking pilasters and entablature above, while the central one is a taller double-leaf door with a similar surround. A tower rises astride the main facade and gable, beginning with a square section housing large clock faces. Above this is an open octagonal belfry housing a Revere bell, with Doric columns supporting the next octagonal stage, which supports the cupola and finial. The lower two stages have low balustrades framing their tops, with urn-topped posts at the corners.

Belfast's Congregationalist church was organized in 1796, the town having first been settled in the 1770s by Scotch-Irish Presbyterians. At first sharing the meetinghouse with the Presbyterians, they built the present edifice in 1818. The design and construction were overseen by the master builder Samuel French, but are clearly based on the published work of Asher Benjamin. In 1868 it was remodeled, its original box pews removed, and gas lighting installed. The adjacent parish house was dedicated in 1926.

== See also ==
- National Register of Historic Places listings in Waldo County, Maine
