= Belfast National Bank =

- U.S. National Register of Historic Places
- U.S. Historic district – Contributing property
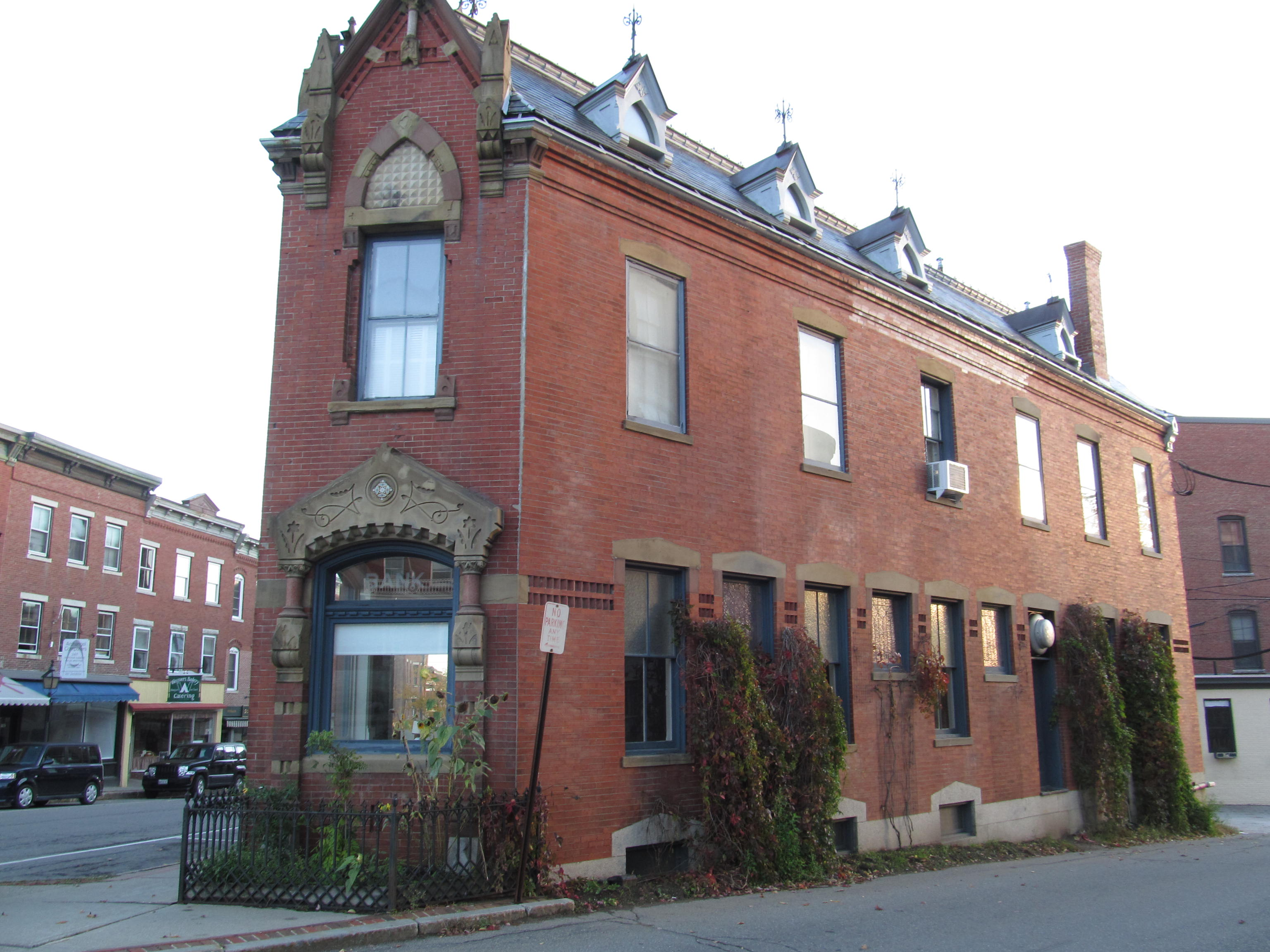

- Location within Maine Location within the United States
- Location: Main and Beaver Sts., Belfast, Maine
- Coordinates: 44°25′32″N 69°0′26″W
- Area: less than one acre
- Built: 1879
- Built by: Israel Wood Parker
- Architect: George M. Harding
- Part of: Belfast Commercial Historic District (ID80000257)
- NRHP reference No.: 73000148

Significant dates
- Added to NRHP: April 23, 1973
- Designated CP: April 4, 1980

The Belfast National Bank is a historic commercial building at Main and Beaver Streets in downtown Belfast, Maine. Built in 1879 and enlarged twelve years later, it is one of the city's most elaborately decorated buildings. It was designed by George M. Harding, and was listed on the National Register of Historic Places in 1973.

== Description and history ==
The Belfast National Bank Building stands at the five-way intersection of Main, Beaver, and Church Streets at the historic commercial center of the city. It is set on a triangular lot defined on the north by Main Street and the east by Beaver Street. It is 2-1/2 story brick structure, with mansard roofing along the long sides that meet at a gable-topped single-bay side that faces the intersection. That gable, along with those of the dormers that pierce the roof, feature decorative cresting. The dormer windows have the shape of Gothic lancet points, a detail repeated in a window on the short facade. The ground floor of the building has modern store windows, while the second floor has sash windows with carved lintels above.

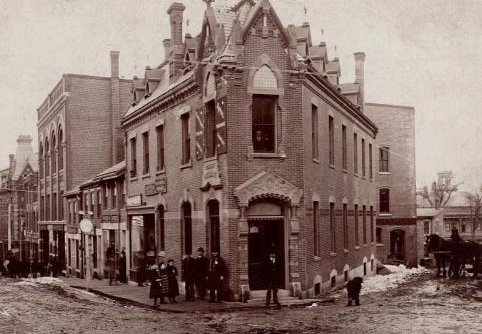
Photo c. 1878

The building was designed by Portland based architect George M. Harding and built in 1878-79 by Israel Wood Parker of Belfast, when the city was at its height as a shipping and shipbuilding center. This pair also notably collaborated on Belfast's Masonic Hall, which also faces the same intersection. The building was built for the Belfast National Bank, which had previously occupied leased quarters in another building since 1857.

== See also ==
- National Register of Historic Places listings in Waldo County, Maine
