= George M. Harding =

American architect

George Milford Harding
- Born: 1827; Chatham, Massachusetts
- Died: 1910 (aged 82–83)
- Occupation: Architect
- Practice: Silloway & Harding; George M. Harding

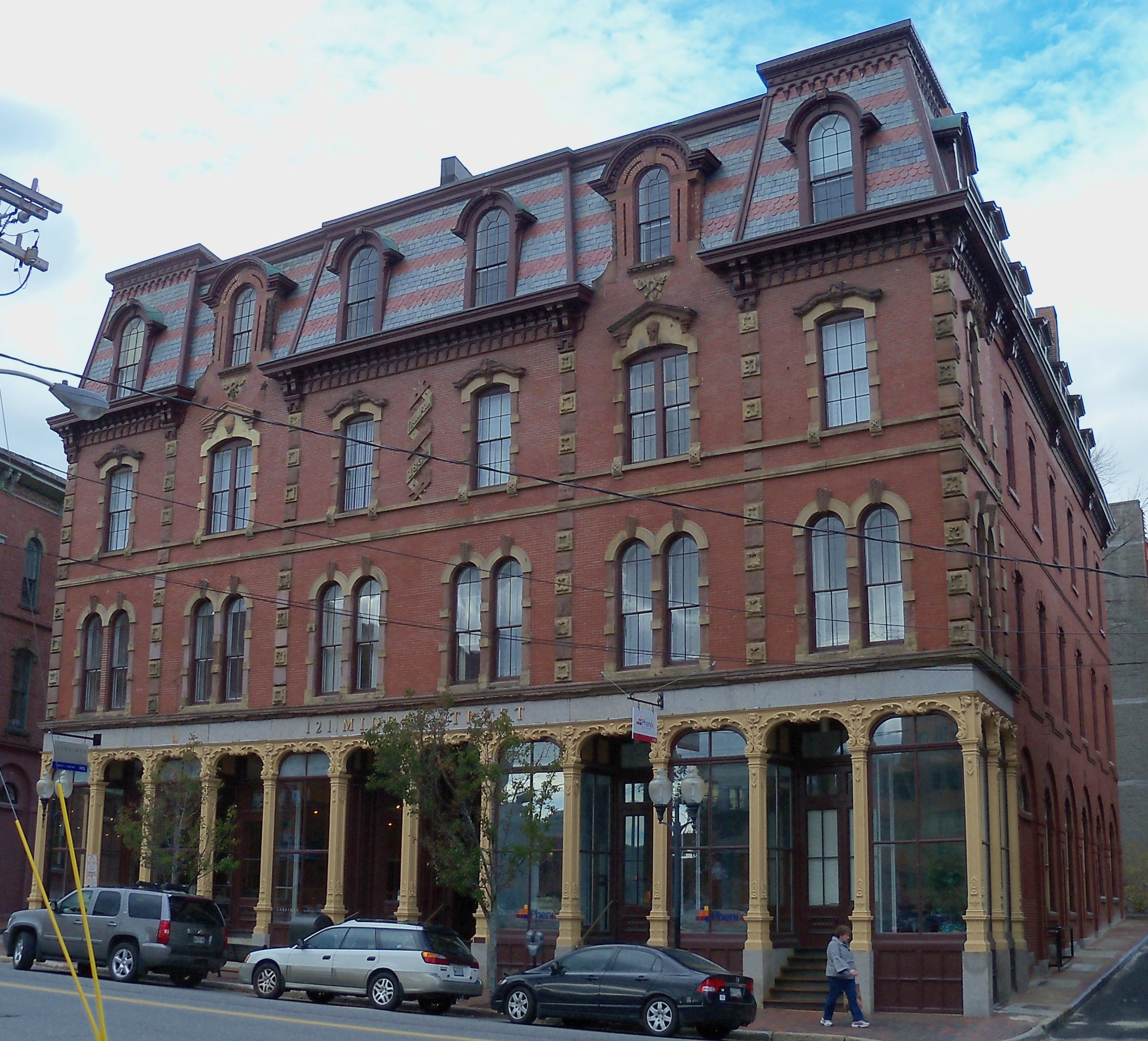
Thompson Block, Portland, 1867.

George Milford Harding (1827–1910) was an American architect who practiced in nineteenth-century Massachusetts, New Hampshire, and Maine.

== Life and career ==
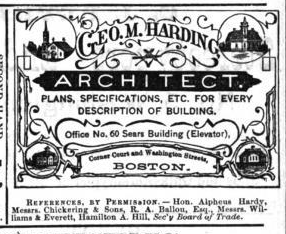
Advertisement for Harding, 1873.

Harding was born in 1827 in Chatham, Massachusetts. At the age of 17 he began his studies at the Lowell Institute in Boston, probably working in the office of a local architect as well.

In 1851, Harding established a partnership with Thomas W. Silloway. Silloway & Harding was dissolved by April, 1853, and both established private offices. Harding soon set his sights on northern New England, and was practicing in Concord, New Hampshire by 1854. By 1856 he was in Manchester. In 1858, he moved to Portland, Maine. It would also appear that for a time in the late 1860s he was employed as State Architect, and worked on a proposal for an expansion of the State House. He remained there until 1873, when he returned to Boston, though he continued to receive commissions to design buildings in Maine.

In the 1880s he relocated his office to Hyde Park, which was annexed to Boston in 1912.

== Legacy ==
Harding was one of several architects to rebuild important sections of downtown Portland after the fire of 1866. However, most of his work was made up of private residences and a large number of school buildings.

He was the teacher of several other architects, including Henry M. Francis of Fitchburg, Massachusetts and Charles H. Kimball, also of Portland.

A number of his works are listed on the U.S. National Register of Historic Places.

thumb

== Architectural works ==
Year	Building	Address	City	State	Notes	Image	Reference
1854	Benjamin Grover House	35 Pleasant St	Concord	New Hampshire			
1857	First Universalist Church	30 High St	Danvers	Massachusetts	Remodeled in 1925 into the Masonic Temple, Little & Browne, architects.		
1858	James L. Merrill House	310 Spring St	Portland	Maine			
1862	Joseph Drowne Houses	36-38 State St	Portland	Maine			
1863	Morrill's Corner School	808 Stevens Ave	Portland	Maine	Originally in Westbrook, then Deering.		
1863	Portland High School	284 Cumberland Ave	Portland	Maine	The original building has been obscured by later additions.		
1863	Searsport Union Hall	1 Union St	Searsport	Maine			
1865	William Allen Jr. House	9 Deering St	Portland	Maine			
1865	First Universalist Church	High St	Portland	Maine	Demolished.		
1865	Frye Grammar School	140 Ash St	Lewiston	Maine			
1865	Parsonage, Free Will Baptist Church	51 Ocean House Rd	Cape Elizabeth	Maine			
1866	Bailey & Noyes Block	56 Exchange St	Portland	Maine	Altered by the addition of several floors.		
1866	Searsport Union School	23 Mount Ephraim Rd	Searsport	Maine			
1867	Boyd Block	178 Middle St	Portland	Maine	Altered by the addition of a floor.		
1867	First Parish Congregational Church	116 Main St	Yarmouth	Maine			
1867	India Street Fire Station	97 India Street	Portland	Maine			
1867	Rackleff Building	129 Middle St	Portland	Maine			
1867	Thompson Block	121 Middle St	Portland	Maine			
1867	Woodman Building	75 Pearl St	Portland	Maine			
1868	Greely Institute	303 Main St	Cumberland	Maine			
1868	Houlton Academy	Military St	Houlton	Maine	Later known as Potter Hall, a dormitory. Demolished.		
1868	George M. Harding House	6 Deering St	Portland	Maine	The architect's own residence.		
1869	Israel Washburn House	385 Spring St	Portland	Maine			
1871	Chapel	Maine Insane Hospital	Augusta	Maine	Demolished.		
1871	Saco High School	34 Spring St	Saco	Maine			
1872	First Universalist Church	Pequawket Tr	Hiram	Maine			
1872	Norlands Meeting House	290 Norlands Rd	Livermore	Maine	A remodeling.		
1873	Haverhill High School	33 Winter St	Haverhill	Massachusetts	Demolished.		
1877	Masonic Temple	139 High St	Belfast	Maine			
1878	Belfast National Bank Building	108 Main St	Belfast	Maine			
1879	Gilkey House Belfast	58 Miller St	Belfast	Maine	Gothic Victorian House		
1881	Jacob E. Spring House, Porphyry Hall	72 Summer St	Danvers	Massachusetts	Now the administration building of St. John's Preparatory School.		
1886	George M. Harding House	58 Oak St	Hyde Park	Massachusetts	The architect's own residence.		
