= James P. White House =

Historic house in Maine, United States

- U.S. National Register of Historic Places
- U.S. Historic district – Contributing property
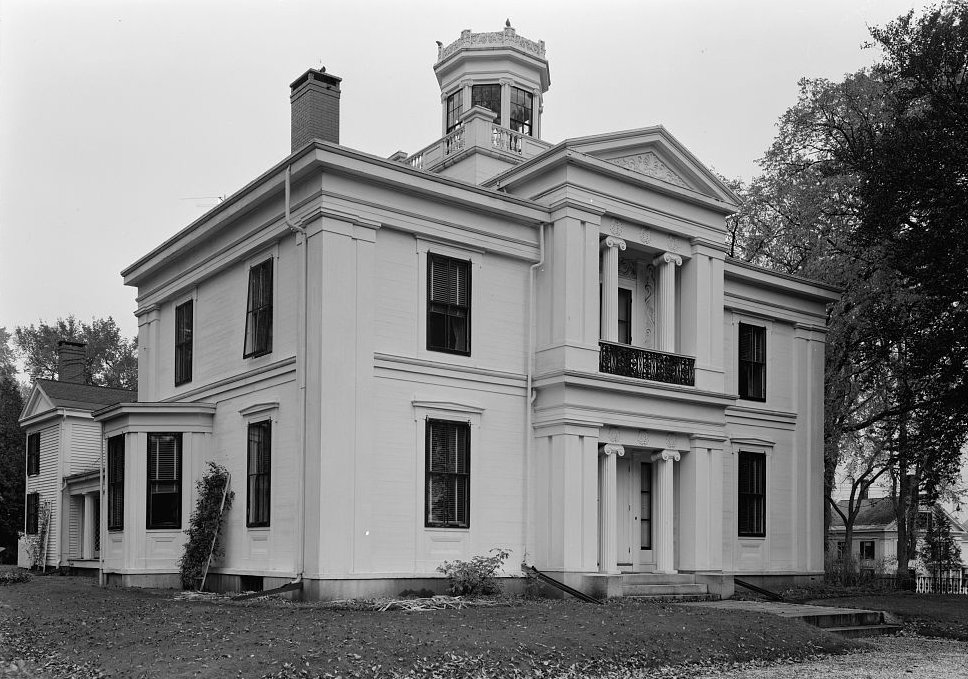

- Location within Maine Location within the United States
- Location: 1 Church St., Belfast, Maine
- Coordinates: 44°25′15″N 69°0′2″W
- Area: less than one acre
- Built: 1840
- Architect: Ryder, Calvin A. Ryder
- Architectural style: Greek Revival
- Part of: Church Street Historic District (ID78000331)
- NRHP reference No.: 73000245

Significant dates
- Added to NRHP: April 24, 1973
- Designated CP: November 28, 1978

The James P. White House is a historic house at 1 Church Street in Belfast, Maine. Built in 1840, it is one of the city's most elaborate examples of Greek Revival architecture. It was listed on the National Register of Historic Places in 1973, and is included in Belfast's Church Street Historic District. In recent years it has served as a bed and breakfast inn but, as of 2015, is a private residence once again.

== Description and history ==
The White House is located south of Belfast's central business district, at the southern end of Church Street, occupying a triangular lot at the corner of High Street. It is a two-story wood-frame structure, with a hip roof topped by a widow's walk and cupola, and a granite foundation. The front and sides are finished in flushboard siding, with clapboards elsewhere. The building corners have oversides pilasters with Doric capitals, rising to a multi-level entablature that encircles the building. The main facade is three bays wide, the center one projecting and rising to a gabled roof. The main entrance, and a second floor balcony entrance, are both recessed in this projecting, the recessed area articulated by pilasters and fluted columns.

The house was designed by Calvin Ryder, a local architect, for James Patterson White, and was completed in 1840. White, a Belfast native, was a successful businessman who served for two years as mayor. Later owners of the house included James Taliaferro, a Florida Senator who owned it as a summer residence. In the late 20th century the building served as a bed and breakfast inn. By 2015, the White House is a private residence once again. The present owner has erected a tall, white plastic fence around the property which prevents a clear view of the house.

== See also ==
- National Register of Historic Places listings in Waldo County, Maine
