= Union Hall (Searsport, Maine) =

- U.S. National Register of Historic Places
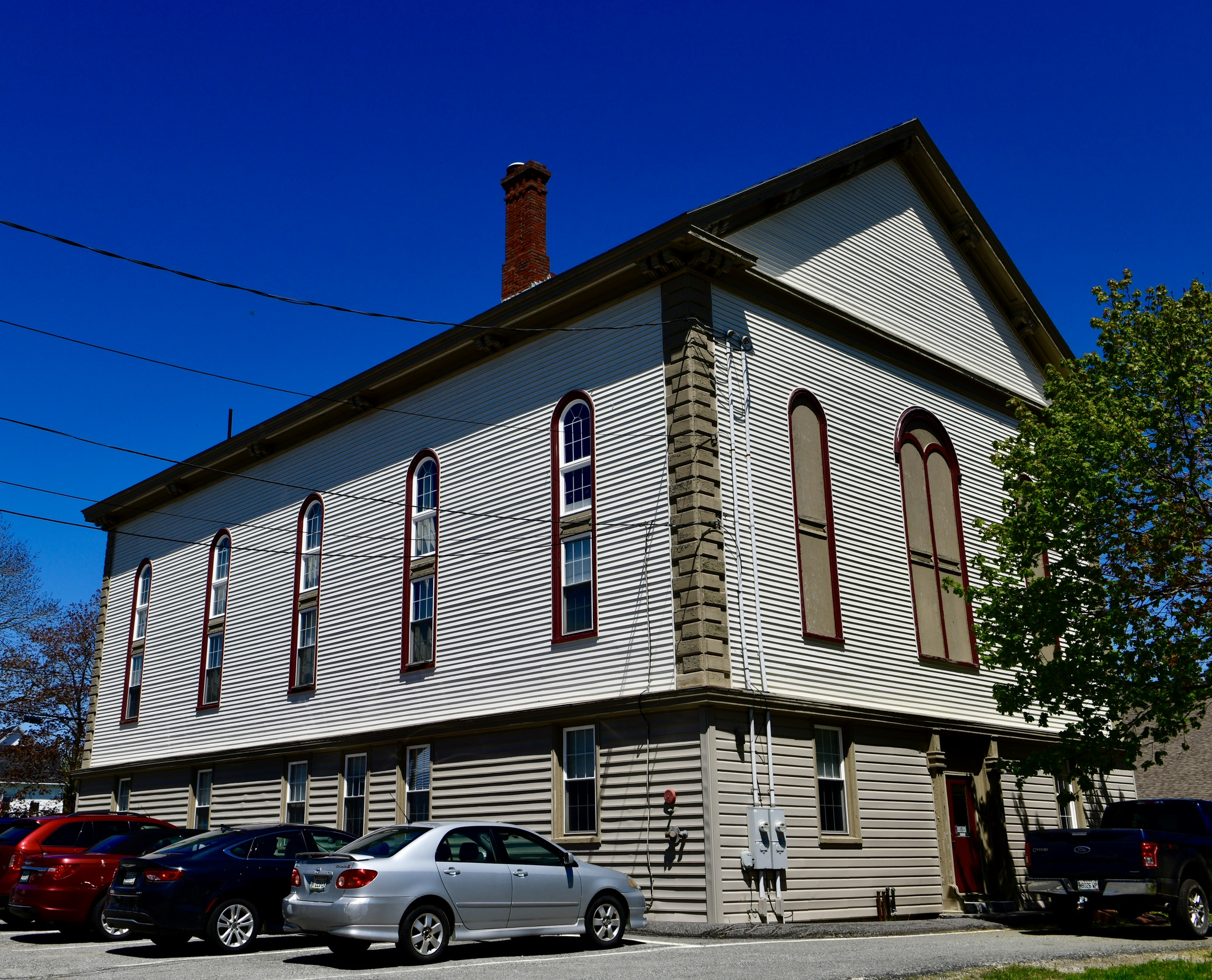

- Location within Maine Location within the United States
- Location: 3 Reservoir St. Searsport, Maine
- Coordinates: 44°27′34″N 68°55′28″W
- Area: 0.5 acres (0.20 ha)
- Built: 1863
- Architect: George M. Harding
- Architectural style: Italianate
- NRHP reference No.: 86000478
- Added to NRHP: March 20, 1986

Union Hall is the town hall of Searsport, Maine. It is located at 3 Reservoir Street in the town center. Built in 1863, it is a remarkably sophisticated example of Italianate architecture for a relatively small town, and was listed on the National Register of Historic Places in 1986 for its architecture.

== Description and history ==
Union Hall is located in the village center of Searsport, on the east side of Reservoir Street a short way north of United States Route 1. It is a 2 1/2-story wood-frame structure, with a gabled roof and clapboard siding. The ground floor is relatively low, housing town offices, while the upper level is tall, housing the auditorium space. The building has quoined corners, bracketed eaves, and entrances on the short ends that are flanked by pilasters. Ground floor windows are rectangular sash, while the upper floor windows are mainly very tall round-arch windows. On the ends there are paired segmented-arch windows in the gables. The building originally had a cupola. Its interior has modest but high quality woodwork, most of it original.

The hall was designed by Portland architect George M. Harding, and was built in 1863, at the height of the American Civil War. It is one of Maine's more imposing small-town town halls. In addition to the loss of the cupola, other minor alterations include the loss of a balcony on one end, and the provision of a fire escape door on the western end.

== See also ==
- National Register of Historic Places listings in Waldo County, Maine
