= Thomas Brackett Reed House =

Historic house in Maine, United States

- Thomas B. Reed House
- U.S. National Register of Historic Places
- U.S. National Historic Landmark
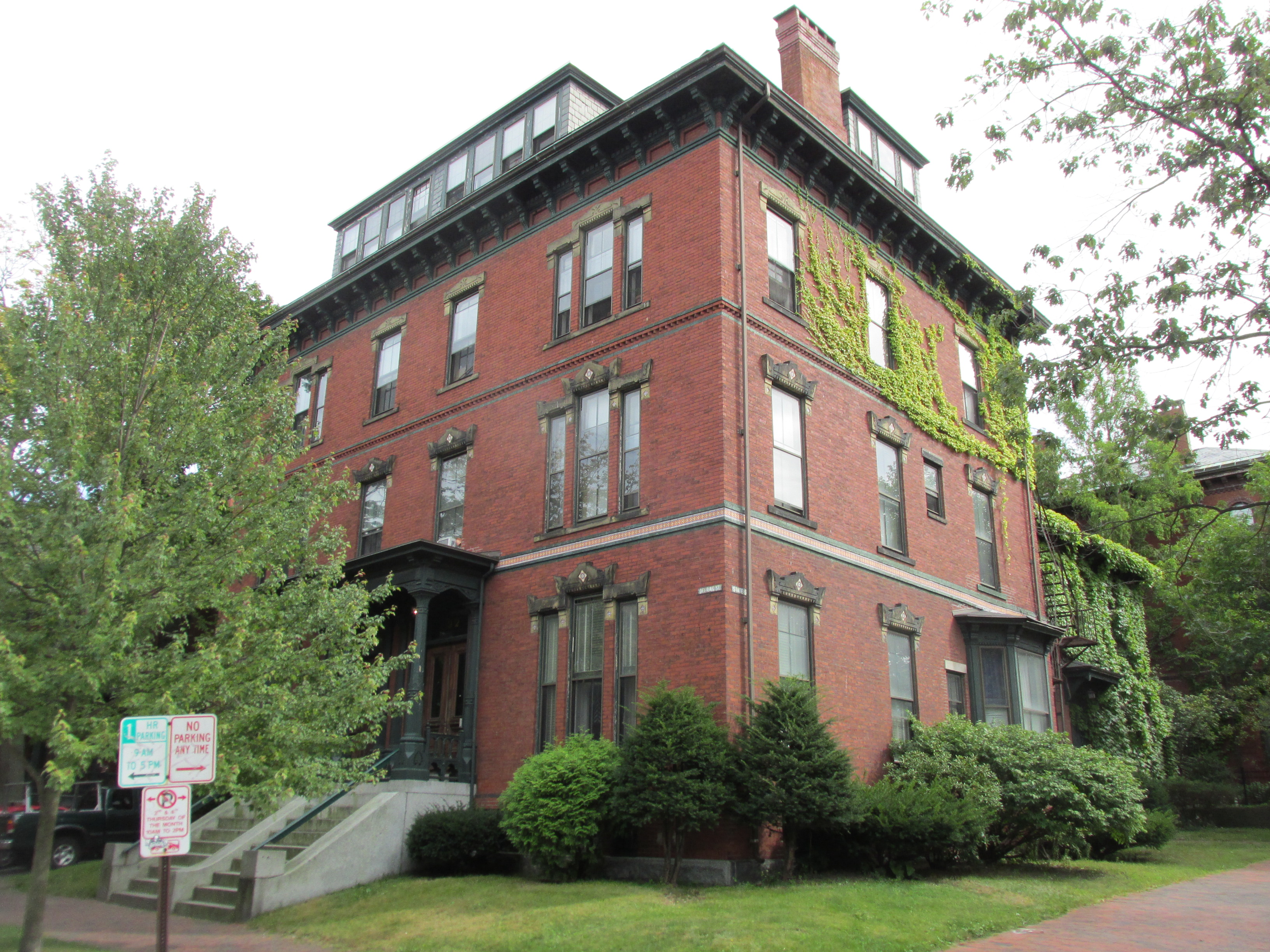
- Thomas B. Reed House

- Location within Maine Location within the United States
- Location: Portland, Maine
- Coordinates: 43°39′15″N 70°16′3″W
- Area: less than one acre
- Built: 1876
- Architect: Francis H. Fassett & Son; Simon H. Libby
- Architectural style: Late Victorian
- NRHP reference No.: 73000239

Significant dates
- Added to NRHP: May 7, 1973
- Designated NHL: May 15, 1975

The Thomas Brackett Reed House is a historic brick duplex house at 30–32 Deering Street in Portland, Maine. Built in 1876, the house was designated a National Historic Landmark in 1975 for its association with Thomas Brackett Reed (1839–1902), Speaker of the House of Representatives (1889–1891 and 1895–1899). Reed owned and occupied number 32 from 1888 until his death in 1902. He was notable for significantly increasing the power of the House Speaker, introducing a set of rules known as the Reed Rules that still govern debate in that body today.

== Description and history ==
The Reed House is set on the southeast corner of Deering Street and State Street, one block north of Longfellow Square in Portland's West End neighborhood. It is a 3 1/2-story brick building, with a symmetrically arranged facade facing Deering Street to the north. Matching entrances are located in the central bays, flanked on the outside by triple windows consisting of a tall and wide window with narrower and shorter flanking windows. This window style is repeated on the second and third level outer bays, with progressively simpler decorative stone and brickwork surrounds. The bays above the entrance have simpler sash windows with similar styling to the lintels and sills. Horizontal stringcourses of elaborate brickwork separate the levels. The main block of the house is topped by a hip roof, to which a wide shed-roof dormer was added in the 20th century. A two-story addition extends to the rear of the house, and there have been additional modest alterations to the rear since the period of Reed's ownership.

The house was designed by F. H. Fassett & Son and built in 1876, and is surrounded by similar fashionable residences of the period. Number 32 was purchased in 1888 by Thomas Brackett Reed, and remained his home until his death in 1902. Over about the same period, number 30 was owned by William L. Putnam, a lawyer and former mayor of Portland who was appointed to the federal bench in 1891.

Thomas Brackett Reed's importance in U.S. political history lies in fundamental changes he made to the operation of the United States House of Representatives during his tenure as its Speaker (1889–1891 and 1895–1899). Prior to his accession to that office, the body was run by procedures mainly set down in the early 19th century by Thomas Jefferson. They notably included the "disappearing quorum", in which opposition members would refuse to answer a quorum call, even though they were present in the chamber, and thus suspend activity. In 1890 Reed decisively broke this practice by directing the clerk to count members who were visibly present in the chamber. He then successfully introduced to the chamber a set of procedural changes known as the Reed Rules, which still influence the body's procedures today. These include granting the Speaker the right to reject dilatory motions and tactics at his sole discretion, and reduced the quorum to 100. When Democrats regained control of the House in 1892 they repealed his rules, but Reed was so effective in applying the disappearing quorum in opposition that his rules were reinstated.

== See also ==
- List of National Historic Landmarks in Maine
- National Register of Historic Places listings in Portland, Maine
