= Masonic Temple (Belfast, Maine) =

- U.S. National Register of Historic Places
- U.S. Historic district – Contributing property
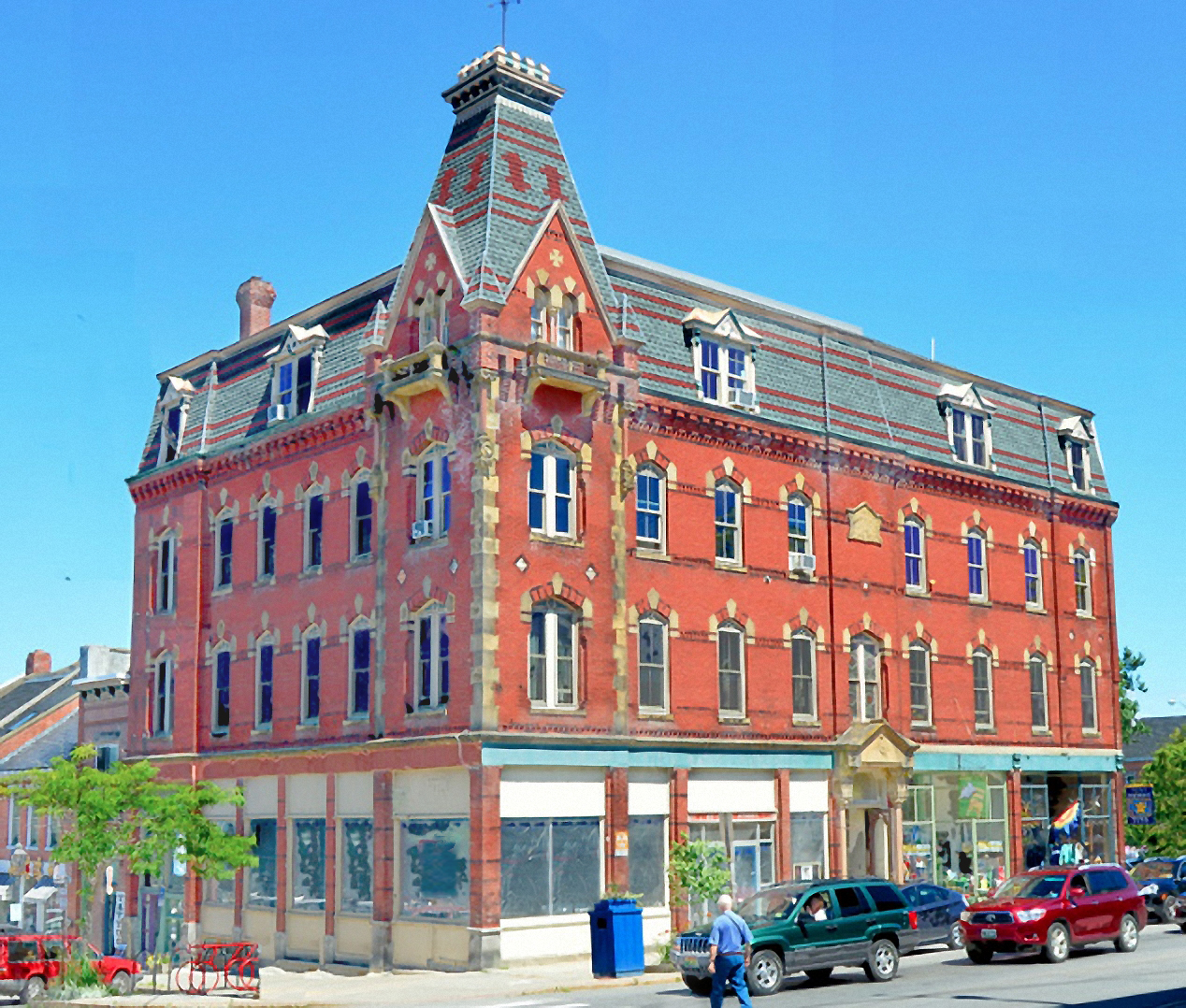

- Location within Maine Location within the United States
- Location: High and Main Sts., Belfast, Maine
- Coordinates: 44°25′34″N 69°0′24″W
- Area: less than one acre
- Built: 1877
- Architect: Multiple
- Part of: Belfast Commercial Historic District (ID80000257)
- NRHP reference No.: 73000246

Significant dates
- Added to NRHP: April 26, 1973
- Designated CP: April 4, 1980

The former Masonic Temple is a historic commercial and social building at Main and High Streets in downtown Belfast, Maine. Built in 1877, it is one of the city's most elaborately decorated buildings, featuring Masonic symbols. It was listed on the National Register of Historic Places in 1973. While there are active Masonic organizations in Belfast, they now meet in a modern facility on Wight Street.

== Description and history ==
Belfast's former Masonic Temple is located in the commercial heart of the city, at the northeast corner of Main and High Streets. It is a 3 1/2-story masonry structure, built out of red brick with stone trim, resting on a granite foundation. It is capped by a mansard roof, and has a four-story mansard-roofed tower prominently set at the street corner. The ground floor houses commercial storefronts, with the main entrance centered on the facade facing High Street, flanked by engaged columns and topped by an elaborate stone hood with brackets. Windows on the upper levels are set in segmented-arch openings, with keystones. The mansard roof is pierced by dormers with one or two sash windows, topped by small gables. The tower is crested by a small corniced battlement.

It includes a 40 by 46 feet (12 m × 14 m) lodge room, with a 21 feet (6.4 m) ceiling, filling the third and fourth floors on the south side of the building.

The first Masonic organization in Belfast, the Phoenix Lodge, was founded in 1817. By 1875 there were four organization, whose meetings were held in a hall in the old High School on Church street. That building was destroyed by fire in 1875, prompting the construction of this building. The land was purchased in 1877, and the building erected the following year. It was designed by George M. Harding of Boston, Massachusetts.

In 1995, the Masonic Temple Association sold the building, and Belfast Lodge #24 moved to a new building on Wight Street.

== See also ==
- National Register of Historic Places listings in Waldo County, Maine
