= Lovell, Maine =

Town in Maine, United States

- Town
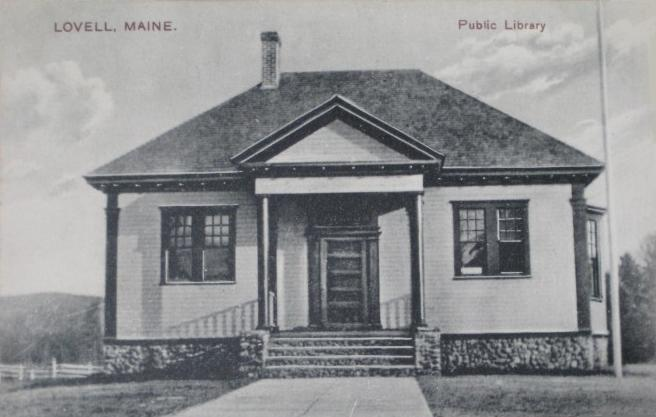
- Charlotte Hobbs Memorial Library

- Seal

- Location within Maine Location within the United States
- Coordinates: 44°11′29″N 70°52′45″W
- Country: United States
- State: Maine
- County: Oxford
- Incorporated: 1800
- Named for: Captain John Lovewell

Area
  - Total: 47.89 sq mi (124.03 km^{2})
  - Land: 43.15 sq mi (111.76 km^{2})
  - Water: 4.74 sq mi (12.28 km^{2})
- Elevation: 433 ft (132 m)

Population (2020)
  - Total: 1,104
  - Density: 26/sq mi (9.9/km^{2})
- Time zone: UTC-5 (Eastern (EST))
  - Summer (DST): UTC-4 (EDT)
- ZIP Codes: 04051 (Lovell); 04016 (Center Lovell)
- Area code: 207
- FIPS code: 23-41365
- GNIS feature ID: 582568
- Website: www.lovellmaine.org

Lovell is a town in Oxford County, Maine, United States. The population was 1,104 at the 2020 census. Lovell is the site of Kezar Lake, a resort area.

== History ==
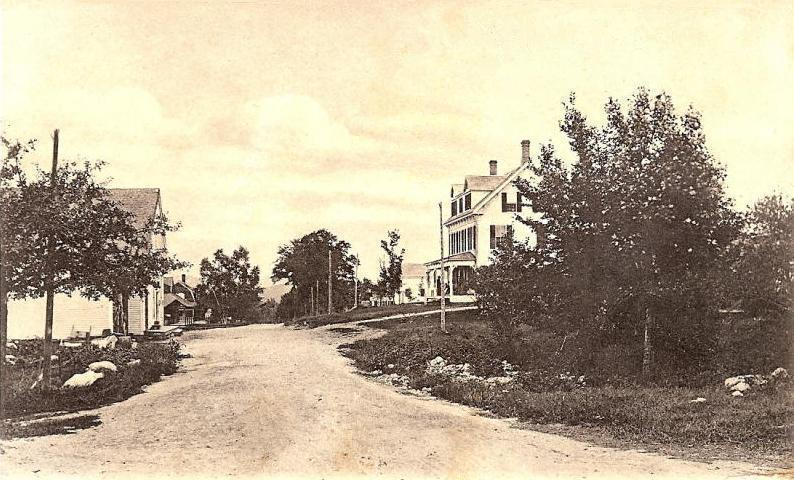
Main Street in 1907

In 1774, the Massachusetts General Court granted New Suncook Plantation to the officers and soldiers (or their heirs) who fought on May 8, 1725, during Father Rale's War against the Sokokis Abenaki Indians at Pequawket (now Fryeburg). First settled in 1777, the community had 85 inhabitants by 1790. New Suncook Plantation would be incorporated as a town on November 15, 1800, renamed after Captain John Lovewell, the fallen expedition leader.

The Kezar River provided water power for industry. In the 19th century, mills produced spools, long lumber, shooks, axe handles, ox goads, carriages, sleighs, harness, cabinet work and coffins, and boots and shoes. Good soil helped farms prosper. Following the Civil War, the Portland and Ogdensburg Railroad connected to Fryeburg, and tourists discovered the beauty of Kezar Lake. Inns and hotels opened, and the town remains a summer resort.

In 2015 an estimated 100-year-old wild American chestnut tree was found in a reserved forest in Lovell, on land bequeathed to the University of Maine Foundation. The tree stood 117 feet (36 m) tall and a skinny 16.1 inches (41 cm) in diameter. It is thought to be the largest American chestnut in the United States.

== Geography ==
According to the United States Census Bureau, the town has a total area of 47.89 square miles (124.03 km^{2}), of which 43.15 square miles (111.76 km^{2}) is land and 4.74 square miles (12.28 km^{2}) is water. Lovell is drained by the Kezar River, a tributary of the Saco River. Kezar Lake is a significant lake within the town.

Lovell is crossed by State Route 5. It borders the towns of Stoneham to the north, Waterford to the east, Sweden to the southeast, Fryeburg to the southwest, and Stow to the west.

=== Kezar Lake ===
Kezar Lake
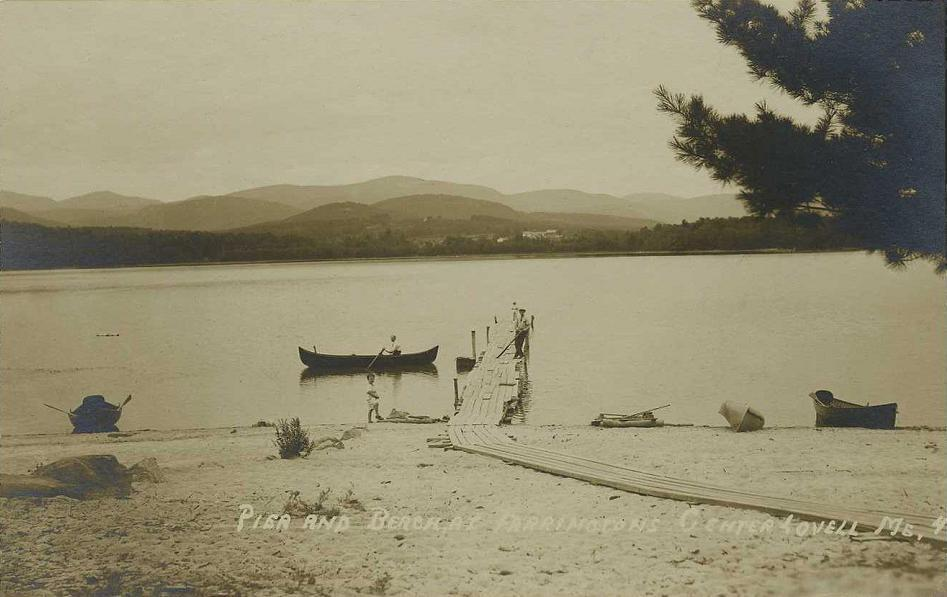
- Pier and beach at Farrington's Hotel in c. 1920

- Location within Maine
- Location: Oxford County, Maine
- Coordinates: 44°11′N 70°54′W
- Primary inflows: Great Brook; Mill Brook
- Primary outflows: Kezar Outlet
- Basin countries: United States
- Max. length: 7 mi (11 km)
- Max. width: 1 mi (1.6 km)
- Surface area: 2,665 acres (1,078 ha)
- Max. depth: 155 feet (47 m)
- Water volume: 87,835 acre⋅ft (108,343,000 m^{3})
- Surface elevation: 377 ft (115 m)

Kezar Lake serves as a good habitat for smallmouth bass, white perch, chain pickerel, rainbow smelt, lake trout, and land-locked Atlantic salmon. There is a public boat launch area at the northern end of the lake in North Lovell, and another at the narrows south of Center Lovell.

=== Climate ===
This climatic region is typified by large seasonal temperature differences, with warm to hot (and often humid) summers and cold (sometimes severely cold) winters. According to the Köppen Climate Classification system, Lovell has a humid continental climate, abbreviated "Dfb" on climate maps.

== Demographics ==
Historical population
Census	Pop.	Note	%±
1810	365		—
1820	430		17.8%
1830	697		62.1%
1840	941		35.0%
1850	1,193		26.8%
1860	1,339		12.2%
1870	1,018		−24.0%
1880	1,077		5.8%
1890	853		−20.8%
1900	693		−18.8%
1910	668		−3.6%
1920	575		−13.9%
1930	645		12.2%
1940	647		0.3%
1950	640		−1.1%
1960	588		−8.1%
1970	607		3.2%
1980	767		26.4%
1990	888		15.8%
2000	974		9.7%
2010	1,140		17.0%
2020	1,104		−3.2%
U.S. Decennial Census

=== 2010 census ===
As of the census of 2010, there were 1,140 people, 477 households, and 339 families living in the town. The population density was 26.4 inhabitants per square mile (10.2/km^{2}). There were 1,227 housing units at an average density of 28.4 per square mile (11.0/km^{2}). The racial makeup of the town was 97.4% White, 0.4% African American, 0.3% Native American, 0.4% Asian, 0.1% Pacific Islander, 0.1% from other races, and 1.5% from two or more races. Hispanic or Latino of any race were 0.9% of the population.

There were 477 households, of which 28.1% had children under the age of 18 living with them, 59.7% were married couples living together, 8.4% had a female householder with no husband present, 2.9% had a male householder with no wife present, and 28.9% were non-families. 25.4% of all households were made up of individuals, and 11.5% had someone living alone who was 65 years of age or older. The average household size was 2.39 and the average family size was 2.83.

The median age in the town was 49.8 years. 21.9% of residents were under the age of 18; 4.7% were between the ages of 18 and 24; 15.6% were from 25 to 44; 38.3% were from 45 to 64; and 19.5% were 65 years of age or older. The gender makeup of the town was 48.7% male and 51.3% female.

=== 2000 census ===
As of the census of 2000, there were 974 people, 393 households, and 275 families living in the town. The population density was 22.6 inhabitants per square mile (8.7/km^{2}). There were 1,218 housing units at an average density of 28.2 per square mile (10.9/km^{2}). The racial makeup of the town was 98.97% White, 0.10% African American, 0.21% Asian, 0.10% from other races, and 0.62% from two or more races. Hispanic or Latino of any race were 0.92% of the population.

There were 393 households, out of which 29.0% had children under the age of 18 living with them, 58.5% were married couples living together, 6.4% had a female householder with no husband present, and 29.8% were non-families. 23.2% of all households were made up of individuals, and 8.4% had someone living alone who was 65 years of age or older. The average household size was 2.48 and the average family size was 2.92.

In the town, the population was spread out, with 24.0% under the age of 18, 5.0% from 18 to 24, 25.8% from 25 to 44, 29.7% from 45 to 64, and 15.5% who were 65 years of age or older. The median age was 43 years. For every 100 females, there were 102.5 males. For every 100 females age 18 and over, there were 107.9 males.

The median income for a household in the town was $33,365, and the median income for a family was $40,833. Males had a median income of $29,375 versus $22,279 for females. The per capita income for the town was $17,089. About 8.7% of families and 12.4% of the population were below the poverty line, including 13.1% of those under age 18 and 9.8% of those age 65 or over.

== Town Libraries ==
With approximately 1,100 residents Lovell, Maine has two publicly funded libraries. The Charlotte Hobbs Memorial Library and the Lewis Dana Hill Memorial Library.

Charlotte Hobbs Memorial Library

The Charlotte Hobbs Memorial Library was opened in 1908 as the Lovell Public Library. In 1969 the Library Club dedicated Lovell Public Library to Charlotte Hobbs after her death. In 1899 the Women's Library Club of Lovell was founded by Mrs. Frank Swett and Miss Susan Walker, this was done due to the Maine State Library sending trunks of books as a traveling library. In 1901 the Women's Library Club of Lovell was officially incorporated. Charlotte Hobbs was born in Lovell, Maine in 1879. She graduated Wellesley College in 1902, returning to Lovell after to teach, tutor, collect historical materials, and wanted to create a public library for the town. She was the town historian and served as the Lovell Public Library Librarian for more than 50 years. She put on and ran drama productions that helped raise funding for the Lovell Public Library. The dramas helped raise the funds to buy the land and construct the library building. The lot was purchased in 1906 after a fire destroyed the existing building, in 1908 the building was completed and the Lovell Public Library opened. Charlotte Hobbs was able to celebrate the 50th anniversary of the library she helped build in 1951. In 1975 renovations were able to be completed and paid for by the Charlotte Hobbs's legacy. In 1976 the fundraising changed from drama series to an Arts & Artisan Fair that continues to run annually. 2001 the Charlotte Hobbs Memorial Library celebrated their 100-year anniversary of incorporation. The next round of funds for renovations and expansions were raised with the help of author, Stephen King, who did a fan reading. In 2010 the newly renovated and expanded building reopened its doors.

The Charlotte Hobbs Memorial Library hosts many events, such as Author Talks, where they have many well-known authors speak to their community.

The Charlotte Hobbs Memorial Library has a collection size of 16,456 volumes and circulates over 21,000 transactions annually. The current director is Jennifer Dupree and the library is opened 6 days a week all year long.

Lewis Dana Hill Memorial Library

The Lewis Dana Hill Memorial library is a small library that is located in the old one-room schoolhouse in North Lovell, Maine.

The North Lovell Library was originally founded and opened in 1945, it was located across the street from the current location, in a room in the Kezar Lake Grange Hall and was a focal for the summer residents that came to the lake. In 1966 the one-room schoolhouse was purchased and the North Lovell Library was moved.

The North Lovell Library was renamed the Lewis Dana Hill Memorial Library after Lewis Dana Hill who was a summer resident of Lovell for more than 50 years. He was a Harvard graduate and frequented the library throughout his summers in Lovell.

The library is funded through public funds and many library fundraisers. There is an annual Fourth of July Book and Yard Sale, community breakfasts, and author lecture talks.

The Lewis Dana Hill Memorial Library functions similarly to when it was opened. There are no library cards needed, it is open to the public without it. Materials are checked out and managed using card catalog systems and sorted using the Dewey Decimal System. The one room is sectioned based on the materials. There is a small children's section with stacks close to floor level for children to easily browse. WiFi was installed due to resident requests, but remains the only "newly modern" update to the library. The community residents enjoy sitting at the library to read their materials.

The Lewis Dana Hill Memorial Library contains 9,250 volumes and circulates approximately 1,800 transaction. The current director is Dennis Hodge. The Lewis Dana Hill Memorial Library is open two days a week in the off-season, when the population grows in the summer they are opened three days with expanded hours.

== Sites of interest ==
- The Brick Church for the Performing Arts
- Lovell Historical Society & Museum
- Sucker Brook Preserve

== Notable people ==
- Abraham D. Andrews, politician and physician
- Abraham A. Barker, US congressman
- Marsden Hartley, painter, poet, and essayist
- Eastman Johnson, artist
- Moses Kilgore (1817–1890), Wisconsin state legislator, shipbuilder, and businessman
- Charles H. Kimball, architect
- Stephen King, writer
- Heather Masse, musician
- Marcellus Stearns, 11th governor of Florida (buried in Center Lovell Cemetery)
- Rudy Vallee, singer
- Moira Yip, linguist
