= Gerald Hotel =

- U.S. National Register of Historic Places
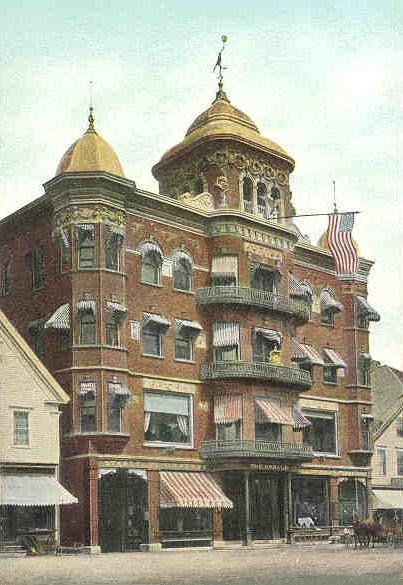
- Postcard view of hotel, 1905

- Location within Maine Location within the United States
- Location: 151-157 Main St., Fairfield, Maine
- Coordinates: 44°35′13″N 69°35′43″W
- Area: 0.6 acres (0.24 ha)
- Built: 1899
- Architect: William R. Miller
- Architectural style: Renaissance Revival
- NRHP reference No.: 12000894
- Added to NRHP: March 25, 2013

The Gerald Hotel is a former hotel building at 151–157 Main Street in the center of Fairfield, Maine, United States. It was designed by William R. Miller for Amos F. Gerald, one of Maine's leading businessmen of the late 19th century, and built in 1899–1900. It is a striking Renaissance Revival structure, with a sophistication of design and decoration not normally found in rural Maine, and is one of the town's largest buildings. It was listed on the National Register of Historic Places in 2013.

== Description and history ==
The Gerald Hotel building is set on the west side of Main Street in the village center of Fairfield, a short way south of the junction of Maine State Route 100 and United States Route 201. The four story brick and terracotta building towers over nearby buildings, which range in height from one to three stories. The main facade is decorated with terracotta trim elements, and is divided into five sections: projecting polygonal corner bays and a central projecting bay flank flat sections. The central bay is supported by iron columns on the first floor, and rises to the fourth. It has rounded corners, with windows at the corners and the center, except for the ground level, where the projection shelters the recessed main entrance. The bay supports rest on a solid slab of granite that was reported to be the largest quarried in Maine at the time. This bay originally had an elaborate rooftop pavilion (visible in the 1905 postcard view); this was removed in the mid-20th century. The flanking flat bays each have paired windows on the upper level (each level having different decorative treatment), and plate glass windows at the ground level. The left corner bay has a carriage entrance at the ground level, with the projecting polygonal bay above. The rightmost bay has a plate glass window at the ground level.

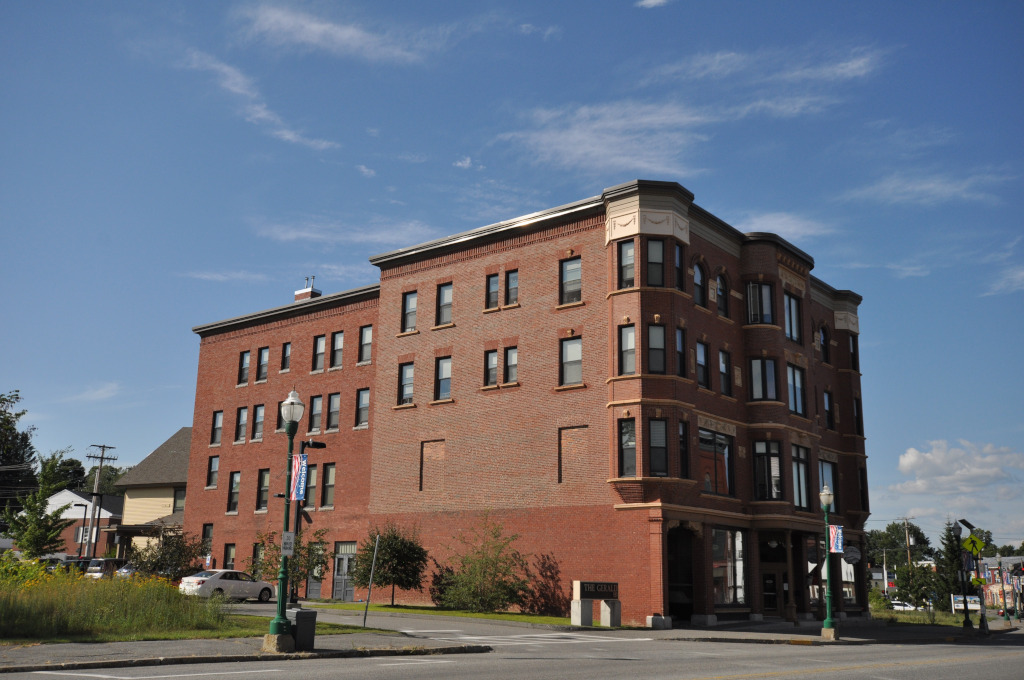
The hotel in 2022

The hotel was designed by Lewiston architect William R. Miller and built in 1899-1900 for Amos F. Gerald (1841-1913), one of Maine's leading businessmen. Gerald was born in nearby Benton, and invested in a large number of businesses in Maine, including electric trolley systems in several areas, industrial mills, and amusement parks. He built the state's first electrical power station in Fairfield, and promoted electrification across the state. The elaborate design of the Gerald Hotel was typical of Gerald's buildings, which were intended to be objects of curiosity. Gerald was a longtime Fairfield resident; his house, also a Miller design, is also listed on the National Register.

The Gerald Hotel operated for 35 years, with commercial businesses on the ground floor, and was a major gathering point for social and civic events. From an early date, one of the storefronts was occupied by Lawrie Furniture, which occupied the space until 1963 and was the major furniture retailer in the area. The upper floors were converted into apartments in the 1940s. The building underwent rehabilitation in 2015, and now serves as an apartment building for seniors.

== See also ==
- National Register of Historic Places listings in Somerset County, Maine
