= Skowhegan Fire Station =

- U.S. National Register of Historic Places
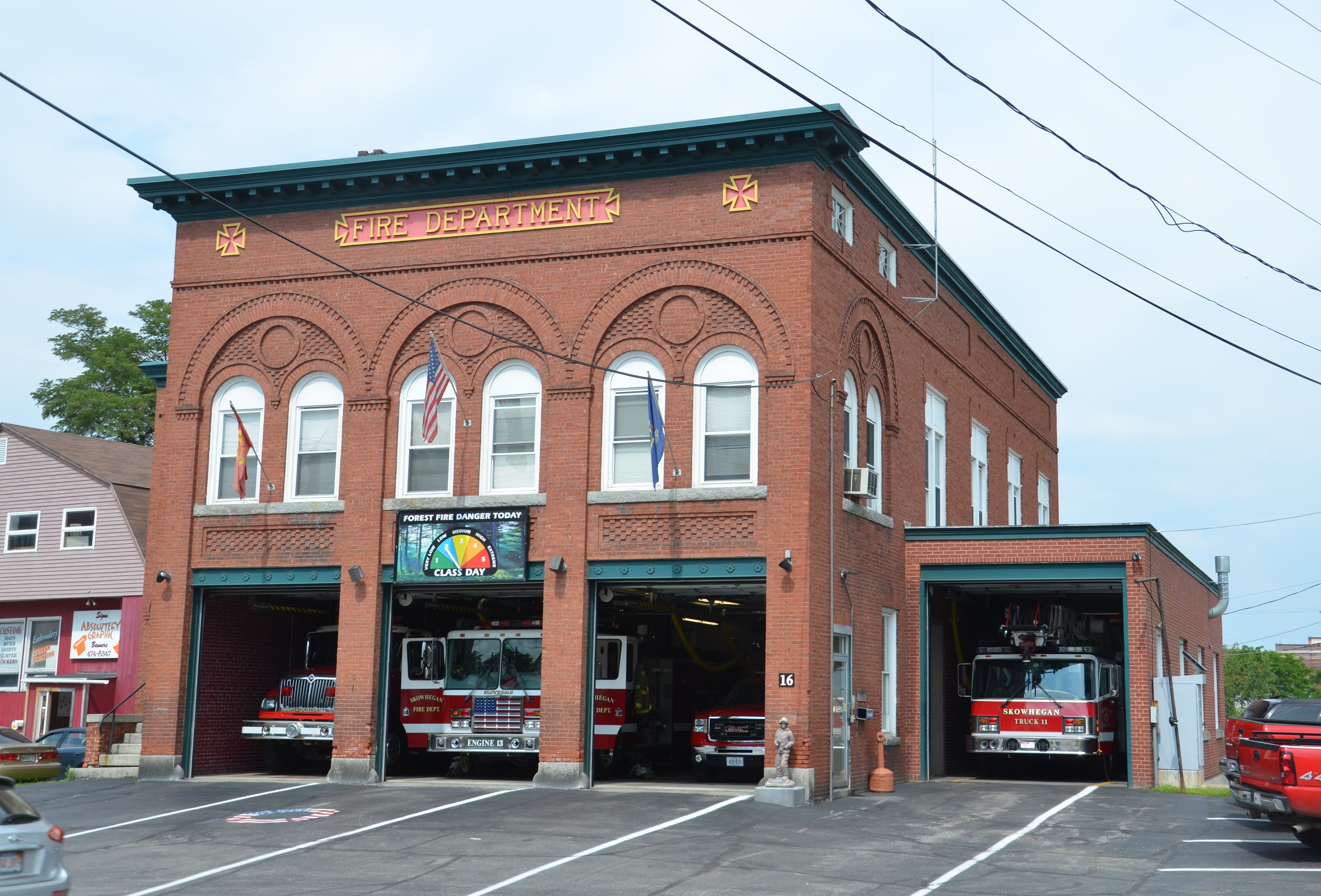

- Location within Maine Location within the United States
- Location: 16 Island Avenue, Skowhegan, Maine
- Coordinates: 44°45′50″N 69°43′9″W
- Area: 0.3 acres (0.12 ha)
- Built: 1904
- Architect: William R. Miller
- Architectural style: Romanesque
- NRHP reference No.: 83003679
- Added to NRHP: October 20, 1983

The Skowhegan Fire Station is located at 16 Island Avenue in the center of Skowhegan, Maine. The fire station, built in 1904 to a design by William R. Miller, is one of the state's finest Romanesque Revival fire houses. It was added to the National Register of Historic Places on October 20, 1983.

== Description and history ==
The Skowhegan Fire Station is centrally located in the town center of Skowhegan, on an island in the center of the Kennebec River, joined to the rest of the town by Island Avenue, designated United States Route 2 and United States Route 201. Set on the north side of the road, it is a roughly square 2-1/2 story brick structure, with three original vehicle bays, and a fourth added on to the right in a modern single-story addition. The main block bays are highlighted by brickwork arches that rise to including paired round-arch windows at the second level, which have a raised brickwork field with a round brick panel at its center. A tall entablature includes terra cotta signage identifying the building with flanking broadfoot crosses.

The building was designed by the noted Lewiston architect William R. Miller, whose other public works include the L. C. Bates Museum and the Lawrence Library, both in Fairfileld. The building is a well-executed example of the Romanesque Revival executed in brick.

At the end of February 2024, The Skowhegan Fire department moved out of the 120 year old station to a new public safety complex on East Madison Road.

== See also ==
- National Register of Historic Places listings in Somerset County, Maine
