= Skowhegan Branch =

Railway line in Maine

Skowhegan branch

Overview
- Owner: Pan Am Railways

History
- Opened: February 1855

Technical
- Line length: 9 mi (14 km)
- Track gauge: 1,435 mm (4 ft 8 1/2 in) standard gauge

The Skowhegan branch, also known as the Hinckley branch, is a railway line in the state of Maine. It runs approximately 9 miles (14 km) from Fairfield, Maine, to Hinckley, Maine. It was built by the Somerset and Kennebec Railroad in 1855–1856 and formerly continued north to Skowhegan, Maine. Pan Am Railways, a subsidiary of CSX Transportation, owns and operates the line.

== History ==
The Somerset and Kennebec Railroad was chartered on August 10, 1848. The Kennebec and Portland Railroad was opened to Augusta, Maine, on December 29, 1851. Construction of the Somerset and Kennebec Railroad north from Augusta began in 1853, following the Kennebec River. It, like the Kennebec and Portland, was standard gauge. The line briefly opened between Augusta and Kendall's Mills (now Fairfield) in February 1855, and was then closed until June of that year to repair frost damage. (Note: Peters states that the line opened to Waterville in 1853.) The formal opening of the line to Skowhegan, Maine, took place on January 27, 1857. (Note: Peters gives a completion date of November 19, 1856.) The Portland and Kennebec Railroad, successor to the Kennebec and Portland Railroad, leased the Somerset and Kennebec Railroad on January 1, 1864.

At the same time, the Penobscot and Kennebec Railroad was building a 5 ft 6 in (1,676 mm) line from Waterville northeast to Bangor, Maine. This line was completed in 1855. The Penobscot and Kennebec Railroad was consolidated with the Androscoggin and Kennebec Railroad in 1862 to form the Maine Central Railroad. The Maine Central leased both the Portland and Kennebec and Somerset and Kennebec in 1871 and converted to standard gauge. This left the line to Skowhegan as a branch, splitting off from the main line at Waterville. The total length from Waterville to Skowhegan was 18.2 miles (29.3 km). The southern end of the branch was truncated to Fairfield in 1918 with the opening of a new bridge across the Kennebec between Fairfield, and Benton, Maine, and the abandonment of the former Penobscot and Kennebec main line between Waterville and Benton on the east bank of the river.

In 1921, passenger service on the Skowhegan branch consisted of four daily round-trips. One of these continued to Portland, Maine, and carried through coaches for Boston, Massachusetts. In 1933, most of the passenger trains were replaced with buses. Passenger service ended in 1946.

The Maine Central abandoned the branch north of Shawmut, Maine, in 1971. Guilford Transportation Industries, later Pan Am Railways, acquired the Maine Central in 1981. Pan Am Railways became a subsidiary of CSX Transportation in 2022.
