= Good Will-Hinckley =

- Hinckley Good Will Home Historic District
- U.S. National Register of Historic Places
- U.S. Historic district
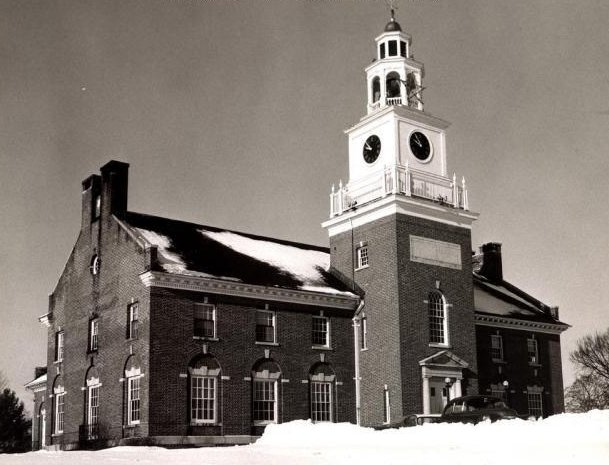
- 1916 photo of the Prescott Administration Building

- Location within Maine Location within the United States
- Location: US 201, Hinckley, Maine
- Area: 525 acres (212 ha)
- Built: 1889
- Architect: Wilfred E. Mansur (Moody Chapel, 1897); William R. Miller (Moody Hall, 1905–06); Edward Josselyn (Prescott Administration building, 1916); Albert Randolph Ross (Carnegie Library, 1906-07)
- Architectural style: Colonial Revival, Queen Anne
- NRHP reference No.: 87000232
- Added to NRHP: January 9, 1987

Good Will-Hinckley is a charitable organization in Fairfield, Maine. Organized in 1889 by George W. Hinckley, the membership-driven organization is dedicated to educating youth and changing lives. It has a campus of more than 600 acres (240 ha) in Fairfield, on which it operates the Maine Academy of Natural Sciences, a boarding and day school focused on agricultural and outdoor education, and the Glenn Stratton Learning Center, a day treatment school focused on children with social, emotional, and behavioral challenges. It is also home to the L. C. Bates Museum, one of the oldest natural history museums in Maine. They also provide residential services for the Maine Academy of Natural Sciences, College students, Transitional Living students and residential treatment youth.

== History ==
The Good Will Home Association was organized in 1889 by George Walter Hinckley, a native of Guilford, Connecticut, who trained both for the ministry and as a teacher. As a young man he was impressed by the changes effected in under-privileged and troubled youth when given a suitably nurturing environment, and to this end he established a home on a 125-acre (51 ha) farm in the northeastern part of Fairfield, Maine, a rural community in southern Somerset. Hinckley traveled widely to raise funds for the Good Will School, and had by his death in 1950 grown the campus to 3,000 acres (1,200 ha) and 45 buildings, and served more than 3,000 underprivileged and needy youth.

Sometime thereafter the organization, then operating as the Hinckley School, began marketing itself as a college preparatory school, similar to Phillips Exeter Academy and Tabor Academy. The Maine Attorney General sued the organization, which in 1970 was found to be operating outside its chartered purpose, and was given three years to return to that purpose. This was addressed in part by enlarging the organization's charter to include a broader range of educational activities. The school suspended operation in 2009 after state funding for boarding facilities of the sort it provided were reallocated to home-based treatments for at-risk youth, leaving only a day treatment program. The subsequent reorganization consumed part of the organization's endowment and forced the sale of 680 acres (280 ha) of its campus. Currently they are serving youth from all over the State of Maine, providing educational opportunities and residential care.

== Organization ==
Good Will-Hinckley is the operating name of the Good Will Home Association, a nonprofit member-driven organization dedicated to propagating Hinckley's legacy. The organization operates five programs from its campus (now just 600 acres (240 ha)): The Maine Academy of Natural Sciences, a secondary charter school for students who do not thrive in traditional academic settings, the Glenn Stratton Learning Center, a day treatment center for children with a focus on social, emotional and behavioral challenges, the L. C. Bates Museum of natural history, Roundel Residential Treatment program engages youth that are experiencing significant social, emotional and behavioral challenges and need supportive housing and treatment, and College Step Up and Transitional Living program provides year round housing and support for youth attending College or in need of a supportive environment to secure employment as well as stable housing and network development. The organization provides on-campus housing for Maine Academy of Natural Sciences students who live too far away, and for those who require an alternative home environment.

== Campus ==
Good Will-Hinckley's campus is located in northeastern Fairfield, on the west side of United States Route 201, on either side of Martin Stream, with what was historically the girls campus on the north side and the boys campus on the south side. The historic core of the campus, some 525 acres (212 ha) that include all of its buildings built between 1889 and 1930, was listed on the National Register of Historic Places in 1987. The campus includes a number of architect-designed residence cottages, spread out along Page Terrace, along with several other architecturally distinguished buildings. The 1897 Moody Chapel was designed by Wilfred E. Mansur of Bangor, Moody School (1905–06) was designed by William R. Miller of Lewiston, and the Prescott Administration building (1916) was designed by New York City architect Edward Josselyn. New York architect Albert Randolph Ross designed by 1906-07 Carnegie Library, built with funding support from Andrew Carnegie. Josselyn also designed the 1919 woodworking shop, and Miller was responsible for the Romanesque Revival building housing the L. C. Bates Museum.

== See also ==
- National Register of Historic Places listings in Somerset County, Maine
