= Brian L. Buker =

United States Army Medal of Honor recipient (1949–1970)

Brian Leroy Buker
- Medal of Honor
- Born: November 3, 1949; Benton, Maine, U.S.
- Died: April 5, 1970 (aged 20); Châu Đốc, Republic of Vietnam
- Burial place: Brown Cemetery, Benton, Maine
- Military career
- Allegiance: United States of America
- Branch: United States Army
- Service years: 1968–1970
- Rank: Sergeant
- Units: Detachment B-55, 5th Special Forces Group
- Conflicts: Vietnam War †
- Awards: Medal of Honor; Bronze Star; Purple Heart; Gallantry Cross (Vietnam)

Brian Leroy Buker (November 3, 1949 – April 5, 1970) was a United States Army soldier and a recipient of the United States military's highest decoration—the Medal of Honor—for his actions in the Vietnam War.

== Biography ==
Buker was born on November 3, 1949, in Benton, Maine, the youngest of four sons of Opal Buker Clark. He grew up in Benton and graduated from Lawrence High School in nearby Fairfield in 1967. His brothers, Victor, Gerald, and Alan, also served in the Vietnam War.

Buker joined the Army from Bangor, Maine in 1968, and by April 5, 1970, was serving as a sergeant in Detachment B-55, 5th Special Forces Group, 1st Special Forces. On that day, he was acting as a platoon advisor for a Vietnamese mobile strike force company on a mission in Chau Doc Province, Republic of Vietnam. When his platoon came under intense fire, he single-handedly destroyed one enemy bunker, was seriously wounded, and then destroyed another bunker despite these wounds. He was killed later in the battle as he reorganized his soldiers.

For these actions, Buker was posthumously awarded the Medal of Honor. He was one of three people from Maine to receive the medal in Vietnam, the others being Thomas J. McMahon and Donald Sidney Skidgel. His other decorations include a Bronze Star, Purple Heart, and Vietnamese Gallantry Cross. On September 15, 2010, Buker's family donated his Medal of Honor and other decorations to his alma mater, Lawrence High School in Fairfield, for display.

Buker, aged 20 at his death, was buried at Brown Cemetery in his hometown of Benton.

In 2018 the Maine State Prison named their American Legion Post after Buker.

== Medal of Honor citation ==
Sergeant Buker's official Medal of Honor citation reads:

For conspicuous gallantry and intrepidity in action at the risk of life above and beyond the call of duty. Sgt. Buker, Detachment B-55, distinguished himself while serving as a platoon adviser of a Vietnamese mobile strike force company during an offensive mission. Sgt. Buker personally led the platoon, cleared a strategically located well-guarded pass, and established the first foothold at the top of what had been an impenetrable mountain fortress. When the platoon came under the intense fire from a determined enemy located in 2 heavily fortified bunkers, and realizing that withdrawal would result in heavy casualties, Sgt. Buker unhesitatingly, and with complete disregard for his personal safety, charged through the hail of enemy fire and destroyed the first bunker with hand grenades. While reorganizing his men for the attack on the second bunker, Sgt. Buker was seriously wounded. Despite his wounds and the deadly enemy fire, he crawled forward and destroyed the second bunker. Sgt. Buker refused medical attention and was reorganizing his men to continue the attack when he was mortally wounded. As a direct result of his heroic actions, many casualties were averted, and the assault of the enemy position was successful. Sgt. Buker's extraordinary heroism at the cost of his life are in the highest traditions of the military service and reflect great credit on him, his unit, and the U.S. Army.

== See also ==
- List of Medal of Honor recipients for the Vietnam War
