= Jordan School =

- U.S. National Register of Historic Places
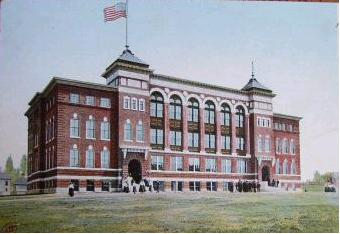
- Postcard view, 1908

- Location within Maine Location within the United States
- Location: 35 Wood St., Lewiston, Maine
- Coordinates: 44°06′03″N 70°12′33″W
- Built: 1902
- Architect: William R. Miller
- Architectural style: Renaissance
- NRHP reference No.: 84001355
- Added to NRHP: March 22, 1984

The Jordan School is a historic school building at 35 Wood Street in Lewiston, Maine. Built in 1902, it is an important local example of Italian Renaissance architecture, designed by the architect William R. Miller. It served as the city's first purpose-built high school, and has been converted to residential use. It was listed on the National Register of Historic Places in 1984.

== Description and history ==
The former Jordan School building stands on the southeast side of Wood Street, in a residential area between the city's commercial downtown and the Bates College campus. It occupies a lot that spans all the way to Nichols Street, with its principal facade facing a parking lot to the southwest. It is a three-story masonry structure, built out of brick with granite trim. The main facade is fourteen bays wide, divided into three sections separated by slightly projecting entry and stair houses. The outer sections are three bays wide, with keystoned sash windows on the first two floors. The projecting sections, two bays wide, have entrances recessed in Romanesque round-arch openings. The center section is the most elaborate, with paired windows separated by pilasters on the second and third floors, topped by rounded arches above. This section has a higher roofline than the outer wings, joining the pyramid-roofed projecting sections.

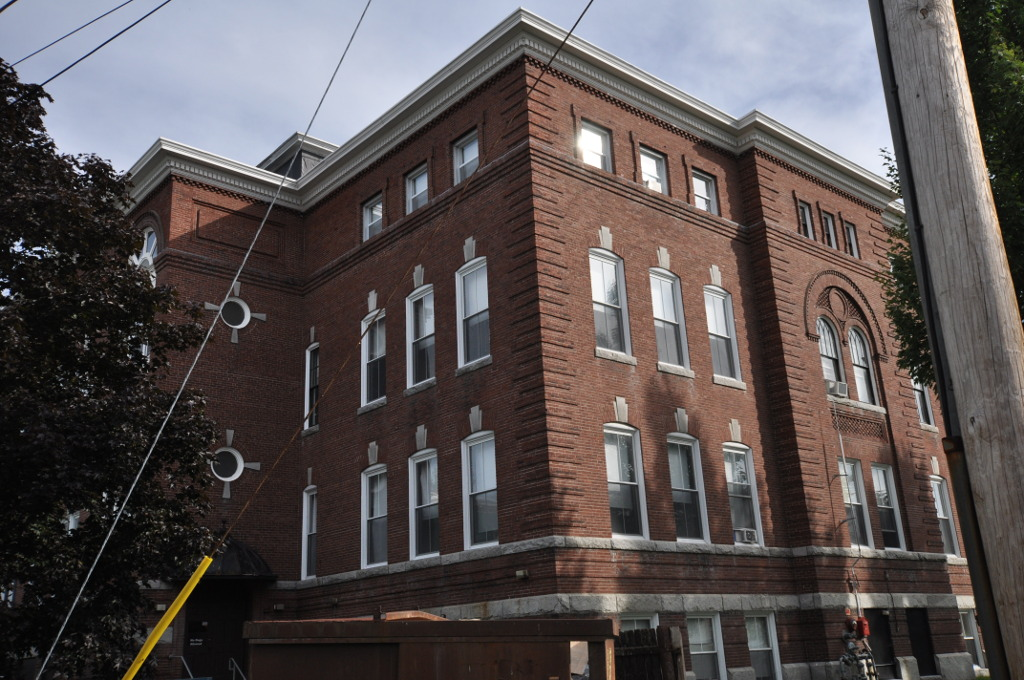
The school in 2014

The city's high school was founded in 1850, and originally met at a site now occupied by the Dingley Building. In 1859 it moved to a building in Main Street. In 1902, this school was built, becoming the first dedicated home to the high school. In 1931, the high school was moved to a new facility, and this became a junior high school, serving in that role until 1983. The building was then converted to apartments. The school was named for Lyman G. Jordan, principal of the first high school for 15 years, Bates College professor of chemistry and biology, and member of the Lewiston school board.

The building continues to serve as an apartment building today.

== See also ==
- National Register of Historic Places listings in Androscoggin County, Maine
