= Amos F. Gerald =

- Born: September 12, 1842; Benton, Maine, U.S.
- Died: June 14, 1913 (aged 70); Portland, Maine, U.S.
- Resting place: Maplewood Cemetery, Fairfield, Maine, U.S.
- Occupation: Railroad engineer
- Spouse: Caroline W. Rowell (m. 1867)

Amos Fitz Gerald (September 12, 1842 – June 14, 1913) was a railroad engineer from Maine, United States. He was nicknamed the "Electric Railway King" of the state due to his building 125 miles of Maine's early railroads.

== Life and career ==
Gerald was born in 1842 in Benton, Maine, to a farming family. The family's surname was previously Fitzgerald but was shortened to Gerald after his great-grandfather's immigration from Ireland. Amos was given the middle name of Fitz, though he preferred to use the initial.

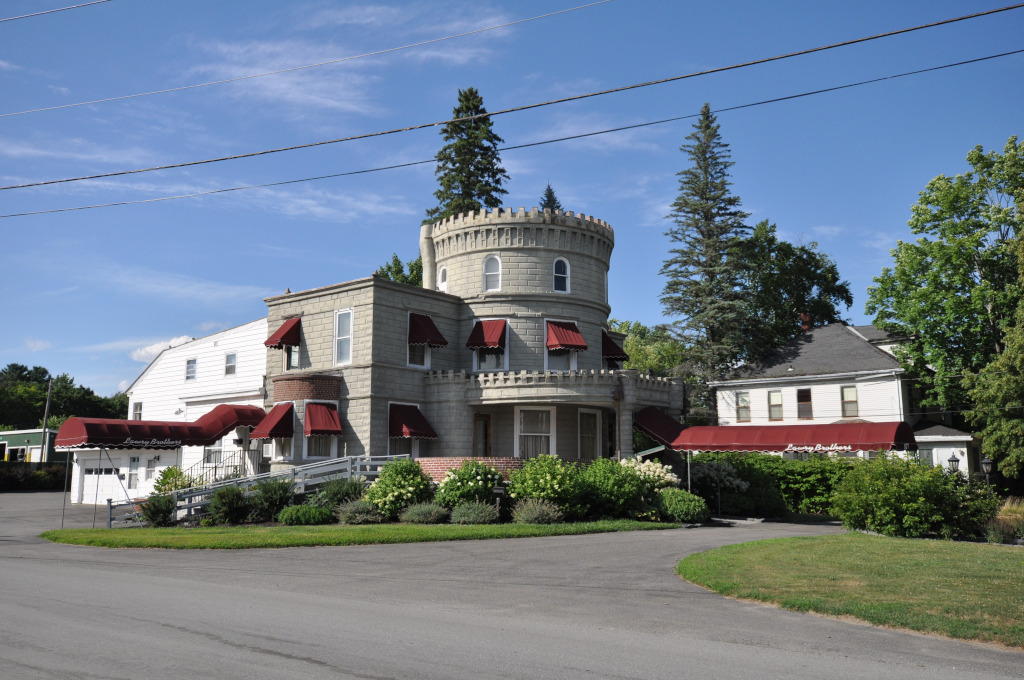
The Amos Gerald House in Fairfield, Maine

In 1860, aged eighteen, he left Benton for New Hampshire, where he became a log driver on the Merrimack River. He had several other jobs, including working as a blacksmith and a cattle buyer. He ran a curtain rod business, a woollen mill, a spring water company and a dairy which produced thousand of gallons of cream which was sold to Boston. He also purchased a salt business, and ran a harness-racing track in Philadelphia. Continuing his enterprising ways, Gerald created a patent on an invention which improved the head of a sewing machine, for which he received $16,000.

On October 23, 1867, he married Caroline W. Rowell. They lived together in Gerald's adopted home of Fairfield, Maine, in what is now known as the Amos Gerald House.

After regular visits to New York City, Gerald turned his interests to railways, and he became one of the directors of the Waterville & Fairfield Horse Railroad Company in 1887. The same year, he established, with three others, the Bath Street Railway; however, the line did not open for a further five years.

The Augusta, Hallowell & Gardiner Street Railway was incorporated on March 6, 1889. It was the second electric street railway to open in the state, after the Bangor Street Railway the previous year.

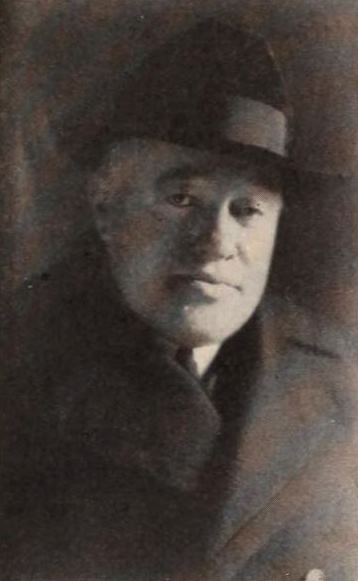
Gerald's son-in-law, Holman Day

Gerald left Maine briefly for Eau Claire, Wisconsin, where he oversaw the regeneration of the town's failing street railway system.

The only daughter of the Geralds, Helen, died in 1902. She was married to noted Maine poet Holman Day.

In 1903, Gerald built the short-lived Casco Castle in South Freeport, Maine. He had conceived it as a resort, with rooms for around one hundred guests, to encourage travel by trolleycars. It was Gerald's second such attempt; the first, the 140-acre (57 ha) Merrymeeting Park, in Brunswick, Maine, was a failure due to the town's small population. It featured a casino, zoo, hotel, gardens and an amphitheater.

In 1910, he built today's Amos Gerald House in Fairfield. It was added to the National Register of Historic Places in 1980.

== Death ==
Gerald died of apoplexy in Portland, Maine, on June 14, 1913. He was 70. He was interred in Maplewood Cemetery in Fairfield, alongside his daughter. His wife, who survived him by thirteen years, was buried alongside them both.
