= Somerset and Kennebec Railroad =

Former railroad company in Maine, US

Overview
- Locale: Maine
- Dates of operation: 1853–1874

Technical
- Track gauge: 4 ft 8 1/2 in (1,435 mm) standard gauge
- Length: 37.8 miles (60.8 km)

The Somerset and Kennebec Railroad was a 19th-century Maine railroad which became part of the Maine Central Railroad.

== History ==
The railroad was built in stages to serve mills along the Kennebec River upstream of Augusta, Maine, where it connected with the Portland and Kennebec Railroad. These two connecting railroads were built to standard gauge at a time when most Maine railroads were built to Portland gauge. The Somerset and Kennebec reached Waterville in 1853, Fairfield in 1855, and Skowhegan in 1856. Maine Central Railroad leased the two connecting standard gauge railroads in 1870, and converted its previous Portland gauge lines to standard gauge the following year. The downstream end of the Somerset and Kennebec became the northern portion of the Maine Central "lower road" main line, while the upstream portion became Maine Central's Skowhegan Branch. Most of the Skowhegan Branch was abandoned in 1971.

== Railway mileposts ==
Maine Central mileposts reflect main line distance from Portland and branch line distance from the branch junction with the main line.

=== Lower Road ===
- Milepost 62.3: Augusta agent's station
- Milepost 66.2: Kennebec
- Milepost 70.0: Riverside agent's station
- Milepost 73.7: Vassalboro agent's station
- Milepost 80.1: Winslow agent's station
- Milepost 81.7: Waterville agent's station
