= Fairfield (CDP), Maine =

Fairfield, Maine
- Census-designated place
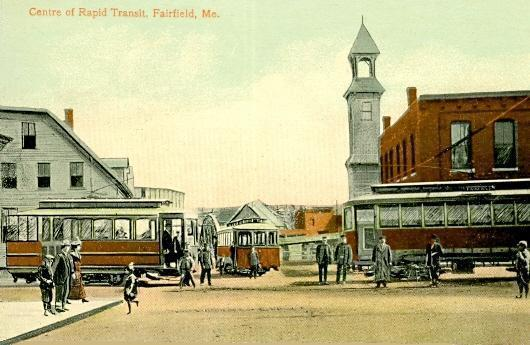

- Location within Maine Location within the United States
- Coordinates: 44°35′09″N 69°36′40″W
- Country: United States
- State: Maine
- County: Somerset

Area
  - Total: 2.03 sq mi (5.26 km^{2})
  - Land: 1.84 sq mi (4.76 km^{2})
  - Water: 0.19 sq mi (0.50 km^{2})
- Elevation: 138 ft (42 m)

Population (2020)
  - Total: 2,616
  - Density: 1,424.1/sq mi (549.83/km^{2})
- Time zone: UTC-5 (Eastern (EST))
  - Summer (DST): UTC-4 (EDT)
- ZIP code: 04937
- Area code: 207
- FIPS code: 23-24285
- GNIS feature ID: 2377906

Fairfield is a census-designated place (CDP) in the town of Fairfield in Somerset County, Maine, United States. The population was 2,569 at the 2000 census.

== Geography ==
According to the United States Census Bureau, the CDP has a total area of 1.8 square miles (4.8 km^{2}), all land. Fairfield is drained by the Kennebec River.

== Demographics ==
Historical population
Census	Pop.	Note	%±
2020	2,616		—
U.S. Decennial Census

As of the census of 2000, there were 2,569 people, 1,102 households, and 689 families residing in the CDP. The population density was 1,398.4 inhabitants per square mile (539.9/km^{2}). There were 1,223 housing units at an average density of 665.7 per square mile (257.0/km^{2}). The racial makeup of the CDP was 97.63% White, 0.23% Black or African American, 0.23% Native American, 0.51% Asian, 0.04% from other races, and 1.36% from two or more races. Hispanic or Latino of any race were 0.19% of the population.

There were 1,102 households, out of which 31.9% had children under the age of 18 living with them, 43.1% were married couples living together, 13.8% had a female householder with no husband present, and 37.4% were non-families. 30.2% of all households were made up of individuals, and 12.5% had someone living alone who was 65 years of age or older. The average household size was 2.33 and the average family size was 2.90.

In the CDP, the population was spread out, with 25.8% under the age of 18, 7.6% from 18 to 24, 28.9% from 25 to 44, 22.4% from 45 to 64, and 15.3% who were 65 years of age or older. The median age was 37 years. For every 100 females, there were 87.1 males. For every 100 females age 18 and over, there were 85.0 males.

The median income for a household in the CDP was $31,303, and the median income for a family was $41,458. Males had a median income of $30,018 versus $25,395 for females. The per capita income for the CDP was $15,070. About 4.2% of families and 10.6% of the population were below the poverty line, including 9.4% of those under age 18 and 17.1% of those age 65 or over.
