= Lisbon Falls High School =

- U.S. National Register of Historic Places
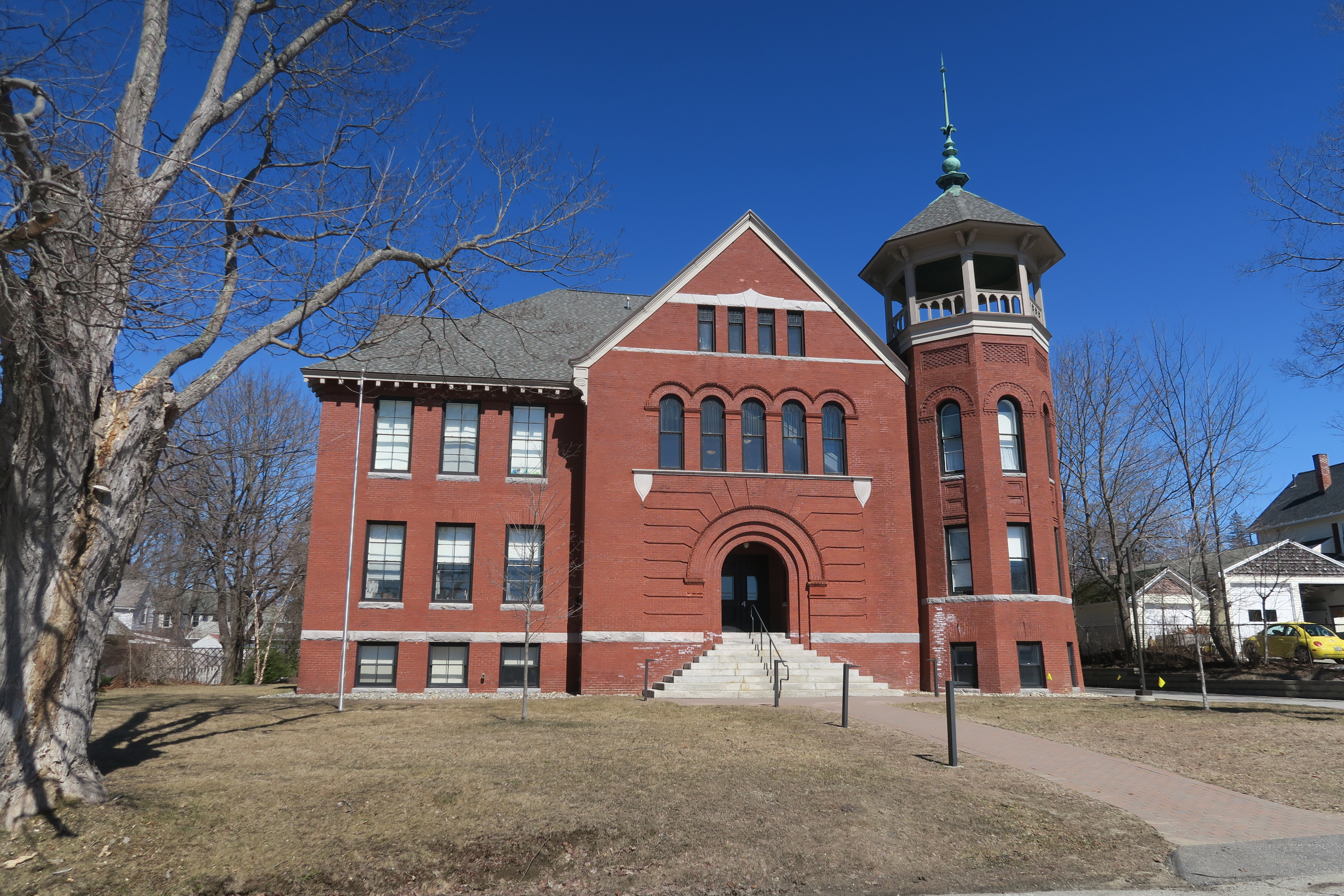
- Lisbon Falls High School

- Location within Maine Location within the United States
- Location: 4 Campus Ave., Lisbon Falls, Maine
- Coordinates: 44°00′05″N 70°03′33″W
- Area: 1.37 acres (0.55 ha)
- Built: 1904
- Architect: Miller, William R.; Philbrook, Joseph & Son
- Architectural style: Queen Anne, Romanesque
- NRHP reference No.: 07001150
- Added to NRHP: November 7, 2007

Lisbon Falls High School is a historic former school building at 4 Campus Avenue in Lisbon Falls, Maine. Built in 1904–05 to a design by William R. Miller, it is a significant local example of Romanesque Revival architecture. It served as the high school for Lisbon Falls students until 1952, and then as a grammar school. It was listed on the National Register of Historic Places in 2007.

== Description and history ==
The former Lisbon Falls High School building stands on the north side of Campus Avenue, between Berry Avenue and Addison Street in the village of Lisbon Falls. It is a 2 1/2 story masonry structure, built out of red brick with granite trim. It is roughly rectangular in shape, with a hip roof, projecting front gable section, and a three-story tower projecting from the front right corner. The third level of the tower is open, and is topped by a turret roof with bracketed cornice. The third level of the tower contained the school bell with the rope hanging down into the second level. The central gable section has the main entrance in an elaborate round-arch opening (accessed via a flaring flight of granite steps), with a band of narrow round-arch windows above, and a band of rectangular sash in the gable.

The school was built in 1904–05 to a design by Lewiston architect William R. Miller, who by then had a well-established reputation for highly decorated school buildings. The school served the local community as a high school until 1952, when it was converted into a grammar school with grades 4th and 5th. From 1985 to 2006 it house the school district offices.

== See also ==
- National Register of Historic Places listings in Androscoggin County, Maine
