= Lawrence Library =

- U.S. National Register of Historic Places
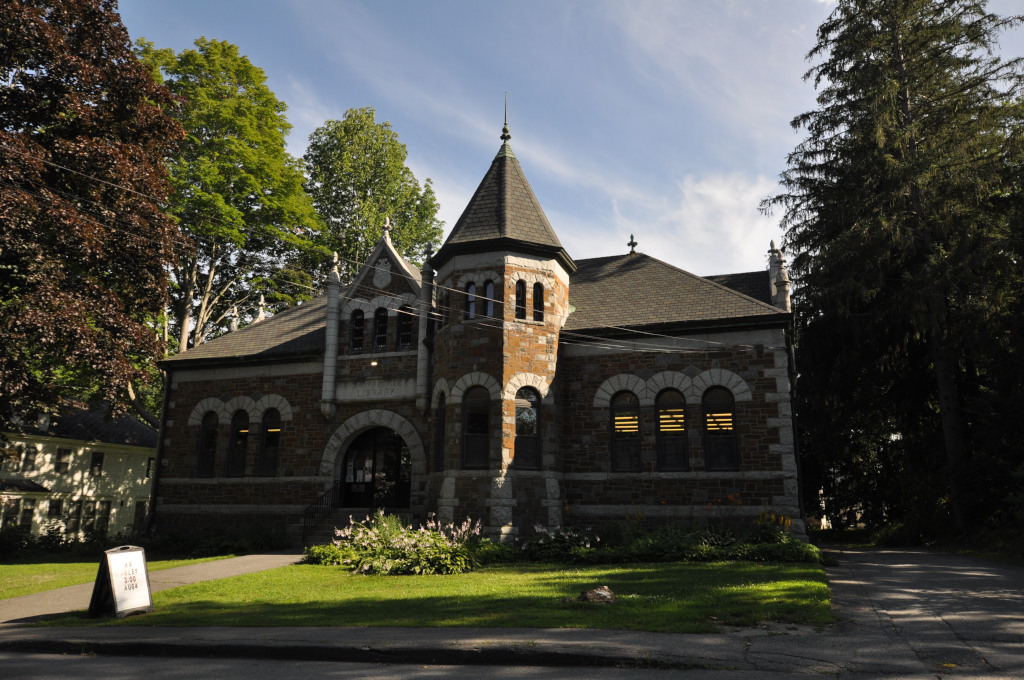

- Location within Maine Location within the United States
- Location: 33 Lawrence Ave., Fairfield, Maine
- Coordinates: 44°35′16″N 69°36′10″W
- Area: 1 acre (0.40 ha)
- Built: 1900
- Architect: William R. Miller
- Architectural style: Romanesque Revival, Richardsonian Romanesque
- NRHP reference No.: 74000322
- Added to NRHP: December 31, 1974

The Lawrence Library is the public library of Fairfield, Maine. It is located at 33 Lawrence Avenue, in an architecturally distinguished Romanesque Revival building designed by William R. Miller and completed in 1901. The building was listed on the National Register of Historic Places in 1974.

== Architecture and history ==
The library is set on the south side of Lawrence Street, in a residential area a short way west of Fairfield's central business district. It is a roughly rectangular structure, two stories in height, with a slate hip roof and walls of slate and granite. Its main facade, facing north, is divided into four sections. The outer two sections each consist of three round-arch openings, the arches prominently formed out of light granite, with windows set in them. The center-left bay houses the main entrance, which is set in a large round arch, and is topped by large, slightly projecting, gabled dormer section which houses three smaller round-arch windows, a granite crest bearing the construction date (1900), and a panel naming the building. The bay to the right has a projecting polygonal tower capped by a turreted roof. The first level of the tower has single round-arch windows, while the second has smaller paired round-arch windows. Belt courses of light granite extend across the facade at several levels, contrasting the verticality of the windows.

Fairfield's library was established in 1895 by the local Ladies Book Club, with 48 volumes placed in a local shop. The library grew rapidly, highlighting the need for a permanent home. Edward J. Lawrence, owner of a local sawmill, donated $15,000 for the construction of the building, which was designed by Lewiston architect William R. Miller, and built in 1900–01 on land donated by Mrs. L. E. Newhall; both Lawrence and Newhall also donated funds to further increase the collection. Miller was a well-known architect with a practice that extended across central Maine; his design, while clearly based on the innovations of architect H. H. Richardson in the style and function of libraries, also exhibits some Beaux Arts features then coming into vogue. The building has been remarkably unaltered since its construction, retaining the original uses of the three-part layout of the first floor (reading room, circulation area, stacks) with storage on the second level.

== Significance ==
Architect William R. Miller's Lawrence Library of 1900 in Fairfield strongly reflects the influence of H. H. Richardson. During the 1870s and ’80s, Richardson started to restructure American architectural design by the forceful unity with which he formulated Medieval Romanesque forms as well as by his utility in organizing space. Small community libraries were emerging at this time, and these became one of the building types most frequently requested of Richardson and his contemporaries. Richardson resolved the problem by creating one-and-a-half-story structures such as the Crane Memorial Library in Quincy, Massachusetts of 1880–83, which were divided into 3 vital sections, a reading room, and stacks flanking an entrance. The Lawrence Library is an adaptation of Richardson's libraries in both style and plan. Yet the Fairfield building's departure from Richardson's purity of Romanesque detail and asymmetry in composition is indicative of the Beaux Arts influence which was being felt in the late nineteenth and early twentieth centuries.

Like so many of its counterparts, the Lawrence Library was the outgrowth of a nineteenth century private library organization. In the case of Fairfield, this was the Ladies Book Club. Founded in 1895, the Club started with twenty-four members and forty-eight books. A bookcase was placed in a local confectioner's shop with the hope of adding fifty volumes each year. However, interest in the effort grew more rapidly than was anticipated, and by 1899 the club had moved to two rooms in a bank block. The continued growth and support of the library resulted in serious consideration of a permanent building to house the collection. During the club's meeting of May, 1900, Edward J. Lawrence announced that he was prepared to give his native town a public library if a suitable site could be found. Within a short time, Mrs. L.E. Newhall donated a choice lot which faced the community park and was located between her residence and that of Lawrence's.

Edward J. Lawrence was a highly successful lumberman. At the turn of the century, his mills sawed 120,000 feet of lumber per day and employed 225 men. He made available $15,000 to construct the library from the plans of William R. Miller (1866–1929), a prominent Lewiston, Maine, architect whose practice extended throughout Central Maine. In addition, both Lawrence and Mrs. Newhall gave $1,000 each for the purchase of books.

== See also ==
- National Register of Historic Places listings in Somerset County, Maine
