= Amos Gerald House =

Historic house in Maine, United States

- U.S. National Register of Historic Places
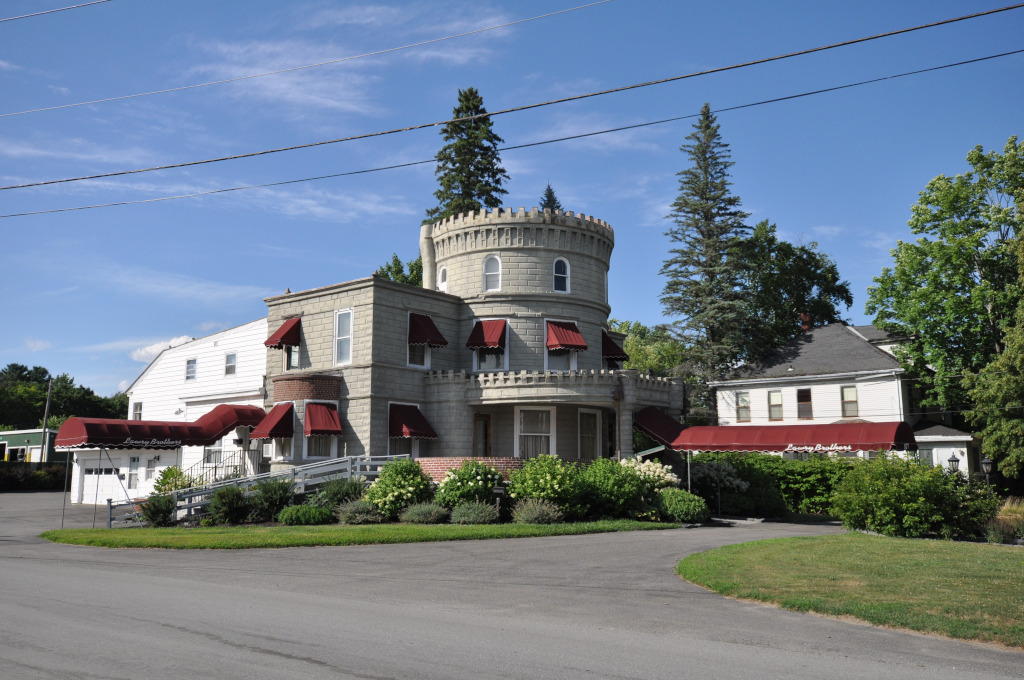
- 2022 photo

- Location within Maine Location within the United States
- Location: 107 Main St., Fairfield, Maine
- Coordinates: 44°35′5″N 69°35′54″W
- Area: 0.3 acres (0.12 ha)
- Built: 1910
- Architectural style: Medieval Revival
- NRHP reference No.: 80000252
- Added to NRHP: June 24, 1980

The Amos Gerald House is a historic house at 107 Main Street in Fairfield, Maine. Built c. 1910 by Maine businessman Amos F. Gerald, the house is notable both for its architecture, which is best described as resembling a medieval castle, and for its association with Gerald, who was a major proponent of electrification in the state, and who built many of the state's (now defunct) trolley systems. The house was listed on the National Register of Historic Places in 1980.

== Description and history ==
The Gerald House is set on the northwest side of Main Street (United States Route 201) on the fringe of Fairfield's central business district. It is a two-story building with a prominent centrally-placed three-story round tower that has a crenellated parapet. The building is fashioned out of concrete blocks that are finished to resemble rusticated stone. Its roof is flat, and the main roof originally had a parapet similar to that of the tower. Surrounding the tower on the front is a single-story porch supported by thick columns, also fashioned out of concrete blocks, and sporting a crenellated parapet. A wood-frame addition extends to the rear of the main block.

== See also ==
- National Register of Historic Places listings in Somerset County, Maine
