= L. C. Bates Museum =

- Quincy Building
- U.S. National Register of Historic Places
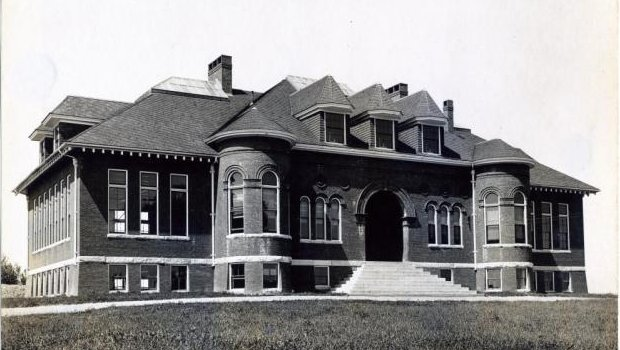
- The Quincy Building, not long after its construction

- Location within Maine Location within the United States
- Nearest city: Hinckley, Maine
- Coordinates: 44°39′45″N 69°37′40″W
- Area: 1 acre (0.40 ha)
- Built: 1903
- Architect: William R. Miller
- Architectural style: Romanesque
- NRHP reference No.: 78000330
- Added to NRHP: October 4, 1978

The L.C. Bates Museum is an early 20th-century natural history and cultural museum in Hinckley, Maine, United States, located on the campus of Good Will-Hinckley. It was founded by George Walter Hinckley (1853–1950), as a part of the Good Will Home, a pioneering residential and educational institution for underprivileged children.

== Description ==
The museum is housed in The Quincy Building, a 1903 Romanesque Revival brick school building, designed by noted Lewiston architect, William R. Miller (1866–1929). The building originally served as an industrial and training space, but was repurposed to house the museum by the early 1920s. The building, with its distinctive terracotta egg and dart ornamentation, and arched windows, is listed on the National Register of Historic Places.

Described as a “Museum of a Museum”, The L.C. Bates Museum contains Maine's most well preserved museum interiors from the early 20th century. Its exhibits include 32 Maine habitat dioramas, galleries of birds, mammals, marine life, insects, reptiles, and minerals, as well as hands-on educational exhibits.

The backgrounds for the dioramas were painted in the 1920s by noted American Impressionist painter Charles Daniel Hubbard (1876–1951).

Sun Set Park, an arboretum, is located on the museum grounds. The arboretum was, in part, designed by the renowned Olmsted Brothers landscape architecture practice. Sun Set Park includes natural areas with walking trails, complementing the museum's focus on Maine's natural history.

== See also ==
- List of natural history museums
- List of museums in Maine
- National Register of Historic Places listings in Somerset County, Maine
