= Shawmut, Maine =

- Village
- Location within Maine
- Coordinates: 44°37′34″N 69°35′13″W
- Country: United States
- State: Maine
- County: Somerset
- Elevation: 151 ft (46 m)
- Time zone: UTC-5 (Eastern (EST))
  - Summer (DST): UTC-4 (EDT)
- ZIP code: 04975
- Area code: 207
- GNIS feature ID: 575333

Shawmut is an unincorporated village in the town of Fairfield, Somerset County, Maine, United States. The community is located along U.S. Route 201 and the Kennebec River, which is dammed at the village; it is 11.5 miles (18.5 km) south-southeast of Skowhegan. Shawmut has a post office, with ZIP code 04975.
