= Benton, Maine =

Town in Maine, United States

- Town
- Logo

- Location in Kennebec County and the state of Maine
- Coordinates: 44°36′41″N 69°31′25″W
- Country: United States
- State: Maine
- County: Kennebec
- Villages: Benton; Benton Falls; Benton Station; East Benton

Area
  - Total: 29.06 sq mi (75.27 km^{2})
  - Land: 28.41 sq mi (73.58 km^{2})
  - Water: 0.65 sq mi (1.68 km^{2})
- Elevation: 157 ft (48 m)

Population (2020)
  - Total: 2,715
  - Density: 96/sq mi (36.9/km^{2})
- Time zone: UTC-5 (Eastern (EST))
  - Summer (DST): UTC-4 (EDT)
- ZIP code: 04901
- Area code: 207
- FIPS code: 23-04475
- GNIS feature ID: 582350
- Website: www.bentonmaine.info

Benton is a town in Kennebec County, Maine, United States. It was formed in 1842, as a subdivision of the town of Clinton. The population was 2,715 at the 2020 census. The town was named for Missouri Senator Thomas Hart Benton.

== Geography ==
According to the United States Census Bureau, the town has a total area of 29.06 square miles (75.27 km^{2}), of which 28.41 square miles (73.58 km^{2}) is land and 0.65 square miles (1.68 km^{2}) is water.

== Demographics ==
Historical population
Census	Pop.	Note	%±
1850	1,189		—
1860	1,183		−0.5%
1870	1,180		−0.3%
1880	1,173		−0.6%
1890	1,136		−3.2%
1900	1,097		−3.4%
1910	1,194		8.8%
1920	1,108		−7.2%
1930	1,156		4.3%
1940	1,290		11.6%
1950	1,421		10.2%
1960	1,521		7.0%
1970	1,729		13.7%
1980	2,188		26.5%
1990	2,312		5.7%
2000	2,557		10.6%
2010	2,732		6.8%
2020	2,715		−0.6%
U.S. Decennial Census

=== 2010 census ===
As of the census of 2010, there were 2,732 people, 1,104 households, and 792 families living in the town. The population density was 96.2 inhabitants per square mile (37.1/km^{2}). There were 1,164 housing units at an average density of 41.0 per square mile (15.8/km^{2}). The racial makeup of the town was 98.2% White, 0.3% African American, 0.3% Native American, 0.3% Asian, 0.1% from other races, and 0.9% from two or more races. Hispanic or Latino of any race were 0.6% of the population.

There were 1,104 households, of which 30.5% had children under the age of 18 living with them, 56.4% were married couples living together, 9.1% had a female householder with no husband present, 6.3% had a male householder with no wife present, and 28.3% were non-families. 22.0% of all households were made up of individuals, and 9.8% had someone living alone who was 65 years of age or older. The average household size was 2.47 and the average family size was 2.84.

The median age in the town was 42.5 years. 22.5% of residents were under the age of 18; 6.5% were between the ages of 18 and 24; 24.8% were from 25 to 44; 30.9% were from 45 to 64; and 15.3% were 65 years of age or older. The gender makeup of the town was 49.7% male and 50.3% female.

=== 2000 census ===
As of the census of 2000, there were 2,557 people, 1,013 households, and 749 families living in the town. The population density was 90.0 inhabitants per square mile (34.7/km^{2}). There were 1,069 housing units at an average density of 37.6 per square mile (14.5/km^{2}). The racial makeup of the town was 98.67% White, 0.20% African American, 0.23% Native American, 0.12% Asian, 0.20% from other races, and 0.59% from two or more races. Hispanic or Latino of any race were 0.47% of the population.

There were 1,013 households, out of which 32.9% had children under the age of 18 living with them, 60.2% were married couples living together, 9.2% had a female householder with no husband present, and 26.0% were non-families. 19.4% of all households were made up of individuals, and 8.1% had someone living alone who was 65 years of age or older. The average household size was 2.52 and the average family size was 2.88.

In the town, the population was spread out, with 24.8% under the age of 18, 6.0% from 18 to 24, 30.6% from 25 to 44, 26.7% from 45 to 64, and 11.8% who were 65 years of age or older. The median age was 38 years. For every 100 females, there were 105.2 males. For every 100 females age 18 and over, there were 102.7 males.

The median income for a household in the town was $38,613, and the median income for a family was $41,597. Males had a median income of $35,882 versus $23,856 for females. The per capita income for the town was $18,464. About 6.1% of families and 10.2% of the population were below the poverty line, including 11.6% of those under age 18 and 0.7% of those age 65 or over.

== Notable person ==
- Amos F. Gerald, railroad engineer
- Brian L. Buker, Medal of Honor recipient
