= Fairfield, Maine =

- Town
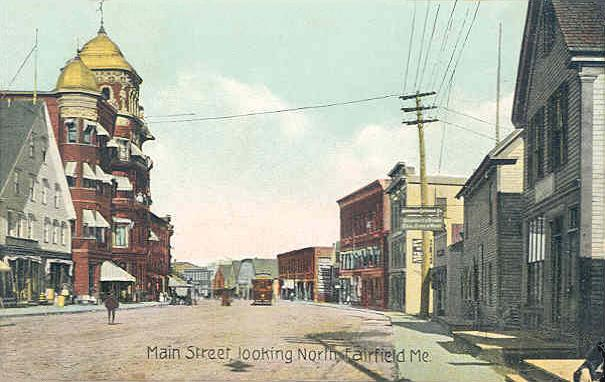
- Main Street in 1910

- Seal

- Location within Maine Location within the United States
- Coordinates: 44°37′35″N 69°40′31″W
- Country: United States
- State: Maine
- County: Somerset
- Incorporated: 1788

Area
  - Total: 54.58 sq mi (141.36 km^{2})
  - Land: 53.75 sq mi (139.21 km^{2})
  - Water: 0.83 sq mi (2.15 km^{2})
- Elevation: 223 ft (68 m)

Population (2020)
  - Total: 6,484
  - Density: 121/sq mi (46.6/km^{2})
- Time zone: UTC-5 (Eastern (EST))
  - Summer (DST): UTC-4 (EDT)
- ZIP Codes: 04937 (Fairfield); 04944 (Hinckley); 04975 (Shawmut)
- Area code: 207
- FIPS code: 23-24320
- GNIS feature ID: 582471
- Website: www.fairfield-me.gov

Fairfield is a town in Somerset County, Maine, United States. The population was 6,484 at the 2020 census. The town includes Fairfield Center, Fairfield village and Hinckley, and borders the city of Waterville to the south. It is home to the Good Will-Hinckley School, Lawrence High School and Kennebec Valley Community College.

== History ==
The area was territory of the Canibas tribe of Abenaki Indians residing at Taconnet village, once located downriver at the confluence of the Sebasticook and Kennebec rivers in what is today Winslow. In 1692 during King William's War, the village was burned, so the Canibas tribe abandoned the area. The French and Indian Wars finally ended in 1763, leaving the region open for English colonization. Fairfield Plantation, named for its fair aspect, was first settled in 1774.

Benedict Arnold and his troops rested and re-provisioned here in 1775 during their march up the Kennebec River to the Battle of Quebec. Following the Revolutionary War, Fairfield Plantation developed as a trade and agricultural town, with farms producing hay, grain and potatoes. It was noted for the number and quality of its cattle. On June 18, 1788, it was incorporated as Fairfield. By 1790, the community had 492 inhabitants. In 1837, it produced 11,531 bushels of wheat and a large quantity of wool.

Falls on the Kennebec drop 34 feet (10 m) at Fairfield, providing water power for industry. The mill town had eight sawmills, three planing mills, a gristmill, a canned corn factory, plaster mill, three carriage factories, a sled factory, two door, sash and blind factories, a cabinet and box factory, coffin factory, a clothing factory, a marble works and a tannery. The largest factories were the textile plants—Kendall's Mills in the southeastern extremity of the town, and Somerset Mills located about two miles above.

The main line of the Maine Central Railroad passes through Fairfield on the way from Portland to Waterville to Bangor, and the Skowhegan branch of the Maine Central Railroad (originally the Somerset and Kennebec Railroad) ran along the Kennebec River from Waterville to Skowhegan, with stations in Shawmut and Hinckley (today, this line terminates at the SAPPI paper mill just north of Hinckley). The Somerset Railroad (Maine) traversed western Fairfield on a route that once ran north from Oakland to Norridgewock, Madison, Bingham, and Moosehead Lake.

In 1889, Reverend George W. Hinckley founded the Hinckley School. In 1899–1900, The Gerald Hotel was built downtown. Designed by Maine architect William Robinson Miller, it was commissioned by Amos F. Gerald, builder of the first electric trolley system in Maine. The hotel was topped with a statue of Mercury, the Roman god of speed, and remained in operation from 1900 until 1937. Miller also designed the town's Lawrence Library, dedicated on July 25, 1901, and the Lawrence High School. Today, Fairfield makes wood and paper products, and is largely a bedroom community for Waterville.

The town has three post offices because it contains four different unincorporated townships under municipal jurisdiction of the town of Fairfield:

- Fairfield Center (no post office)
- Shawmut (post office location)
- Hinckley (post office location)
- Larone (no post office)

The third post office serves the incorporated urban Fairfield (CDP), an early name for which was Kendall's Mills. For approximately 75 years, the urban district was under a village corporation government. Thus, the town would hold New England style town meetings that covered business for the greater town, followed by a village corporation meeting to deal with urban needs, including police service, fire department service and town engineer service (public works). The non-urban, unincorporated areas—Shawmut, Fairfield Center and Hinckley—were not assessed taxes for urban services they did not receive. This arrangement ended in 1929.

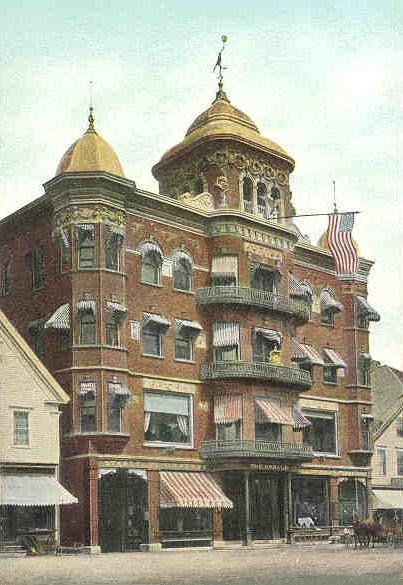
The Gerald Hotel in 1905

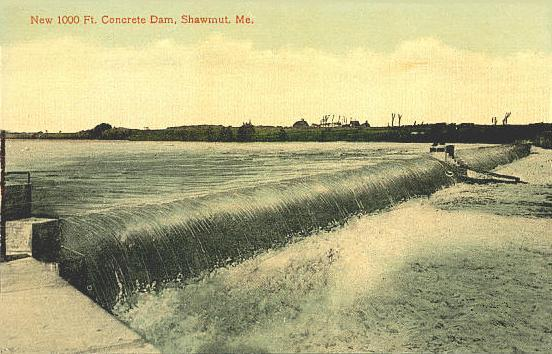
Dam at Shawmut in 1908

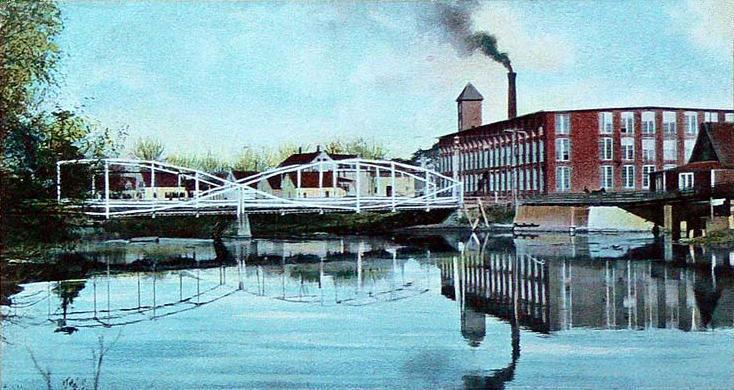
Woolen mill in 1905

== Geography ==
According to the United States Census Bureau, the town has a total area of 54.58 square miles (141.36 km^{2}), of which 53.75 square miles (139.21 km^{2}) is land and 0.83 square miles (2.15 km^{2}) is water. Fairfield is drained by the Kennebec River.

=== Climate ===
This climatic region is typified by large seasonal temperature differences, with warm to hot (and often humid) summers and cold (sometimes severely cold) winters. According to the Köppen Climate Classification system, Fairfield has a humid continental climate, abbreviated "Dfb" on climate maps.

== Demographics ==
Historical population
Census	Pop.	Note	%±
1790	458		—
1800	852		86.0%
1810	1,348		58.2%
1820	1,609		19.4%
1830	2,002		24.4%
1840	2,198		9.8%
1850	2,452		11.6%
1860	2,753		12.3%
1870	2,998		8.9%
1880	3,044		1.5%
1890	3,510		15.3%
1900	3,878		10.5%
1910	4,435		14.4%
1920	4,253		−4.1%
1930	5,132		20.7%
1940	5,294		3.2%
1950	5,811		9.8%
1960	5,829		0.3%
1970	5,684		−2.5%
1980	6,113		7.5%
1990	6,718		9.9%
2000	6,573		−2.2%
2010	6,735		2.5%
2020	6,484		−3.7%
U.S. Decennial Census

=== 2010 census ===
As of the census of 2010, there were 6,735 people, 2,793 households, and 1,851 families residing in the town. The population density was 125.3 inhabitants per square mile (48.4/km^{2}). There were 3,016 housing units at an average density of 56.1 per square mile (21.7/km^{2}). The racial makeup of the town was 97.4% White, 0.4% African American, 0.4% Native American, 0.5% Asian, 0.1% from other races, and 1.2% from two or more races. Hispanic or Latino of any race were 0.5% of the population.

There were 2,793 households, of which 30.6% had children under the age of 18 living with them, 49.3% were married couples living together, 10.5% had a female householder with no husband present, 6.5% had a male householder with no wife present, and 33.7% were non-families. 26.0% of all households were made up of individuals, and 9.2% had someone living alone who was 65 years of age or older. The average household size was 2.40 and the average family size was 2.85.

The median age in the town was 41.8 years. 22.5% of residents were under the age of 18; 7.8% were between the ages of 18 and 24; 24.9% were from 25 to 44; 31% were from 45 to 64; and 13.8% were 65 years of age or older. The gender makeup of the town was 49.4% male and 50.6% female.

=== 2000 census ===
As of the census of 2000, there were 6,573 people, 2,586 households, and 1,773 families residing in the town. The population density was 122.3 people per 1 per square mile (0.39/km^{2}). There were 2,801 housing units at an average density of 52.1 per square mile (20.1/km^{2}). The racial makeup of the town was 97.92% White, 0.35% Bl.ack o.r African American, 0.33% Native American, 0.27% Asian, 0.05% Pacific Islander, 0.05% from other races, and 1.03% from two or more races. Hispanic or Latino of any race were 0.30% of the population.

There were 2,586 households, out of which 33.6% had children under the age of 18 living with them, 52.0% were married couples living together, 11.8% had a female householder with no husband present, and 31.4% were non-families. 24.1% of all households were made up of individuals, and 8.7% had someone living alone who was 65 years of age or older. The average household size was 2.47 and the average family size was 2.92.

In the town, the population was spread out, with 26.8% under the age of 18, 7.2% from 18 to 24, 30.6% from 25 to 44, 23.4% from 45 to 64, and 12.1% who were 65 years of age or older. The median age was 37 years. For every 100 females, there were 94.7 males. For every 100 females age 18 and over, there were 91.7 males.

The median income for a household in the town was $36,462, and the median income for a family was $43,533. Males had a median income of $31,227 versus $22,930 for females. The per capita income for the town was $16,335. About 6.3% of families and 10.4% of the population were below the poverty line, including 9.8% of those under age 18 and 12.4% of those age 65 or over.

== Government ==
Fairfield has a government established in accordance with its municipal charter. Like many Maine towns, Fairfield has a "meeting, council, and manager" form of government. The town meeting is a citizen legislature, with limited legislative responsibility primarily related to establishing the town budget, approving annual appropriations, and approving any new indebtedness the town may incur. A five-member Town Council carries out the towns remaining legislative functions, including the creation of regulations, ordinances, and town policy, the approval of town contracts and commissions, and the appointment of town officers. The council also carries out quasi-judicial functions, such as review of certain decisions by town boards and committees or town officers. The council also oversees the work of the Town Manager. The Town Manager carries out the day to day executive functions of the town under the guidance and in consultation with the Town Council and advises the council on matters before it.

The current Town Manager is Michelle Flewelling.

== Sites of interest ==
- L. C. Bates Museum
- Cotton-Smith House, Fairfield Historical Society Museum
- Stone historical markers commemorating:
  - Benedict Arnold's 1775 encampment—north end of Main Street at its merger with Route 201.
  - Veterans of American conflicts in Panama, Grenada, Lebanon, Libya and the Gulf War—across from Fairfield Primary School.

== Education ==
Fairfield schools are part of Maine School Administrative District 49. Roberta Hersom is the Superintendent of Schools.

The following schools are in the district, Albion Elementary, Adult Education, Benton Elementary, Clinton Elementary, Fairfield Primary, District Childcare Program, Lawrence High School and Lawrence Junior High School.

Kennebec Valley Community College is located in Fairfield and is one of the seven colleges in the Maine Community College System. Colby College and Thomas College are four year colleges located in the neighboring town of Waterville.

== Notable people ==
- Ethel Atwood, musician, orchestra founder
- Charles A. Coffin, cofounder and first President of General Electric corporation
- Frank Bunker Gilbreth Sr., pioneer of Time and Motion Study and subject of the biographical novel Cheaper by the Dozen
