= William R. Miller (architect) =

American architect

- Born: 1866; Durham, Maine
- Died: 1929 (aged 62–63)
- Education: Bates College
- Occupation: Architect

William Robinson Miller (1866–1929) was an American architect from Maine. He specialized in richly ornamented Romanesque- and French-Revival buildings. Born in Durham, Maine, Miller attended Bates College and the School of Architecture at the Massachusetts Institute of Technology (1891–1892).

The firm of William R. Miller was located in Lewiston, Maine, and was in business from 1896 until 1907. The firm designed schools, libraries, hotels and churches, as well as private residences throughout the state.

In 1907, Miller partnered with Raymond J. Mayo (1879–1966), forming the firm of Miller & Mayo. Shortly after, they moved the practice to Portland, Maine. The practice continued to work on commissions in small towns across Maine.

In 1926, Lester I. Beal (1887–1966) became a partner, and this firm lasted until shortly before Miller's death.

== Architectural works ==
=== Schools ===
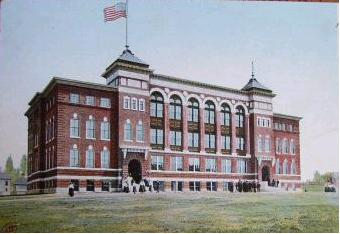
Jordan High School

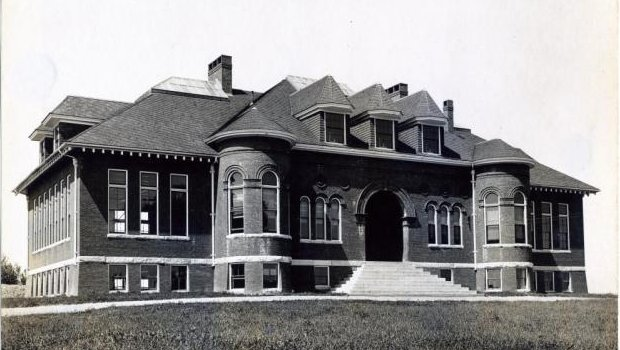
Current L.C. Bates Museum
- School, Winthrop Center, 1900, Demolished*
- Wilson School, Dunn Street, Auburn, 1900, Demolished
- Jordan High School, Lewiston, 1901–02*
- Beta Theta Pi Fraternity, 19 McKeen Street, Brunswick, 1903, Altered
- Coburn Dormitory, Colby College, Waterville, 1903, Demolished*
- Manual Training Building (L. C. Bates Museum), Good Will Home, Hinckley, 1903, Extant*
- Morse High School, Bath, 1903, Demolished*
- High School, South Paris, 1903, Demolished
- School, Wilton, 1903, Demolished
- Bancroft-Foote Cottage, Good Will Home, Hinckley, 1904, Altered
- Administration Building, Maine Industrial School for Girls, Hallowell, 1905
- High School, Lisbon Falls, 1905
- Charles R. Moody School, Good Will Home, Hinckley, 1905–06*
- Lawrence High School, Fairfield, 1906–07, Altered*
- Purington Hall, University of Maine Farmington, 1913–14*
- South (changed to Mallett in 1940) Hall, University of Maine Farmington, 1925*

=== Libraries ===
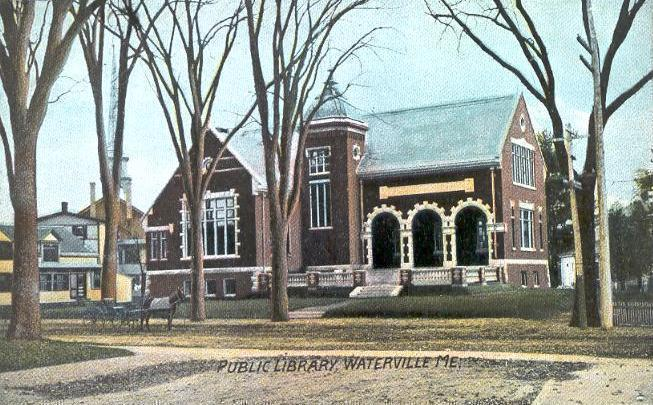
Carnegie Library, Waterville

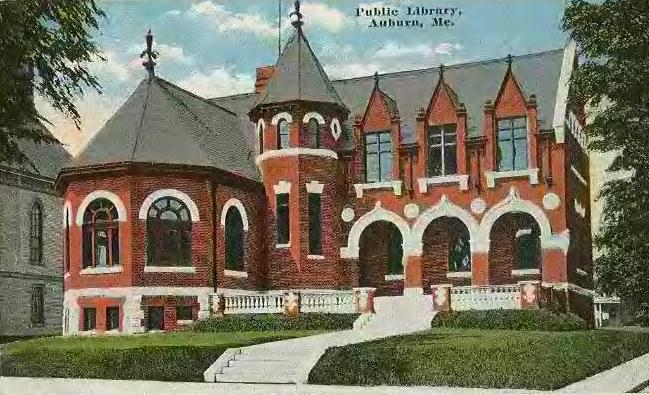
Carnegie Library, Auburn
- Lawrence Library, Fairfield, 1900–01*
- Cutler Library, Farmington, 1901–02*
- Carnegie Library, Waterville, 1903–04
- Carnegie Library, Auburn, 1903–04

=== Hotels ===
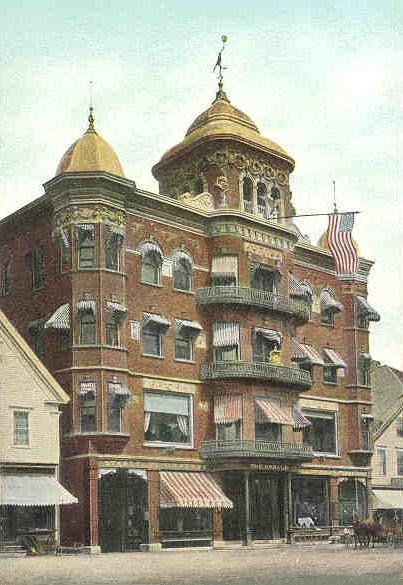
The Gerald Hotel in 1905
- Gerald Hotel, Fairfield, 1899–1900, Altered*
- Great Northern Hotel, Millinocket, 1900, Demolished*
- Hotel Rumford, Additions, Rumford Falls, 1901, Demolished
- Hotel, Cape Breton, Nova Scotia, 1903, Unlocated
- Hotel, Bras d'Or Lake, Nova Scotia, 1903, Unlocated
- Hotel for George Pike, West Stewartstown, New Hampshire, Undated and Unlocated*

=== Churches ===
- Wesley Methodist Church, Washington Street, Bath, 1898–99
- First Congregational Church, Gray, 1900
- People's Baptist Church, Bath, 1901–02, Demolished*
- Episcopal Church, Millinocket, 1902, Altered*
- Universalist Church, Sabattus Avenue, Lewiston, 1903*

=== Residences ===
- William Greenleaf House, 9 Vine Street, Auburn, 1898
- Samuel R. Penney House, 38 Maple Street, Mechanic Falls, 1900
- H. B. Estes Cottage, Pine Point, Old Orchard, c. 1900
- Almorit R. Penney House, 36 Maple Street, Mechanic Falls, 1900, Demolished
- Charles V. Penney House, Spring Street (Relocated to Pleasant Street), Mechanic Falls, 1900, Altered
- Two Houses for Great Northern Paper Company, Millinocket, c. 1900, Unlocated*
- Snell House Hotel, Houlton, 1901, Demolished
- George W. Bean House, 67 Webster Street, Lewiston, 1903, Altered
- Five Cottages for C. F. Maines, Lewiston, 1903, Unlocated
- J. R. Goodspeed House, Village View Road, Wilton, 1906–07*
- J. R. Fairchild House, Hoyts Island, Belgrade, c. 1906, Unlocated

=== Miscellaneous ===
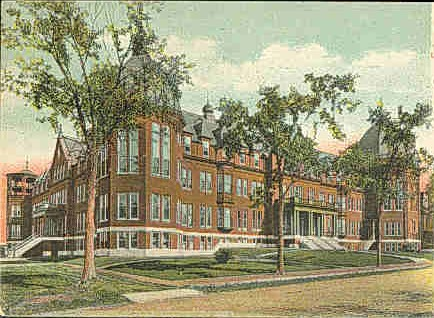
St. Mary's Hospital, Lewiston

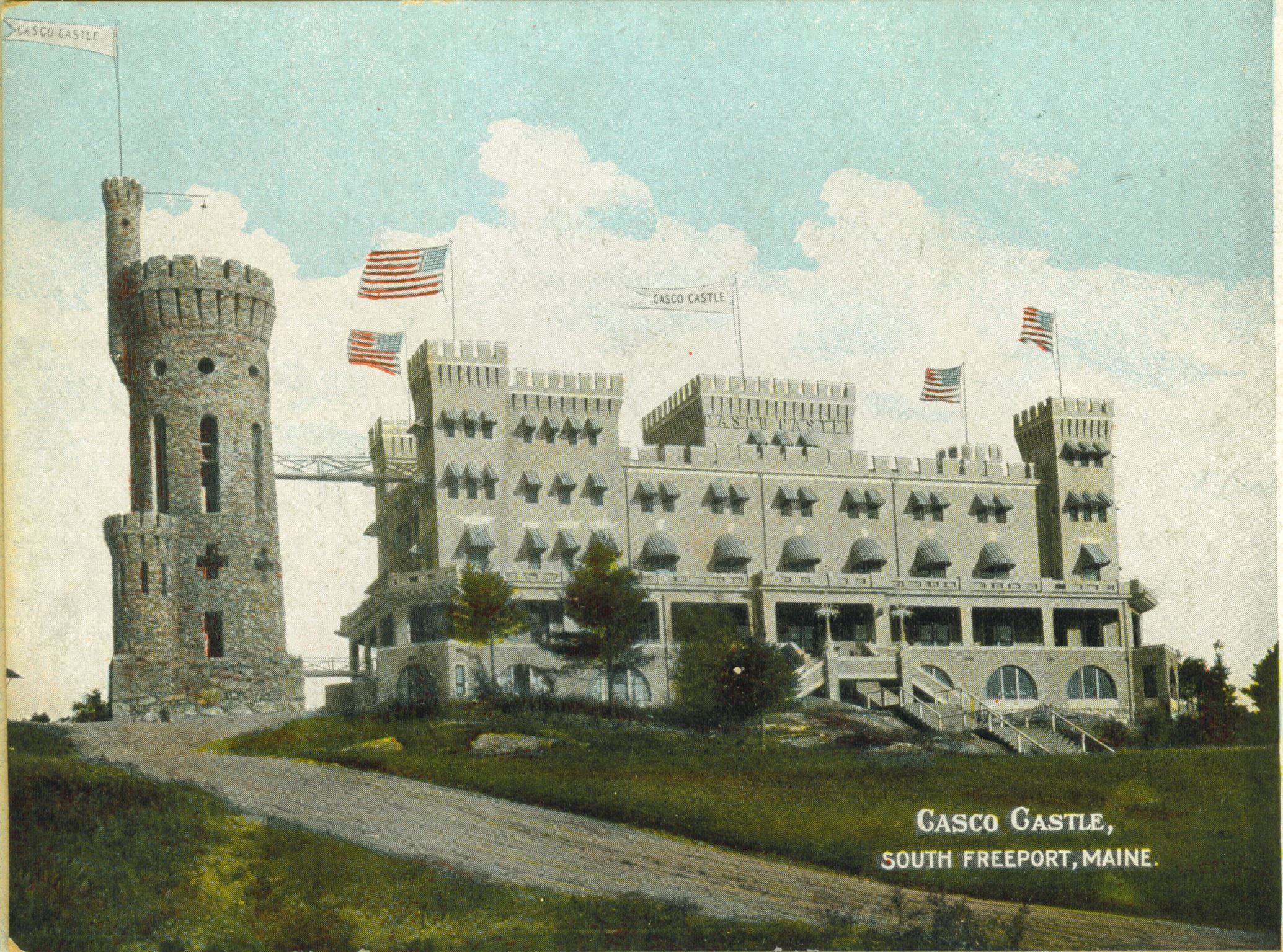
Casco Castle, South Freeport

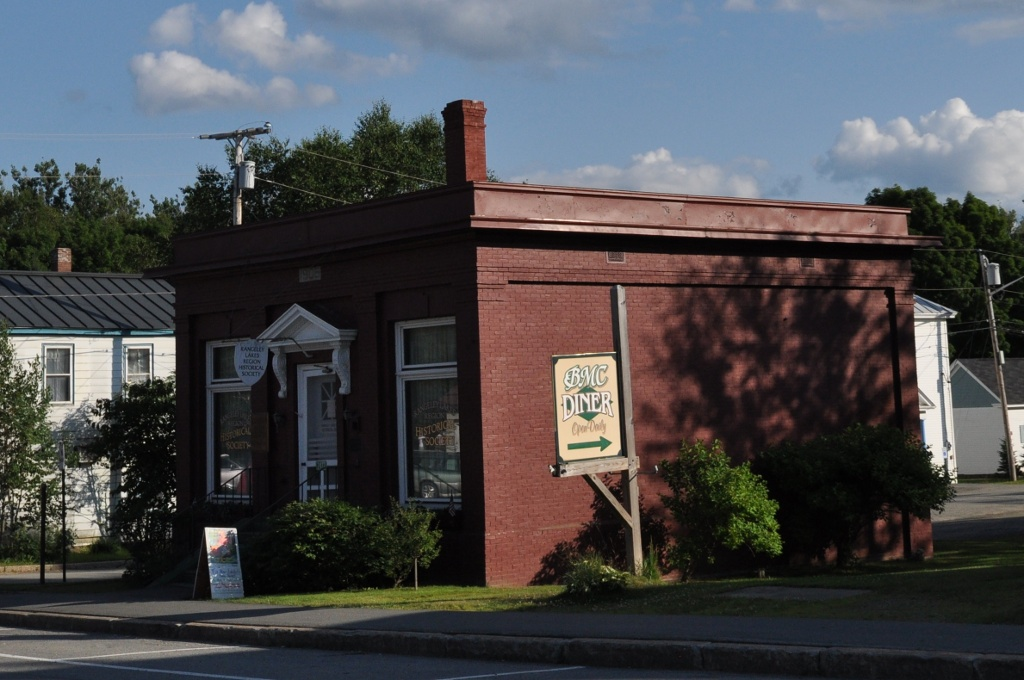
Rangeley Trust Company Building, Rangeley
- Lewiston Daily Journal Building, 12-16 Lisbon Street, Lewiston, 1897, Demolished
- C.M. Rice Block, Market Square, Houlton, 1897
- The Lewiston, Brunswick and Bath Street Railway Company Carbarn, Lower Lisbon Street, Lewiston, 1899, Demolished
- Knights of Pythias Block, South Paris, 1900, Altered
- Casco Castle and Tower, South Freeport, 1902, Demolished (Tower Extant)*
- St. Mary's Regional Medical Center, Lewiston, 1902
- McGillicuddy Block, Lisbon Street, Lewiston, 1903, Altered*
- R. H. Greenleaf Block, Albuquerque, New Mexico, 1903–04, Demolished
- Somerset Railroad Station, Madison, 1904
- A. H. Shaw Stable, High Street, Bath, 1904*
- Rangeley Trust Company Building, 1905
- Fire Station, Skowhegan, 1905
- General J. A. Hill Tomb, Oak Hill Cemetery, Auburn, 1905*

The Maine Historical Society maintains a collection of drawings by William R. Miller and successor firms. These consist primarily of working drawings on linen. When drawings exist they are noted with asterisks in the list of commissions. In addition, the Maine Historic Preservation Commission has plans and elevations for the Somerset Railroad Station in Madison.

== See also ==
- List of American Architects
- List of Carnegie libraries in Maine
