= Otherworld (painting) =

Painting by Andrew Wyeth

- Artist: Andrew Wyeth
- Year: 2002
- Medium: Tempera on panel
- Dimensions: 77.5 cm × 121.3 cm (30.5 in × 47.8 in)
- Location: Private collection

Otherworld is a 2002 painting by American artist Andrew Wyeth. The painting depicts Andrew Wyeth's wife and manager, Betsy Wyeth, looking out the window of a private jet. Andrew had originally titled the painting Betsy's World in reference to his famous painting Christina's World, but it was renamed Otherworld by Betsy. Visible through windows of the plane are two places commonly featured in Andrew's work: Out the left window is the Kuerner Farm in Chadds Ford, Pennsylvania and out the right window is the Olson House in Cushing, Maine. The painting's content is unusual for Wyeth, as he rarely depicted twentieth century technology or settings.

== Provenance and exhibition history ==
In 2006, Otherworld was included in the exhibition Andrew Wyeth: Memory & Magic at the Philadelphia Museum of Art. It was the first time that the painting had been shown publicly. The exhibition was the last major retrospective of Wyeth's work before his death in 2009. Otherworld was one of only two paintings in the exhibition that depicted anything from the modern world. The other painting was Wyeth's 1999 painting Renfield, in which cars and their headlights can be seen through a window.
