= Maidenhair (painting) =

Painting by Andrew Wyeth

- Artist: Andrew Wyeth
- Year: 1974
- Type: Tempera on panel
- Dimensions: 73.7 cm × 58.4 cm (29.0 in × 23.0 in)
- Location: The Andrew and Betsy Wyeth Collection

Maidenhair is a 1974 painting by the American artist Andrew Wyeth. It depicts a young bride-to-be sitting alone in the Old German Meeting House in Waldoboro, Maine.

== Creation ==
There are various stories as to how Maidenhair came to be painted. One such telling is from Andrew Wyeth’s granddaughter, Victoria, who recounts in a 1997 lecture: “Andy [was] very friendly, especially to young, attractive women.” Wyeth was searching for a new project and happened upon the German Lutheran church in Waldoboro. Inside he met a young woman with whom he began talking and discovered she was mourning her father’s death. According to Victoria, Wyeth painted her there, but during the process, the young girl became a German bride with another woman’s face donned with traditional wedding attire.

This account might seem plausible except for the fact that other sources and Wyeth’s own studies of the church’s interior and subject reveal that various models were used, accompanying figures had been introduced and then discarded, and meetinghouse historians and Wyeth biographers offer a different account and time frame for the painting. In particular, according to Wyeth biographer Timothy J. Standring, four other models were referenced in the painting Maidenhair. This reveals the process of preparatory study via sketches Wyeth produced to arrive at a final tempera painting.

In his book, Andrew Wyeth: A Secret Life, author Richard Meryman acknowledges the impetus for Maidenhair originated as a dry-brush watercolor titled Crown of Flowers, in Chadds Ford, Pennsylvania where Wyeth's hometown studio was located. Its subject model was Helga Testorf. Upon completion, Wyeth took the watercolor with him to Maine, thinking the idea could render a larger work. While there, Wyeth happened upon an Old German Church in Waldoboro, Maine and envisioned a bride alone in the front pew donned with a crown of flowers.

In an early version of Maidenhair, a gentleman by the name of Ralph Cline modeled for the bride's father, and Cline's daughter for the bride. Cline would also model for Wyeth's painting The Patriot. In the process of development, Wyeth removed the extraneous figures and used a singular model named Shirley Russel. In the end, Wyeth went with Elaine Benner, also a girl from Waldoboro, who Meryman describes as the: "Helga look-alike." Benner would also model for the painting Drumlins.

It was not until Wyeth returned to Chadds Ford in the fall of 1974 with Crown of Flowers and the finished Maidenhair that he showed them both to his wife Betsy, who titled all of Wyeth's works. "It's a good thing," granddaughter Victoria said, "When I [asked] Andy, he [gave] me ridiculous reasons for the titles."

Since the controversy of Wyeth's secret model Helga Testorf would not be discovered until 1985, a typed rolodex catalog card by Betsy first states the model for Crown of Flowers as a girl named Mary Connolly. Later, however, Wyeth would claim that it was not Connolly but another model named Mary Kahreau. Meryman relates Wyeth telling Betsy a fictitious story of how he came upon a wedding in a New England Meetinghouse where he stole away into the choir loft and painted Crown of Flowers. "The more models Wyeth used," Meryman wrote, "the more Betsy was confused." The index card for Crown of Flowers has the name "Connolly" scratched out and replaced with "Kahreau." At the bottom of the card Betsy wrote in pen: "Verso - pencil bride head." An arrow is pointing to typed wording: "(Elane (sic) Benner final model for tempura)."

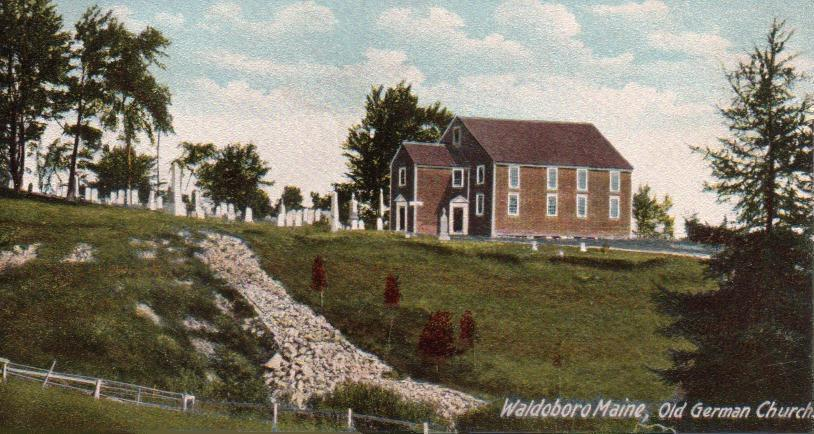
Old German Church and Cemetery

Secretary of the Ladies Auxiliary of the German Protestant Society and President of the Historical Society in Waldoboro, Maine, Jean Lawrence was the school teacher of Elaine Benner, the final model for Maidenhair. Benner once wrote to Lawrence and told of meeting Wyeth in 1974 while riding her bicycle. Benner recalls, “Andy drove by me in his Stutz Bearcat” (a popular car among celebrities). Sometime after the drive-by, Wyeth showed up at Benner’s front door and asked if she would pose for him. After a family discussion, Benner agreed. She then sat for Wyeth at the Meetinghouse for nearly a month, and then for a few days following in his studio in Cushing, Maine. Benner states that never once did she wear a crown of flowers. The dress she wore belonged to Wyeth.

In 2013, an art show at the Farnsworth Art Museum in Rockland, Maine displayed a series of sketches for selected works of Wyeth art: Chambered Nautilus, On the Edge and Maidenhair. The show revealed in particular the process of elimination Wyeth chose; in that Wyeth had previously painted two watercolors of the church’s interior with several figures in addition to the singular maiden.

The painting remains in the Andrew and Betsy Wyeth collection.

== Response and analysis ==
In an article for The Iowa Review, writer Laurie J. Murray describes the painting: "The bride-to-be in Maidenhair seems to be waiting for her betrothed, bound by religious convictions and tradition. There is no hint of celebration in the church except for the wreath of flowers and ferns upon the bride-to-be’s head." Murray also draws attention to the title by pointing out the "maidenhair" in the crown of flowers resting atop the subject's head. Mistakenly, maidenhair fern is rare to Maine and found only in the far northern regions of the state and does not flower. It is unknown where Betsy Wyeth conceived the title for Maidenhair.

Art critic, Britta Konau, compares the final painting Maidenhair to earlier Wyeth sketches: "This starkly geometric approach is reflected in the final painting, in which recession into space seems almost more important than the figure, the geometry of architecture more important than the nature just outside the window. In a way, the arrested motion and tightness of Wyeth's paintings appear diametrically opposed to the liveliness and freedom of his watercolors and drawings, but apparently he needed to work through one to arrive at the other."

The Farnsworth Art Museum has held special writing classes for students to create their own stories relating to the Wyeth painting through guided tours and historical lecturers.

== Additional reading ==
- Strandring, Timothy J (November 24, 2015). Wyeth: Andrew and Jamie in the Studio. ISBN 978-0300214215.
- Baumgartner, Karen (May 2, 2017). Andrew Wyeth: People and Places. ISBN 978-0847859085.
