= Evening at Kuerners =

Painting by Andrew Wyeth

- Artist: Andrew Wyeth
- Year: 1970
- Type: Drybrush watercolor
- Dimensions: 64.77 cm × 100.97 cm (25 1/2 in × 39 3/4 in)
- Location: Private collection

Evening at Kuerners is a 1970 painting by the American artist Andrew Wyeth. It is one of Wyeth's paintings of the Kuerner Farm in Chadds Ford, Pennsylvania. The white farmhouse and a springhouse are depicted at sunset. In the foreground are also two leafless trees and a stream of water which runs from a nearby pond.

== Creation ==
The pond to the right in the picture features in several of Wyeth's paintings. Karl Kuerner, the owner of the Kuerner Farm, got the idea to build it after his children built a small pond to play with at the same location. The pond was used to farm fish and to cut ice from in the winter. The ice was put in a nearby icehouse which worked as a refrigerator. Wyeth was fascinated by the overflow which sometimes occurred, and depicted this in several paintings, such as Dam Breast from 1970 as well as Evening at Kuerners from the same year.

Evening at Kuerners was painted with drybrush watercolor and has the dimensions 25 1/2 x 39 3/4 inches. According to his autobiography, Wyeth painted Evening at Kuerners while Karl Kuerner Jr. was very sick. The boy was tended by Helga Testorf, and Wyeth claimed to have met her for the first time while working on this painting. Testorf became one of Wyeth's most famous models in what became known as The Helga Pictures. In 1978 he would paint Overflow, one of the most famous Helga paintings, where the overflow is seen through a window behind the nude, reclining Testorf.

== Reception ==
Bruce Cole of The Wall Street Journal wrote in 2014: "In this penumbral world only the whiteness of the house, with its illuminated windows, stands out, but in an ominous, sinister way, rather like the Bates's home in Psycho." Cole wrote that the painting "evokes a sense of dread".
