= Another World =

Another World may refer to:

== Film and television ==
- Another World (1937 film), a French-German film directed by Marc Allégret and Alfred Stöger
- Another World (2021 film), a French film directed by Stéphane Brizé
- Another World (2025 film), a Hong Kong animated fantasy film
- Another World (TV series), a 1964–1999 American soap opera
- Another World (Japanese TV series), a 2019 three-episode anime spin-off from the film Hello World
- Isekai Quartet: The Movie – Another World, a 2022 Japanese animated film

== Literature ==
- Another World (novel), a 1998 novel by Pat Barker
- Another World, a 1976 memoir by Anthony Eden

== Music ==
=== Albums ===
- Another World (Andy LaVerne album) or the title song, 1977
- Another World (Brian May album) or the title song, 1998
- Another World (Gerry Rafferty album) or the title song, 2000
- Another World (John Patitucci album) or the title song, 1993
- Another World (The Roches album) or the title song, 1985
- Another World (Stan Getz album) or the title song, 1978
- Another World (EP), by Antony and the Johnsons, or the title song, 2008
- Perfecto Presents: Another World, by Paul Oakenfold, 2000
- Another World, by Astral Projection, 1999
- Another World, by W-inds, 2010
- Another World, an EP by Richard Hell, 1976

=== Songs ===
- "Another World" (The Chemical Brothers song), 2010
- "Another World" (Crystal Gayle and Gary Morris song), 1987
- "Another World" (Gackt song), 2001
- "Another World" (Sonique song), 2004
- "Another World", by Conception from The Last Sunset, 1991
- "Another World", by Gojira from Fortitude, 2021
- "Another World", by Joe Jackson from Night and Day, 1982
- "Another World", by the Kelly Family from Growin' Up, 1997
- "Another World", by Leather Strip from Underneath the Laughter, 1993
- "Another World", by One Direction, the B-side of "Gotta Be You", 2011
- "Another World", by Richard Hell and the Voidoids from Blank Generation, 1977
- "Another World", by Westlife from Where We Are, 2009

== Other uses ==
- Another World (M. C. Escher), a 1947 woodcut print by M. C. Escher
- Another World (video game), a 1991 cinematic platformer also known as Out of This World

== See also ==
- Another Earth, a 2011 American film directed by Mike Cahill
- Different World (disambiguation)
- In Another World (disambiguation)
- Multiverse
- Ni no Kuni (lit. The Another World), a Japanese series of role-playing video games
- Parallel universe (disambiguation)
- Otherworld (disambiguation)
- Un altro mondo, a 2010 Italian film by Silvio Muccino
- Un autre monde (disambiguation)
