= Kuerner Farm =

Farm in Chadds Ford, Pennsylvania

- U.S. National Register of Historic Places
- U.S. National Historic Landmark
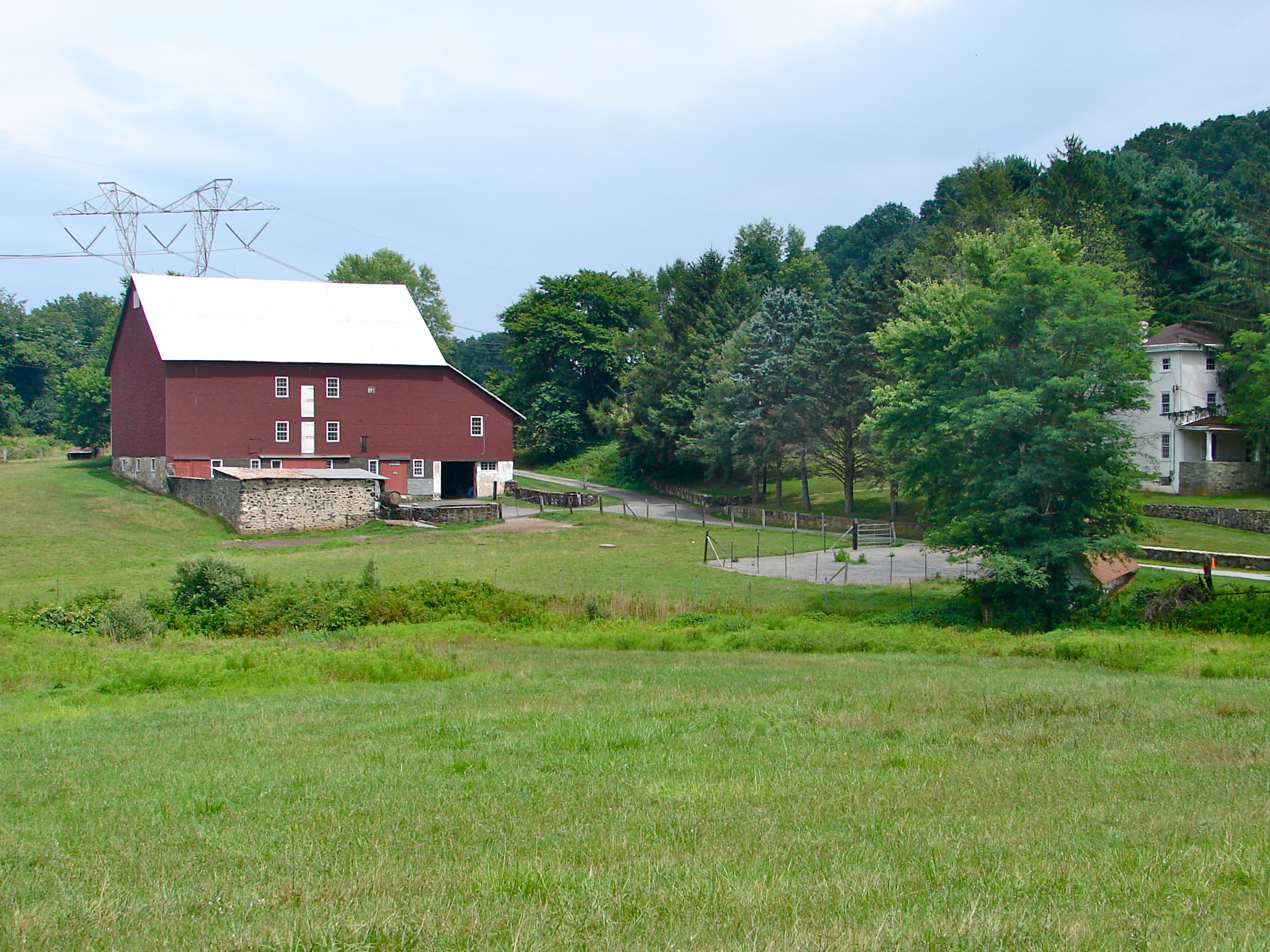

- Location within Pennsylvania Location within the United States
- Location: 415 Ring Road; Chadds Ford, Pennsylvania
- Coordinates: 39°52′09″N 75°34′32″W
- Area: 33 acres (13 ha)
- Built: c. 1814
- Architect: Caleb Ring
- Architectural style: Colonial
- NRHP reference No.: 11000564 (original); 14000924 (increase)

Significant dates
- Added to NRHP: June 23, 2011
- Boundary increase: August 25, 2014
- Designated NHL: June 23, 2011

The Kuerner Farm, also known as Ring Farm, is an historic farm in Chadds Ford, Pennsylvania, United States. It is notable for its association with artist Andrew Wyeth, who created about one-third of his work, more than 1,000 paintings and drawings, on subjects he found there during a span of seventy-seven years.

The farm was listed in the National Register of Historic Places and declared a National Historic Landmark in 2011. The property abuts the Brandywine Battlefield, another National Historic Landmark. The farm is open to public tours, operated by the Brandywine River Museum.

== History ==
The Battle of Brandywine, fought nearby on September 11, 1777, left a cannonball and grapeshot in the farm's fields. Continental troops and militia units marched past on Ring road, but no actual fighting on the property can be documented. Brandywine Battlefield State Park is about a half-mile north of the farm. Caleb Ring built the farmhouse sometime around 1814. A third story was added circa 1850.

Illustrator Howard Pyle taught art students, including Andrew Wyeth's father N. C. Wyeth, at Turner's Mill on US 1, just north of the farm, during the summers from 1898 to 1903.

In 1926, Karl Kuerner and his wife Anna rented the farm, which they bought in 1940. Karl had been a sheepherder near the Black Forest in his native Germany, and had been a machine gunner in the German Army during World War I, before moving to Philadelphia in 1926. Andrew Wyeth's first painting of the farm was completed in 1932, when Wyeth was just fifteen years old.

In 1945, N. C. Wyeth, and Andrew Wyeth's three-year-old nephew, Newell Convers Wyeth II (b. 1941) were killed when their car, stalled at the railroad crossing near the northwest corner of the farm, was struck by a train.

Andrew Wyeth met Helga Testorf in 1971 while she was nursing Karl Kuerner at the farm. A German immigrant, she lived across Ring Road from the farm with her husband. She soon began secretly modeling for Wyeth in a famous series of paintings and drawings. That year the first nude painting in the series was painted in the sewing room in the farm house. The works, numbering more than 240, remained secret until 1987, when they were exhibited at the National Gallery of Art.

Karl Kuerner died in 1979, followed by Anna in 1997. In 1999, the farm was acquired by the Brandywine Conservancy, which offers tours of the farm through its Brandywine River Museum.

It was designated as a National Historic Landmark and listed on the National Register of Historic Places in 2011. In 2014, the listing was expanded to include the former schoolhouse used by Wyeth as a studio.

== Works ==
Some of the paintings Andrew Wyeth created here include:

- Winter 1946 (1946)
- Snow Flurries (1953)
- Brown Swiss (1957)
- Groundhog Day (1959)
- Evening at Kuerners (1970)
- Young Bull (1960)
- Spring Fed (1967)
- Overflow (1978)
- Snow Hill (1989)
- Karl
- The Kuerners

It was here also that Wyeth created many of The Helga Pictures, a series of more than 200 works all involving the model Helga Testorf, whom he met while she worked as a nurse caring for the farm's owner, Karl Kuerner.

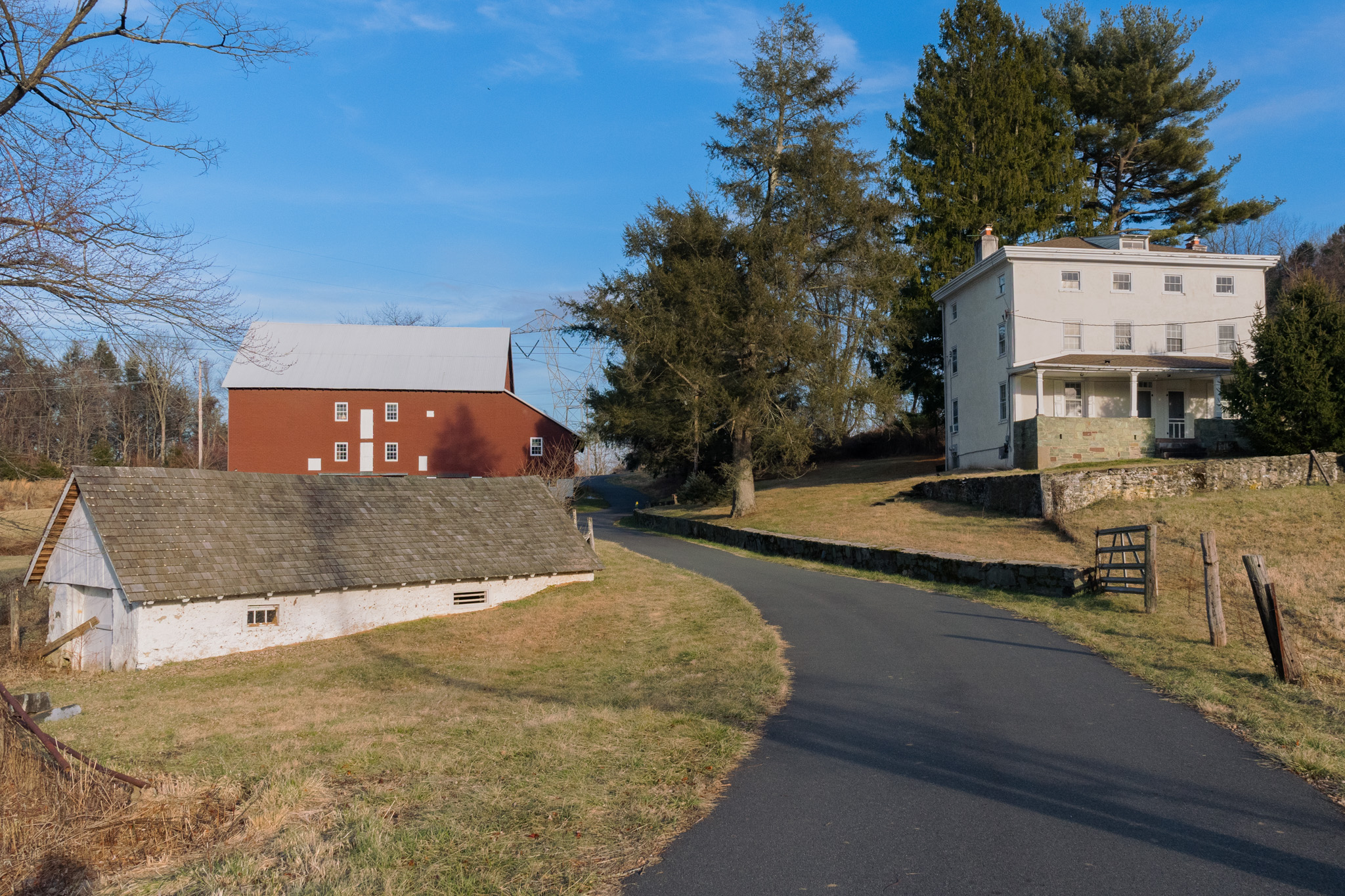
Spring house, barn & main house

== See also ==
- List of National Historic Landmarks in Pennsylvania
- National Register of Historic Places listings in Delaware County, Pennsylvania

External videos
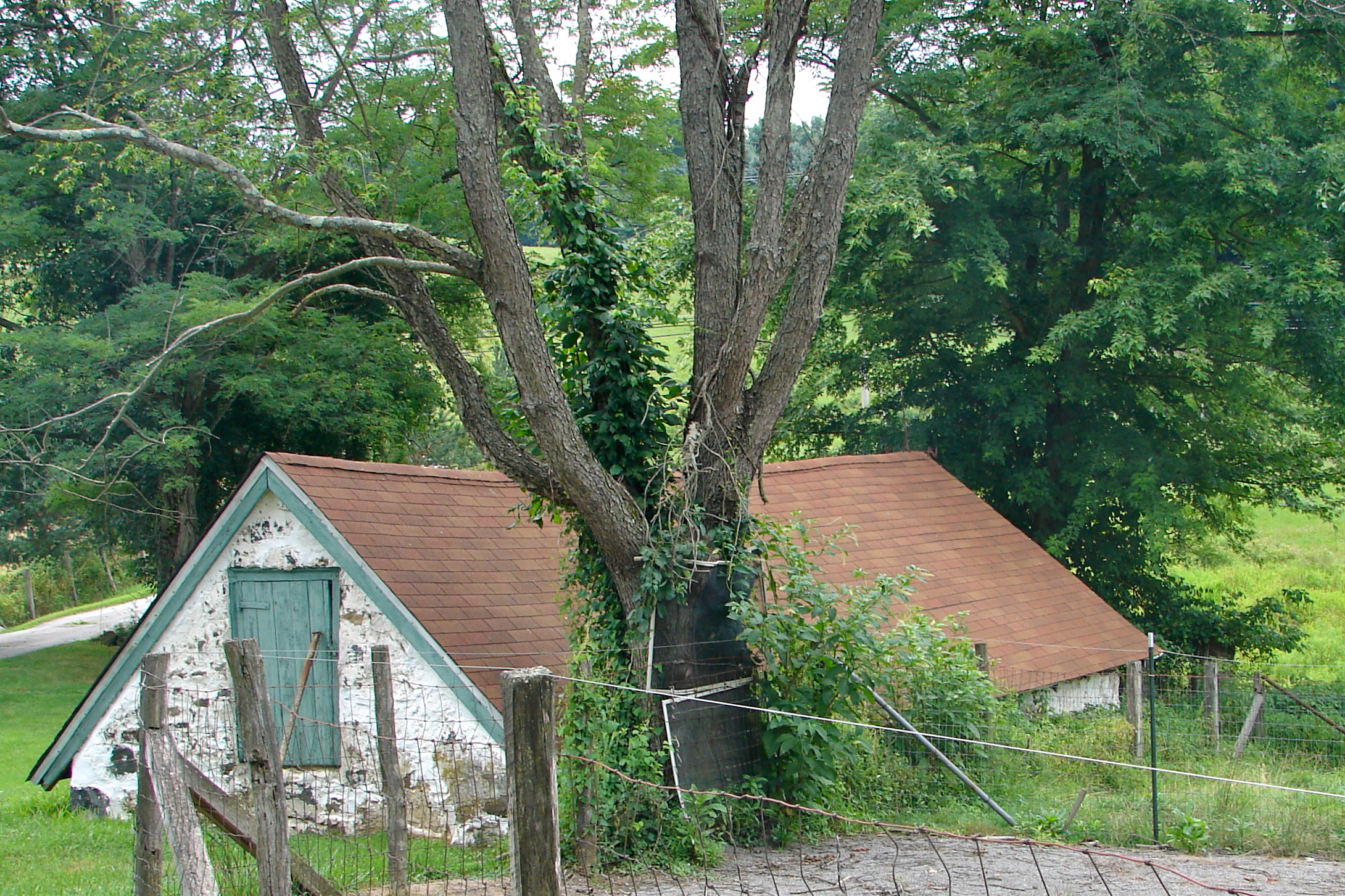
- Experience: Kuerner Farm Wyeth (3 minutes), WHYY-TV
- Andrew Wyeth Studio Tour (1:34), Wanda Kaluza
