= Otherworld (disambiguation) =

An otherworld is a term in mythology and religion for other realms of existence beyond the mortal one, where beings such as deities, spirits, fairies, and the dead may reside.

Otherworld may also refer to:

== Books and comics ==
- Otherworld (DC comics), a 2005 comics miniseries by Phil Jimenez
- Otherworld, a name for Avalon (Marvel Comics), a realm featured in Marvel Comics
- Women of the Otherworld, an urban fantasy series by Kelley Armstrong
- Otherworld, a young adult science fiction novel by Jason Segel and Kirsten Miller

== Film and television ==
- Otherworld (TV series), a 1985 American television series
- Otherworld, English title of Y Mabinogi, a 2003 Welsh film
- Otherworld, a dimension in the Dragon Ball series.

== Music ==
- Otherworld (album), a 1999 album by Lúnasa
- "Otherworld", a song on the 2000 Magica (album) by Dio
- "Otherworld", a 2001 song from Final Fantasy X Original Soundtrack
- "Otherworld", a song on the 2010 album Everything Remains (As It Never Was) by Eluveitie
- Other World (album), a 2014 album by Peter Hammill and Gary Lucas
- Other World (musical), an American musical theatre production

== Other uses ==
- Otherworld (painting), a 2002 painting by Andrew Wyeth
- Otherworld (theme park), a theme park in Dalin, Chiayi, Taiwan

== See also ==
- Category:Otherworlds
- Another World (disambiguation)
- Different World (disambiguation)
- Other Worlds (disambiguation)
