= Brinton's Mill =

- U.S. National Register of Historic Places
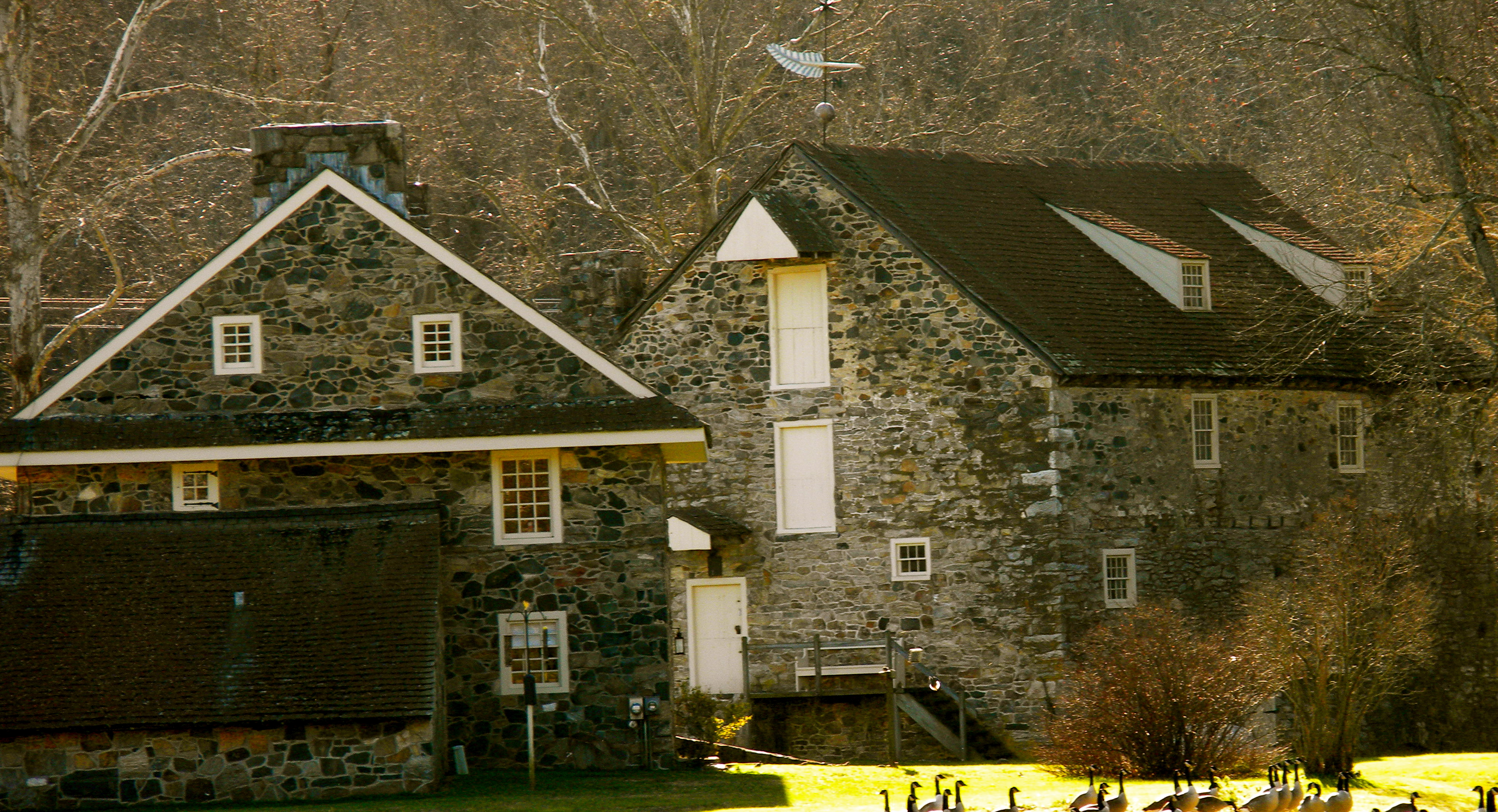
- Brinton's Mill, December 2009

- Location within Pennsylvania Location within the United States
- Location: North of Chadds Ford on Creek Road, Birmingham Township, Pennsylvania
- Coordinates: 39°53′7″N 75°36′13″W
- Area: 30.1 acres (12.2 ha)
- Built: 1720, 1769, 1824
- NRHP reference No.: 71000689
- Added to NRHP: May 27, 1971

Brinton's Mill, also known as The Mill at Brinton's Bridge, is a historic grist mill located in Birmingham Township, Chester County, Pennsylvania. The mill was built about 1720, expanded in 1769, and renovated in 1824. The granary was built about 1824, when the mill was expanded. Also on the property is a stone dwelling constructed in the 1920s and built on the foundation of an early 18th-century dwelling. During the Battle of Brandywine in September 1777, General John Sullivan and his troops were bivouacked at the adjacent Brinton's Ford. In the early 1970s, the mill property was owned by artist Andrew Wyeth. In 1958, Andrew and Betsy Wyeth purchased and restored "The Mill," a group of 18th-century buildings that appeared often in his work, including Night Sleeper (1979).

It was added to the National Register of Historic Places in 1971.
