= Public sale =

Public sale may refer to:

- An occasion when goods or property are sold in an auction
- An occasion when a company makes shares available on a stock exchange
- Public Sale (painting), a 1943 painting by the American artist Andrew Wyeth
