= Andrew Wyeth =

American visual artist (1917–2009)

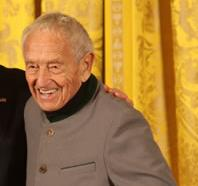
- Wyeth receiving the National Medal of Arts in 2007
- Born: Andrew Newell Wyeth; July 12, 1917; Chadds Ford, Pennsylvania, U.S.
- Died: January 16, 2009 (aged 91); Chadds Ford, Pennsylvania, U.S.
- Resting place: Hathorn Cemetery, Cushing, Maine, U.S.
- Known for: Painting
- Notable work: Christina's World
- Movement: Regionalist
- Spouse: Betsy James (m. 1940)
- Parent(s): N. C. Wyeth and Carolyn Bockius Wyeth
- Awards: Presidential Medal of Freedom

Andrew Newell Wyeth (/ˈwaɪɛθ/ WY-eth; July 12, 1917 – January 16, 2009) was an American visual artist and one of the best-known American artists of the middle 20th century. Though he considered himself to be an "abstractionist", Wyeth was primarily a realist painter who worked in a regionalist style, often painting the land and people of his hometown in Chadds Ford, Pennsylvania, and his summer home in Cushing, Maine.

His father, the illustrator and artist N. C. Wyeth, was a key member of the Brandywine School of artists and illustrators. N.C. Wyeth gave Andrew art lessons as a child, during which he developed the skills to create landscapes, illustrations, figures, and watercolor paintings. His influences included the landscape artist Winslow Homer, American philosopher and naturalist Henry David Thoreau, and filmmaker King Vidor. Wyeth's wife, Betsy, managed his career and was a strong influence in his work. His son Jamie Wyeth is also an artist.

One of the best-known images in 20th-century American art is his 1948 tempera painting Christina's World, which is in the collection of the Museum of Modern Art in New York City. He is also known for The Helga Pictures and his paintings of windows. In addition to being awarded the Congressional Gold Medal in 1988, Wyeth was the first painter to receive the Presidential Medal of Freedom and the first American artist since John Singer Sargent to be elected to the French Académie des Beaux-Arts.

== Biography ==
=== Childhood ===
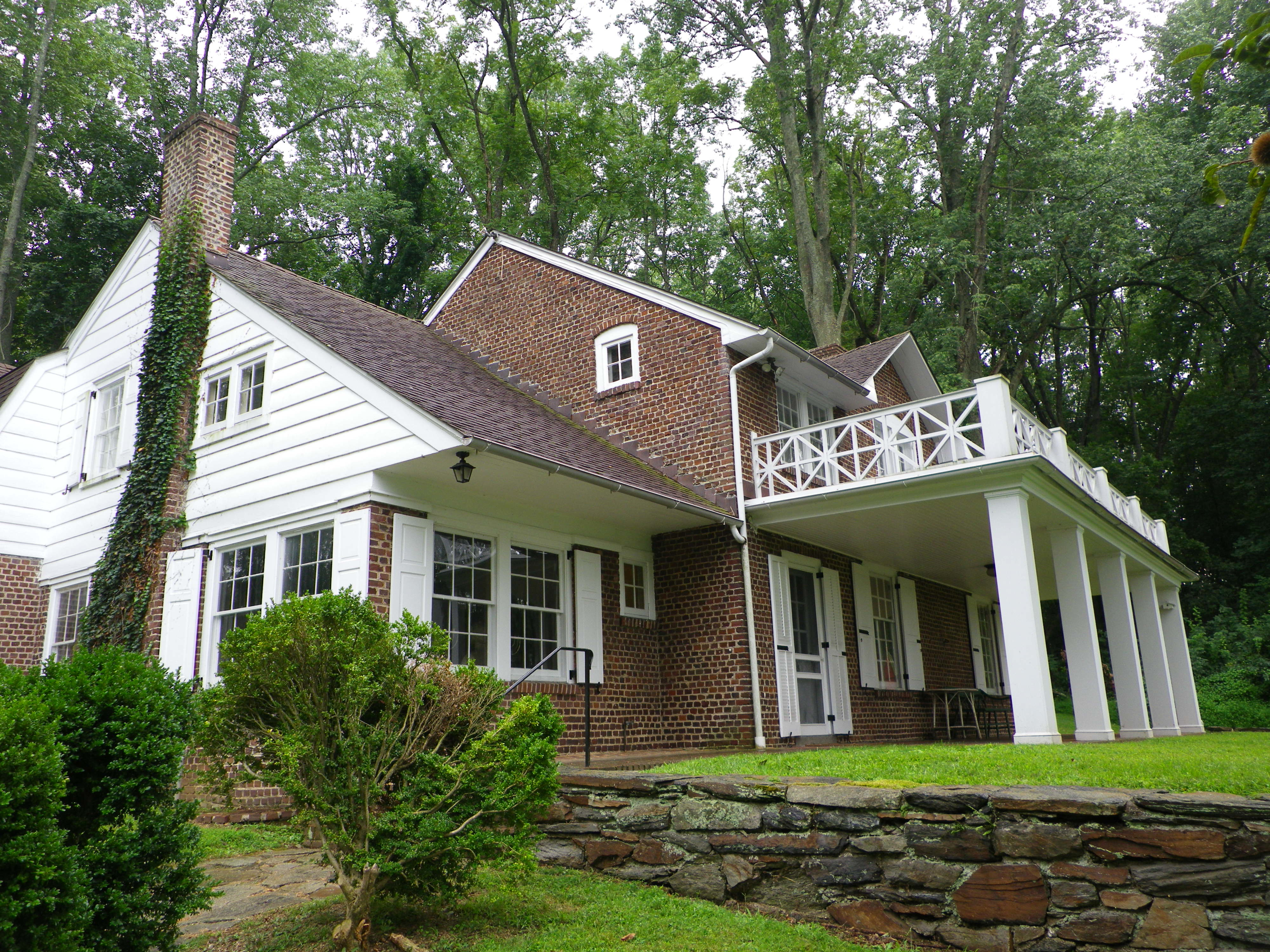
N. C. Wyeth House and Studio, designated a National Historic Landmark District in 1997.

Andrew was the youngest of the five children of illustrator and artist Newell Convers (N. C.) Wyeth and his wife, Carolyn Bockius Wyeth. He was born July 12, 1917, on the 100th anniversary of Henry David Thoreau's birth. Due to N. C. 's fond appreciation of Henry David Thoreau, he found this both coincidental and exciting. N. C. was an attentive father, fostering each of the children's interests and talents. The family was close, spending time reading together, taking walks, fostering "a closeness with nature" and developing a feeling for Wyeth family history.

Andrew was home-tutored because of his frail health. Like his father, the young Wyeth read and appreciated the poetry of Robert Frost and the writings of Henry David Thoreau and studied their relationships with nature. Music and movies also heightened his artistic sensitivity. One major influence, discussed at length by Wyeth himself, was King Vidor's The Big Parade (1925). He claimed to have seen the film, which depicted family dynamics similar to his own, "a hundred-and-eighty-times" and believed it had the greatest influence on his work. Vidor later made a documentary, The Metaphor, where he and Wyeth discuss the influence of the film on his paintings, including Winter 1946, Snow Flurries, Portrait of Ralph Kline and Afternoon Flight of a Boy up a Tree.

Wyeth's father was the only teacher that he had. Due to being schooled at home, he led both a sheltered life and one that was "obsessively focused". Wyeth recalled of that time: "Pa kept me almost in a jail, just kept me to himself in my own world, and he wouldn't let anyone in on it. I was almost made to stay in Robin Hood's Sherwood Forest with Maid Marion and the rebels."

N. C. Wyeth was an illustrator known for his work in magazines, posters and advertisements. He created illustrations for books such as Treasure Island and The Last of the Mohicans. By the 1920s, Wyeth senior had become a celebrity, and the family often had celebrities as guests, such as F. Scott Fitzgerald and Mary Pickford. The home bustled with creative activity and competition. N. C. and Carolyn's five children were all talented. Henriette Wyeth Hurd, the eldest, became a painter of portraits and still lifes. Carolyn Wyeth, the second child, was also a painter. Nathaniel Wyeth, the third child, was a successful inventor. Ann was a musician at a young age and became a composer as an adult. Andrew was the youngest child.

=== N. C. Wyeth's guidance ===
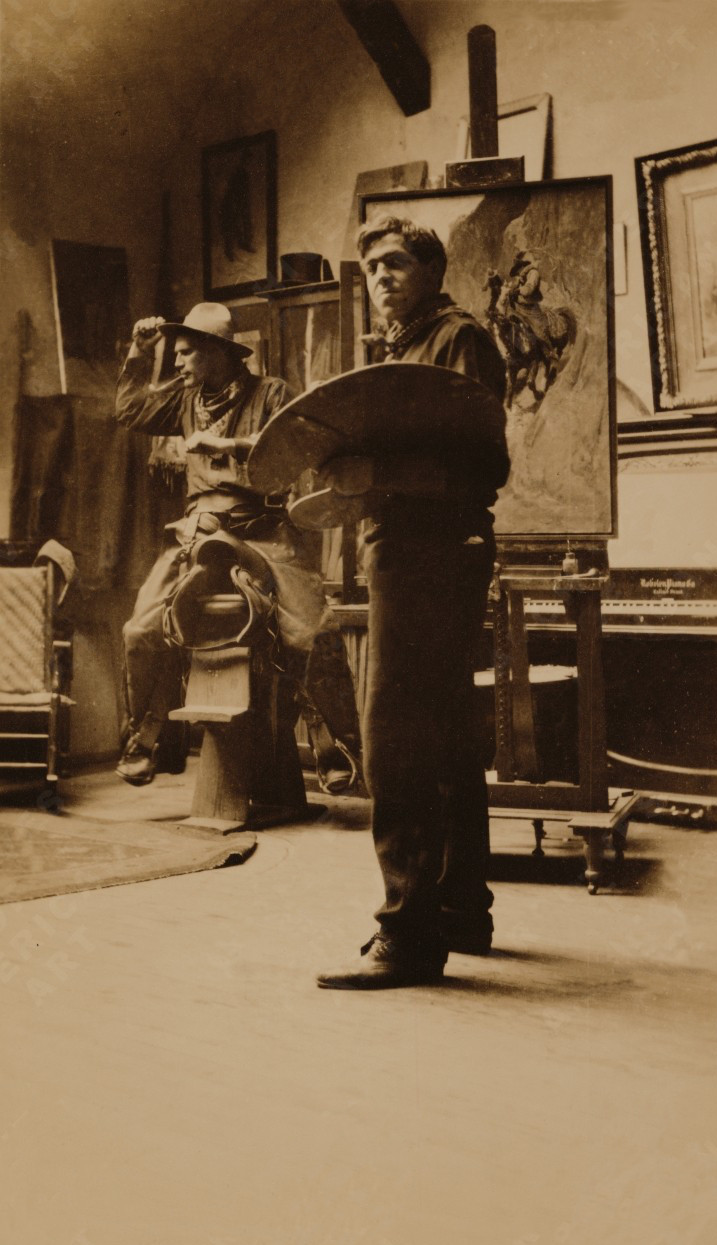
N. C. Wyeth in his studio with a cowboy model

Wyeth started drawing at a young age. He was a draftsman before he could read. By the time he was a teenager, his father, N. C. Wyeth, brought him into his studio for the only art lessons he ever had and inspired his son's love of rural landscapes, sense of romance, and artistic traditions. Although creating illustrations was not a passion he wished to pursue, Wyeth produced illustrations under his father's name while in his teens.

With his father's guidance, he mastered figure study and watercolor, and later learned egg tempera from his brother-in-law Peter Hurd. He studied art history on his own, admiring many masters of Renaissance and American painting, especially Winslow Homer.

N. C. also fostered an inner self-confidence to follow one's own talents without thought of how the work is received. N. C. wrote in a letter to Wyeth in 1944:

The great men Thoreau, Goethe, Emerson, Tolstoy forever radiate a sharp sense of that profound requirement of an artist, to fully understand that consequences of what he creates are unimportant. Let the motive for action be in the action itself and not in the event. I know from my own experience that when I create with any degree of strength and beauty I have no thought of consequences. Anyone who creates for effect—to score a hit—does not know what he is missing!

In the same letter, N. C. correlates being a great person with being a great painter: To be a great artist, he described, requires emotional depth, an openness to look beyond self to the subject, and passion. A great painting then is one that enriches and broadens one's perspective.

In October 1945, his father and his three-year-old nephew, Newell Convers Wyeth II (b. 1941), were killed when their car stalled on railroad tracks near their home and was struck by a train. Wyeth referred to his father's death as a formative emotional event in his artistic career, in addition to being a personal tragedy. Shortly afterwards, Wyeth's art consolidated into his mature and enduring style.

=== Marriage and children ===
On May 15, 1940, Wyeth married Betsy James, whom he met in 1939 in Maine. Christina Olson, who was to become the model for Christina's World, met Wyeth through an introduction by Betsy. Betsy had an influence on Andrew as strong as that of his father, such that N. C. Wyeth began to resent her. She played an important role managing his career. She was once quoted as saying, "I am a director and I had the greatest actor in the world."

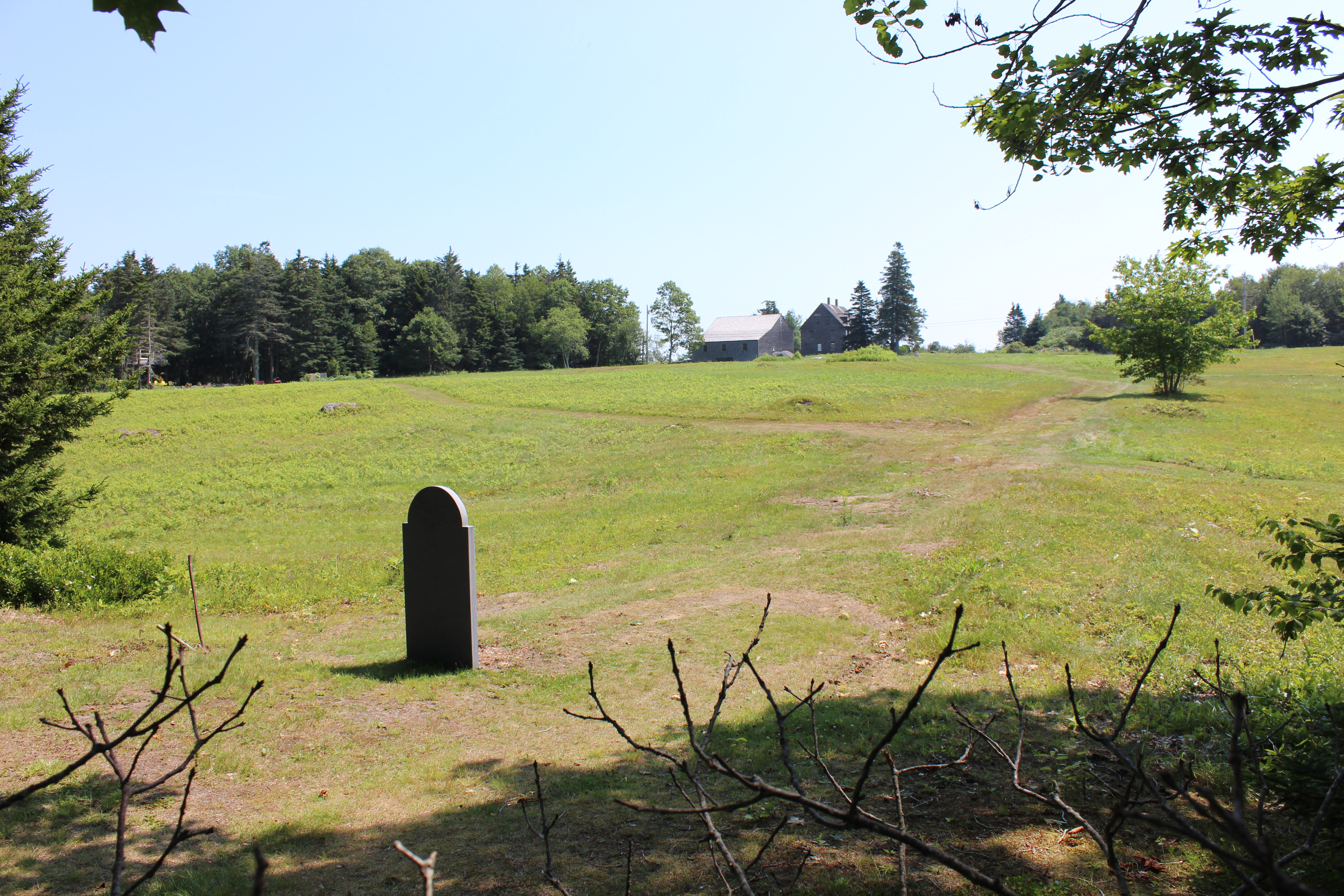
Grave of Andrew Wyeth, with the Olson House in the background, Cushing, Maine

The couple had two sons. Nicholas was born in 1943. Jamie Wyeth, born in 1946, followed his father's and grandfather's footsteps, becoming the third generation of Wyeth artists. Andrew painted portraits of both children (Nicholas and Faraway of Jamie). Andrew was the role model and teacher to his son Jamie that his father, N. C., had been to him. The artistic history is told in James H. Duff's An American Vision: Three Generations of Wyeth Art.

=== Death ===
On January 16, 2009, Andrew Wyeth died in his sleep in Chadds Ford, Pennsylvania, after a brief illness. He was 91 years old. His wife Betsy died on April 21, 2020, at the age of 98.

== Work ==
External images
- Coot Hunter (1933), Art Institute of Chicago
- Public Sale (1943), Philadelphia Museum of Art
- Winter 1946, North Carolina Museum of Art

Inspired by Winslow Homer's watercolors, Wyeth painted an impressionistic watercolor, Coot Hunter, about 1933. There he experimented with the "fleeting effects of light and movement". In 1937, at age twenty, Wyeth had his first one-man exhibition of watercolors at the Macbeth Gallery in New York City. The entire inventory of paintings sold out, and his life path seemed certain. His style was different from his father's: more spare, "drier," and more limited in color range. He stated his belief that "the great danger of the Pyle school is picture-making." He did some book illustrations in his early career, but not to the extent that N. C. Wyeth did. Public Sale (1943, Philadelphia Museum of Art), is one of his first tempera paintings.

Wyeth was a visual artist, primarily classified as a realist painter, like Winslow Homer or Thomas Eakins. In a Life magazine article in 1965, Wyeth said that although he was thought of as a realist, he thought of himself as an abstractionist: "My people, my objects breathe in a different way: there's another core—an excitement that's definitely abstract. My God, when you really begin to peer into something, a simple object, and realize the profound meaning of that thing—if you have an emotion about it, there's no end." Some feel Wyeth's work went against modernist ideals by embodying middle-class values, but this caused conversations about his work to extend beyond painting to social class.

He worked predominantly in a regionalist style. In his art, Wyeth's favorite subjects were the land and people around him, both in his hometown of Chadds Ford, Pennsylvania, and at his summer home in Cushing, Maine. In 1958, Andrew and Betsy Wyeth purchased and restored "The Mill", a group of 18th-century buildings that appeared often in his work, including Night Sleeper (1979, private collection). Brinton's Mill was added to the National Register of Historic Places in 1971.

Dividing his time between Pennsylvania and Maine, Wyeth maintained a realist painting style for over seventy years. He gravitated to several identifiable landscape subjects and models. His solitary walks were the primary means of inspiration for his landscapes. He developed an extraordinary intimacy with the land and sea and strove for a spiritual understanding based on history and unspoken emotion. He typically created dozens of studies on a subject in pencil or loosely brushed watercolor before executing a finished painting, either in watercolor, drybrush (a watercolor style in which the water is squeezed from the brush), or egg tempera. Ring Road (1985) reflects the earth tones that Wyeth used throughout his career. Raven's Grove (1985) is a prime example of Wyeth's mastery of egg tempera and his evolution as an artist.

After N. C. Wyeth's death, his work began to take on a melancholic tone. Wyeth painted Winter 1946 (1946, North Carolina Museum of Art, Raleigh, 1946), which depicts a neighbor boy, Allan Lynch, running aimlessly down a bleak hill, his hand reaching out. The location of the work was the other side of the hill where his father had died and represented the unsettling, free-falling sense of loss.

=== Christina Olson and the Olson Farm ===
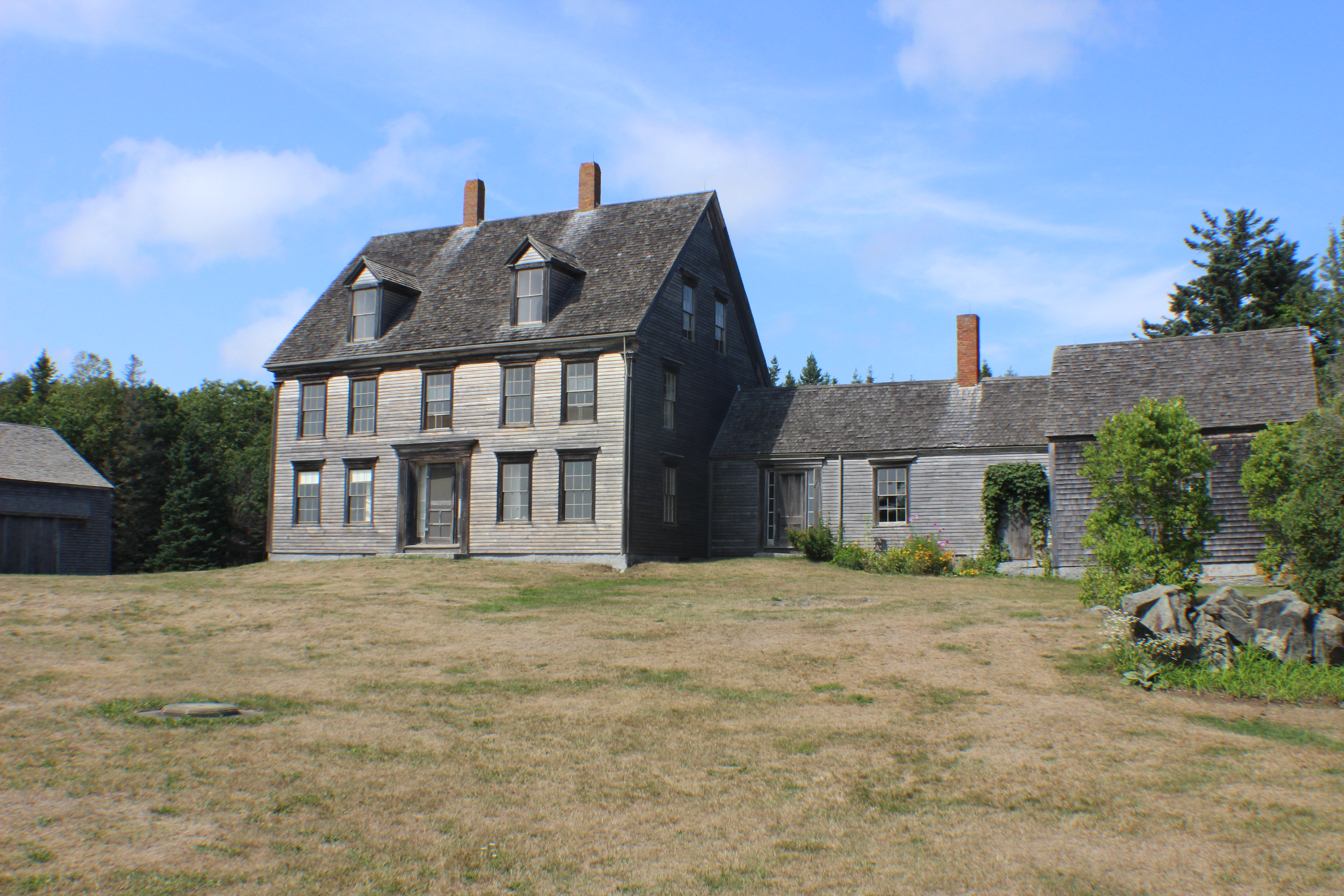
Olson House, Cushing, Maine

External images
- Christina's World (1948), The Collector
- Christina Olson, Seattle Art Museum

It was at the Olson farm in Cushing, Maine, that he painted Christina's World (1948). Perhaps his best known work, it depicts his neighbor, Christina Olson, sprawled on a dry field facing her house in the distance. Wyeth was inspired by Christina, who, crippled from (undiagnosed) Charcot–Marie–Tooth disease, a genetic polyneuropathy, and unable to walk, spent most of her time at home.

The Olson house has been preserved and renovated to match its appearance in Christina's World. It is open to the public as a part of the Farnsworth Art Museum. After being introduced to the Olsons by Betsy James, Wyeth built a friendship with the siblings and was soon allowed full roam of the farm and house where he did a number of works and studies of the Olson House and property. Because of Wyeth's profile, the property was designated a National Historic Landmark in June 2011.

=== Kuerner Farm ===
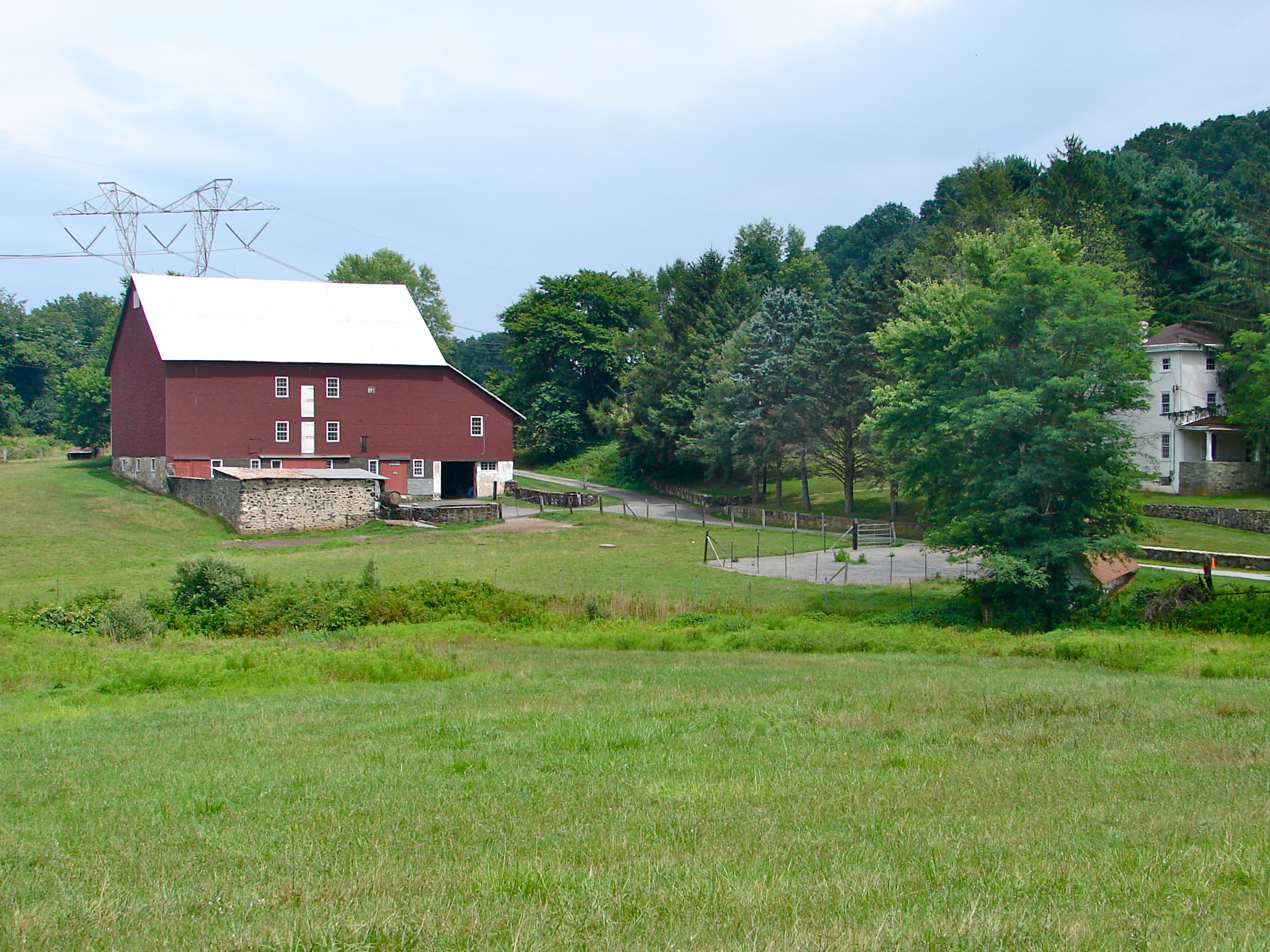
Kuerner Farm, in Chadds Ford Township, Delaware County, Pennsylvania, named a National Historic Landmark in 2011.

Wyeth began painting Anna and Karl Kuerner, his neighbors in Chadds Ford. Like the Olsons, the Kuerners and their farm were one of Wyeth's most important subjects for nearly 30 years. He stated about the Kuerner Farm, "I didn't think it a picturesque place. It just excited me, purely abstractly and purely emotionally." Brown Swiss (1957, private collection) is one of many paintings that he made from the 1950s to the 1970s of Karl and Anna Kuerner's farm in Chadds Ford. While the painting is named after the Brown Swiss cows Karl Kuerner owned, it shows the Kuerner farmhouse and the reflection of the house in the farm pond. However, Wyeth ultimately decided not to include any cows in the painting; only their tracks in the grass remain.

Chadds Ford contained a small enclave of African-Americans known as "Little Africa." The community settled around Mother Archie's Church, a Quaker schoolhouse converted to a house of worship. Andrew Wyeth painted the church in several landscapes during its active period, and the abandoned building walls appear in Ring Road (1985). African-American residents of Little Africa appear as recurring models for Wyeth's paintings. The Kuerner Farm is available to tour through the Brandywine River Museum, as is the nearby N. C. Wyeth House and Studio; in 2011, the farm was declared a National Historic Landmark, based on its association with Wyeth.

=== Helga paintings ===
Braids (1979), portrait of Helga Testorf

In 1986, extensive coverage was given to the revelation of a series of 247 studies of the German-born Helga Testorf, whom Wyeth met while she was attending to Karl Kuerner at his farm. Wyeth painted her over the period 1971 to 1985 without the knowledge of either his wife or Helga's husband, John Testorf. Helga, a caregiver with nursing experience, had never modeled before but quickly became comfortable with the long periods of posing, during which he observed and painted her in intimate detail. The Helga pictures are not an obvious psychological study of the subject, but more an extensive study of her physical landscape set within Wyeth's customary landscapes. She is nearly always portrayed as unsmiling and passive; yet, within those deliberate limitations, Wyeth manages to convey subtle qualities of character and mood, as he does in many of his best portraits. This extensive study of one subject in differing contexts and emotional states is unique in American art.

In 1986, Philadelphia publisher and millionaire Leonard E.B. Andrews (1925–2009) purchased almost the entire collection, preserving it intact. Wyeth had already given a few Helga paintings to friends, including the famous Lovers, which had been given as a gift to Wyeth's wife.

The works were exhibited at the National Gallery of Art in 1987 and in a nationwide tour. There was extensive criticism of both the 1987 exhibition and the subsequent tour. The show was "lambasted" as an "absurd error" by John Russell and an "essentially tasteless endeavor" by Jack Flam, coming to be viewed by some people as "a traumatic event for the museum." The curator, Neil Harris, labeled the show "the most polarizing National Gallery exhibition of the late 1980s," himself admitting concern over "the voyeuristic aura of the Helga exhibition."

The tour was criticized after the fact because, after it ended, the pictures' owner sold his entire cache to a Japanese company, a transaction characterized by Christopher Benfey as "crass."

In a 2007 interview, when Wyeth was asked if Helga was going to be present at his 90th birthday party, he said "Yeah, certainly. Oh, absolutely," and went on to say, "She's part of the family now. I know it shocks everyone. That's what I love about it. It really shocks 'em."

=== Window paintings ===
External images
- Wind from the Sea (1947) National Gallery of Art
- Spring Fed (1967), Brandywine River Museum of Art

Wyeth created about 300 works of art—drawings and paintings of tempera and watercolor—of windows. His son, Jaime, stated that his father was "obsessed with windows". In 2014, the National Gallery of Art held an exhibition, "Andrew Wyeth: Looking Out, Looking In", of 60 works of art that depict windows, such as Wind from the Sea (1947), Spring Fed (1967), Off at Sea (1972), and Rod and Reel (1975). Wind from the Sea depicts a breeze entering a window on the upper floor of the Olson house. It is an example of non-figurative portraiture and was a favorite of the poet Robert Frost. In 2026 the Abeno Harukas Art Museum showed a large retroprospective "Andrew Wyeth - Boundaries or Windows".

Made in Cushing, Maine and Chadds Ford, Pennsylvania over decades, the works showcase his growth as an artist. The National Gallery of Art states that the windows artwork "offer[s] the clearest understanding of Wyeth's creative process" because his paintings of people inspire questions about who the person is and what they are doing. Without the distraction of figures, the viewer is better able to assess the use of "symbolism, light, color, lines and shapes."

Wyeth illustrated different perspectives, like works of windows seen through windows, flowing curtains, and life outside the windows. Of Wind from the Sea, Wyeth said of his summer at Olson farm,

That summer in 1947 I was in one of the attic rooms feeling the dryness of everything and it was so hot I pried open a window. A west wind filled the dusty, frayed lace curtains and the delicate crocheted birds began to flutter and fly. . . . My whole idea is to keep myself open for the elusive something [that might catch me] off balance when [I] least expect it. I drew a very quick sketch and had to wait for weeks for another west wind for more studies.

=== Portraits ===
External images
- Up in the Studio (1965) (Carolyn Wyeth), Metropolitan Museum of Art
- The Patriot (1964)
- Adam (1963), Brandywine Museum of Art

Wyeth began to add portraits in the 1960s, such as Up in the Studio (1965), a drybrush portrait of his sister Carolyn. Garret Room, a painting of Wyeth's friend Tom Clark, (1962, private collection) was begun in watercolor and finished with the drybrush technique. Adam (1963, Brandywine Museum), is a tempera painting of a neighbor, Adam Johnson, who lived near Wyeth.

In works such as The Patriot (1964), a portrait of Ralph Cline, Wyeth looked beyond the surface to understand who he was painting. Cline was an interesting gentleman 71 years of age, of Native American heritage and Maine humor. He wore a big hat and overalls and chewed tobacco. It was through painting him, though, that Wyeth understood that, beneath his humor and hard countenance, Cline was a warm-hearted veteran of great dignity and intellect.

When Christina Olson died in the winter of 1969, Wyeth refocused his artistic attention upon Siri Erickson, capturing her naked innocence in The Sauna. It was a prelude to the Helga paintings.

Maidenhair (1974, Andrew and Betsy Wyeth collection), a tempera painting of a lone female figure sitting in a church pew at the Old German Meeting House in Waldoboro, Maine. It is a companion piece to Crown of Flowers.

=== Critical reaction ===
Wyeth's art has long been controversial. He developed technically beautiful works, had a large following and accrued a considerable fortune as a result. Yet critics, curators and historians have offered conflicting views about the importance of his work. Art historian Robert Rosenblum was asked in 1977 to identify the "most overrated and underrated" artists of the 20th century. He provided one name for both categories: Andrew Wyeth.

Admirers of Wyeth's art believe that his paintings, in addition to their pictorial formal beauty, contain strong emotional currents, symbolic content, and underlying abstraction. Most observers of his art agree that he is skilled at handling the medium of egg tempera (which uses egg yolk as its medium) and watercolor. Wyeth avoided using oil paints. His use of light and shadow lets the subjects illuminate the canvas. His paintings and titles suggest sound, as is implied in many paintings, including Distant Thunder (1961) and Spring Fed (1967). Christina's World became a famous image, achieving a status matched by few paintings, "that registers as an emotional and cultural reference point in the minds of millions."

Wyeth created work in sharp contrast to abstraction, which gained currency in American art and critical thinking in the middle of the 20th century.

Museum exhibitions of Wyeth's paintings have set attendance records, but many art critics have evaluated his work unfavorably. Peter Schjeldahl, art critic for The Village Voice, derided his paintings as "Formulaic stuff, not very effective even as illustrational 'realism'." Some found Wyeth's art of rural subject matter tired and oversweet.

N. C. advised Wyeth to work from one's own perspective and imagination; to work for "effect" means the artist is not fully exploring the artist’s artistic abilities and, as a result, will not realize the artist’s potential.

=== Museum collections ===
Wyeth's work is held in the following permanent collections:

- The collections of most major American museums, including the Museum of Modern Art in New York City; the National Gallery of Art; Metropolitan Museum of Art; the Whitney Museum of American Art; the Cincinnati Art Museum; the Smithsonian American Art Museum, the Nelson-Atkins Museum of Art in Kansas City; the Arkansas Art Center in Little Rock; and the Muscarelle Museum of Art in Williamsburg, VA. President George W. Bush and Laura Bush decorated a room of the White House in Washington, D.C., with Wyeth paintings from their collection.
- Especially large collections of the Brandywine Museum of Art in Chadds Ford, Pennsylvania; the Farnsworth Art Museum in Rockland, Maine; and the Greenville County Museum of Art in Greenville, South Carolina.
- Museum collections throughout the world, including the National Museum of Modern Art in Tokyo; the Hermitage Museum in St. Petersburg; the Palazzo Reale in Milan; the Académie des Beaux Arts in Paris, the Marunuma Art Park Collection, among many other museums.

== Honors and awards ==
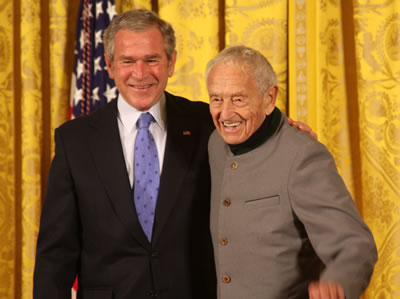
Wyeth (right) receiving the National Medal of Arts from George W. Bush in 2007.

Wyeth was the recipient of numerous honors and awards:

- 1947, the gold medal for painting from the American Academy of Arts and Letters
- 1960, elected to the American Academy of Arts and Sciences
- 1963, the first painter to receive the Presidential Medal of Freedom
- 1967, elected to the American Philosophical Society
- 1977, the first American artist since John Singer Sargent to be elected to the French Académie des Beaux-Arts
- 1980, the first living United States artist to be elected to Britain's Royal Academy
- 1987, a D.F.A. from Bates College
- 1988, the Congressional Gold Medal, the highest civilian honor bestowed by the United States legislature
- 2007, the National Medal of Arts

He also received numerous honorary degrees.

== In popular culture ==
=== Programs ===
- William E. Marks interviewed Andrew Wyeth in 1977. It aired on MVTV and included photos of Wyeth painting en plein air.
- Michael Palin in Wyeth's World, a BBC programme, was broadcast on 20 December 2013. Presenter Michael Palin examines the life and work of the artist.
- In 2018, PBS broadcast a documentary, as part of its American Masters series: Wyeth, on the artist's life and paintings.

=== References to Christina's World ===
- In "Springfield Up", a 2007 episode of The Simpsons, Mr. Burns has a painting of Christina's World in his den, except he is pictured instead.
- In the graphic novel series Preacher, issue 43 (2011) is named after the painting Christina's World. The painting is also referenced throughout the series.
- In the 2013 film Oblivion, Christina's World is featured as the fantasy image of the world.
- In the movie War on Everyone (2016), Jackie (Tessa Thompson's character) has a print of Christina's World hanging in her bedroom. While reflecting on the image, Terry (Alexander Skarsgård) "remarks on its eerie image of a young woman crawling over a grassy landscape."
- Indie singer-songwriter Ethel Cain, commonly associated with the southern gothic genre, recreated Christina's World in the music video for "American Teenager".
- 5 minutes and 50 seconds into "Raid", the tenth episode of the animated series Common Side Effects (2025), Jonas Backstein finds himself taking Christina's place in a grim imitation of Christina's World. The sky is a stormy, foreboding red, and the Olsen House has been replaced by a darkened Swiss chalet.

=== Inspired by Wyeth's works ===
- In his autobiography Man with a Camera, cinematographer Nestor Almendros cites Wyeth as one of the inspirations for the look of the film Days of Heaven (1978).
- The Helga series of paintings was the inspiration for the 1987 album Man of Colours by the Australian band Icehouse.
- The director Philip Ridley stated that his film The Reflecting Skin (1990) was inspired in its visual style by the paintings of Wyeth.
- Tom Duffield, the production designer for the American remake of The Ring (2002), was inspired by Wyeth's paintings for the look of the film.
- M. Night Shyamalan based his movie The Village (2004) on paintings by Andrew Wyeth.
- Faraway (2014), an art song inspired by Wyeth's painting Faraway.

=== Other ===
- Cartoonist Charles M. Schulz (a longtime admirer) often referred to Wyeth in his comic strip Peanuts. Snoopy's doghouse had a Van Gogh and a Wyeth painting.
- Fred Rogers, of the PBS television series Mister Rogers' Neighborhood, had a reproduction of a Wyeth painting in the entry of the studio "home".
- The street names of the neighborhood of Thunder Hill, in the village of Oakland Mills in the city of Columbia, Maryland, are derived from the paintings of Wyeth.
- Camille Grammer states (on Season 9 Episode 18 of "The Real Housewives of Beverly Hills"), that her Andrew Wyeth painting was among the few items that she took from her home when being evacuated during the Woolsey Fire in Southern California that burned down her house.
- In 2022 (Episode 9 of Season 4), of Donald Glover's TV series Atlanta is titled "Andrew Wyeth. Alfred's World."

== See also ==
- Wyeth (name), which lists the descendants of N. C. Wyeth who have Wikipedia articles

== Bibliography ==
- Duff, James H. (1987). An American Vision: Three Generations of Wyeth Art. Boston: Little Brown & Company. ISBN 0-8212-1652-X.
