= Lohorung =

Lohorung may be:

- Lohorung people, in Nepal
- Lohorung language, their Sino-Tibetan language
