= Wind from the Sea =

1947 painting by Andrew Wyeth

- Artist: Andrew Wyeth
- Year: 1947
- Type: tempera on hardboard
- Dimensions: 47 cm × 70 cm (18 1/2 in × 27 9/16 in)
- Location: National Gallery of Art; Washington, D.C.

Wind from the Sea is a 1947 painting by the American artist Andrew Wyeth. It depicts an inside view of an open attic window as the wind blows the thin and tattered curtains into the room.

The painting is housed at the National Gallery of Art in Washington, D.C., it is on view in the East Building on the Ground Level in Gallery 106C.

== Creation ==
The house belonged to Wyeth's friends Christina and Alvaro Olson who lived on the coast of Maine. The window was located in an abandoned room on the third floor. Christina Olson was a frequent model for Wyeth, and would famously appear in the painting Christina's World about a year later. After opening a dormer window to cool down the attic he was working in, Wyeth was inspired by the way the incoming breeze brought life to the tattered curtains. In an attempt to capture the moment, he made a sketch on the same sheet of paper he had been using to draw Olson.

Following the initial sketch, Wyeth spent months making studies of the window in various materials. Images of the sketch overlapping Olson and other studies in various materials are present in Anderson and Brock's Andrew Wyeth: looking out, looking in that shows Wyeth's exploration of the drapery and composition.

== Symbolism ==
Wyeth believed in the ability of ordinary things to carry symbolism, "profound meaning," and rich emotion. The same is true for Wind from the Sea. Comparing the rigid window frame to Christina's resiliency, the decaying curtains to her disability, and the crocheted birds to her delicate and surviving femininity, Wyeth considered the painting to be a symbolic portrait of her.

The decaying interior, muted colors, and view of the cemetery that Christina, Alvaro Olson, and Wyeth himself would be buried in is typical of the somber style Wyeth adopted following his father's death.

== Provenance ==
Clay Bartlett in Manchester, Vermont bought the painting from the artist in January 1947. It was sold to Charles Hill Morgan in Amherst, Massachusetts in 1952. In accordance with Morgan's will, it was on loan to the Mead Art Museum of Amherst College for 25 years following his death in 1984, after which it was donated it to the National Gallery of Art in 2009.
