= Other Worlds =

Other Worlds may refer to:

- Other Worlds (Taken by Trees album), 2012
- Other Worlds (Screaming Trees album), 1985
- Other Worlds (magazine), an American science fiction magazine
- Other Worlds (book), a 2000 non-fiction social sciences book by Charlotte Hardman
- Other Worlds, 2022 album by The Pretty Reckless
- Other Worlds, 1998 short film by Makoto Shinkai
- Other Worlds: A Stranger Things Adventure, an upcoming American television series

== See also ==
- Otherworld (disambiguation)
