= Michael Palin in Wyeth's World =

2013 documentary film

Michael Palin in Wyeth's World is a 2013 British documentary film directed by Eleanor Yule and featuring Michael Palin. It is about the American painter Andrew Wyeth and the people who inspired his paintings.

== Production ==
The film was part of a series of collaborations between Michael Palin, the director Eleanor Yule and the producer Mhairi McNeill. They began to discuss the project five years before it was made. It was filmed during three weeks in the autumn of 2013 in Pennsylvania and Maine.

== Reception ==
Yolanda Zappaterra wrote in Time Out London: "It's a fascinating life, and containing as it does interviews with Helga, Andrew's son and painter Jamie Wyeth, and Andrew himself before his death in 2009. A real treat – particularly if you're as ignorant of Wyeth's world as we were." The Independent's Gerard Gilbert called the film "unexpectedly absorbing". John Crace of The Guardian wrote that "Michael Palin in Wyeth's World (BBC2) was a little gem; a one-hour documentary about a 20th-century American painter, Andrew Wyeth, of whom I had never heard, yet which kept me intrigued".
