= German Church and Cemetery =

Historic church in Maine, United States

- U.S. National Register of Historic Places
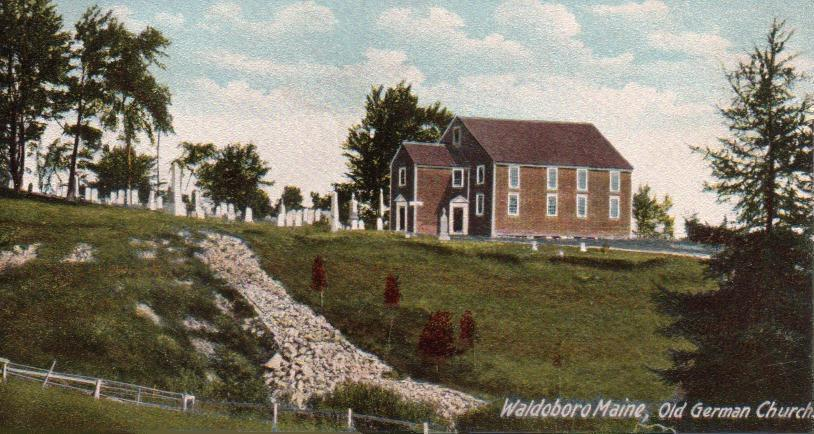

- Location within Maine Location within the United States
- Location: 235 Bremen St., Waldoboro, Maine
- Coordinates: 44°5′24″N 69°23′19″W
- Area: 24 acres (9.7 ha)
- Built: 1772
- NRHP reference No.: 70000050
- Added to NRHP: May 19, 1970

The German Church and Cemetery, also known as the Old German Meeting House, is a historic German Lutheran church and cemetery at 235 Bremen Road (Maine State Route 32) in Waldoboro, Maine. Built in 1772, it is a well-preserved 18th-century church, which played an important role in the lives of the area's early German immigrants, and in the establishment of the town of Waldoboro. It was listed on the National Register of Historic Places in 1970.

== History ==
Waldoboro was settled by four shiploads of German immigrants between 1740 and 1753 and other settlers who came from earlier settlements on the Atlantic coast. The thirty six and one-half by forty five and one-half foot church building was framed and enclosed in 1772 near the ferry landing on the east side of the Medomak River replacing their first church building, a log building at Meeting House Cove, which was dedicated in 1763. The interior remained unfinished with the worshipers sitting on "rude benches". In the winter of 1795 the building was disassembled and moved across the river to its present location and the interior was completed and the building painted by 1804. The floor plan is a common layout for church and meeting-house buildings of the period of an entrance at the opposite end from the pulpit, three aisles serving box pews and a large gallery with mostly box pews. Initially entrance is made into a small porch containing three exterior doors and two stairways. The box pews remain unpainted, the walls and woodwork above the pews painted green. The building is heated with wood stoves and has never had electric service. The pulpit stands high above the floor with a sounding board above.

The first minister was John Ulmer. From 1795 to 1811 served Rev. Frederick Augustus Rodolphus Benedectus Ritz (Retz). Next Rev. J. W. Starman served from 1812 to 1854 and instituted the first English language sermons.

The first town meeting in Waldoboro was held in this meeting house in 1773 and the centennial celebration of Waldoboro's incorporation included a sermon given in this building in 1873. One service per year is still conducted.

The oldest grave stone in the cemetery is for Fannie Miller, who died August 22, 1797. There are, however, older graves without stones.

The building and cemetery were added to the National Register of Historic Places in 1970. The building and grounds are maintained by the German Protestant Society, organized April 3, 1800.

Also noted as the final resting place of Conrad Heyer, probably the earliest photographed American, Heyer was a Revolutionary War Veteran, who possibly crossed the Delaware during the famous crossing. Heyer lived to be 106 years of age and was photographed before his death.

== In popular culture ==
American painter Andrew Wyeth utilized the interior of the Church for his 1974 painting, Maidenhair; which depicts a lone female figure sitting in a church pew donned with a crown of flowers on her head.

== See also ==
- National Register of Historic Places listings in Lincoln County, Maine
