= Different World =

Different World, A Different World, or Different Worlds may refer to:

== Books and publications ==
- Different Worlds, a roleplaying games magazine
- Different Worlds Publications, the company that publishes the magazine of the same name

== Television and film ==
- A Different World, an American TV sitcom on NBC
- Wonderful Losers: A Different World, a 2017 Lithuanian film

== Music ==
=== Albums ===
- Different Worlds: The Definitive Vandenberg, a compilation album by Vandenberg
- Different World (Uriah Heep album), a 1991 album by Uriah Heep
- Different World (Alan Walker album), a 2018 studio album by Alan Walker

=== Songs ===
- "Different World" (Iron Maiden song), 2006
- "A Different World" (song), a 2007 country song by Bucky Covington
- "A Different World", a 2016 song by Korn from the album The Serenity of Suffering
- "Different World" (Alan Walker song), 2018
- "Different World", a 1986 song by INXS from the soundtrack to Crocodile Dundee
- "Different Worlds" (Jes Hudak song), 2012
- "Different Worlds", the theme song from the American TV series Angie performed by Maureen McGovern

== See also ==
- Isekai (異世界; transl. 'different world'), a Japanese genre of fiction
- Another World (disambiguation)
- Otherworld (disambiguation)
