= Khartuwa =

Khartuwa खर्तुवा
- VDC
- Interactive map of Khartuwa
- Coordinates: 27°26′N 87°9′E
- Country: Nepal
- Zone: Kosi Zone
- District: Sankhuwasabha District
- Elevation: 1,125 m (3,691 ft)

Population (2001)
  - Total: 5,000 approx
- Time zone: UTC+5:45 (Nepal Time)

Khartuwa is a small village in the Sitalpati V.D.C. Ward no.6 of Sankhuwasabha District, located in one of the most remote part of eastern Nepal. It is situated approximately 12 km north from the headquarters Khandbari, where the people go for shopping and other daily needs. It resides calmly on the lap of mount Makalu (8462m), which is one of the highest peaks of the world. The village is rich in forest and water resources.

== Community ==
The village is mainly occupied by the Lohorung community and has a population of about 500 people. The community living in Khartuwa are mostly dependent on agriculture. Most of young people are working abroad in foreign countries like Arab countries, the United Kingdom, the United States and Australia.

== Public amenities ==
There is one primary school named Bal Balika Primary School, but there is no high school in the village, meaning the students have to travel to nearby high schools viz. Aangla School or Chandanpur School after they cross primary level (i.e. 5th grade). It does not have proper transportation facility. However, a gravel road is under construction. There is also a temple called Mahadevthaan and a natural stone sprout called Dhyaadhara from where the village people fetch water for drinking and washing purposes.

== Daily life ==
The Lohorung people of this village spend most of their time doing household activities such as cooking meal, feeding domestic animals, fetching drinking water. Their daily mode of life is based on agriculture. They plant crops like paddy, wheat, millet etc. according to the seasonal calendar. The female member usually do the household chores and the male member do the outdoor works such as ploughing the rice fields, irrigating the fields.
