= Raymond Cazallis Davis =

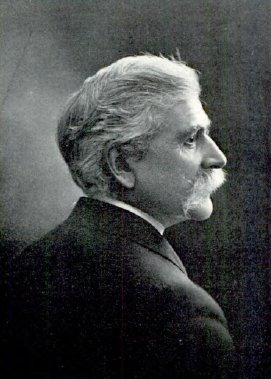
Raymond Cazallis Davis, circa 1906

Raymond Cazallis Davis (June 23, 1836 – June 10, 1919) was the chief librarian at the University of Michigan for 28 years. He was the first to teach bibliography.

== Early life ==
Davis was born in Cushing, Maine, on June 23, 1836. His parents were George Davis and Catherine (Young) Davis. His father is of English and Welsh ancestry and his mother of Scotch and Irish. Davis's father was a sea captain. In 1849 when Davis was 13 years old, his father then took him on a two-year world tour.

== Career ==
After returning from his world adventures Davis prepared for college. In 1855 he became a student at the University of Michigan. After two years at the university he became seriously ill. Because of his illness he was not able to continue his studies or take employment. He regained his health and got a job in short sea shipping.

In 1868 Davis returned to the University of Michigan and got a position as an assistant librarian through 1872. At that time then he returned to Maine and was employed in local shipping. In 1877 he was offered the chief librarian position at the University of Michigan, which he accepted. During 1878, he taught bibliography.

He was a key force in the construction of the university's first library building, which opened in 1883. Through his efforts the library grew in size and became an instrumental part of the university.

== Later life and death ==
Davis again became seriously ill and was forced into retirement in 1905 after 28 years as a librarian at the University of Michigan. However, he did continue to lecture on bibliography into 1914, until his illness forced him to quit altogether. He died on June 10, 1919, at Ann Arbor.

== Works ==
- Reminiscences of a Voyage around the World (1869), based on his boyhood experiences.

== Sources ==
- Abbott, John C. (February 2000). "Davis, Raymond Cazallis". American National Biography Online. Oxford University Press.
- Alumni (1920). Michigan Alumnus. Alumni Association of the University of Michigan.
- Hinsdale, Burke Aaron (1906). History of the University of Michigan. University. p. 275.
- Kane, Joseph Nathan (1997). Famous First Facts, Fifth Edition. The H. W. Wilson Company. item 2198. ISBN 0-8242-0930-3. "The first bibliography course at a college was offered in 1878 by the University of Michigan at Ann Arbor, MI. Raymond Cazallis Davis, the librarian, gave a lecture once a week during November and December."
