= In Another World =

In Another World may refer to:

- In Another World (Cheap Trick album), 2021
- In Another World (Joe Diffie album), 2001
  - "In Another World" (Joe Diffie song), the title track
- "In Another World" (Ejae song), 2025
