= Farnsworth Art Museum =

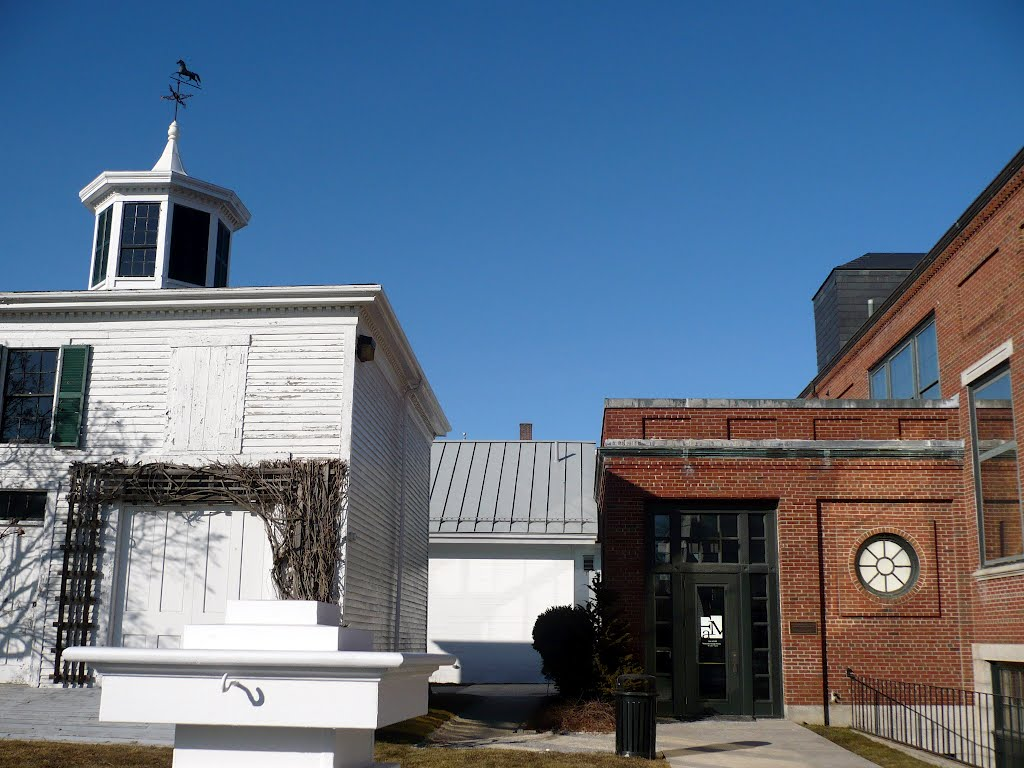
- Established: 1948
- Location: 16 Museum Street; Rockland, Maine
- Coordinates: 44°06′13″N 69°06′35″W
- Type: Art Museum
- Website: www.farnsworthmuseum.org

The Farnsworth Art Museum in Rockland, Maine, United States, is an art museum that specializes in American art. Its permanent collection includes works by such artists as Gilbert Stuart, Thomas Sully, Thomas Eakins, Winslow Homer, George Bellows, Rockwell Kent, Eastman Johnson, Fitz Henry Lane, Frank Benson, Childe Hassam, Will Barnet, and Maurice Prendergast, as well as a significant collection of works by the 20th-century sculptor Louise Nevelson. Four galleries are devoted to contemporary art.

The museum's mission is to celebrate Maine's role in American art. It has one of the nation's largest collections of the paintings of the Wyeth family: N.C. Wyeth, Andrew Wyeth, and Jamie Wyeth. The museum owns and operates the Olson House in Cushing, inspiration for Andrew Wyeth's Christina's World painting. The museum also owns the Farnsworth Homestead, the Rockland home of its founder Lucy Farnsworth.

The museum's building was built in 1948 to designs by Wadsworth, Boston & Tuttle of Portland.

== See also ==
- Brandywine River Museum
