= Olson House (Cushing, Maine) =

Historic house in Maine, United States

- U.S. National Register of Historic Places
- U.S. National Historic Landmark
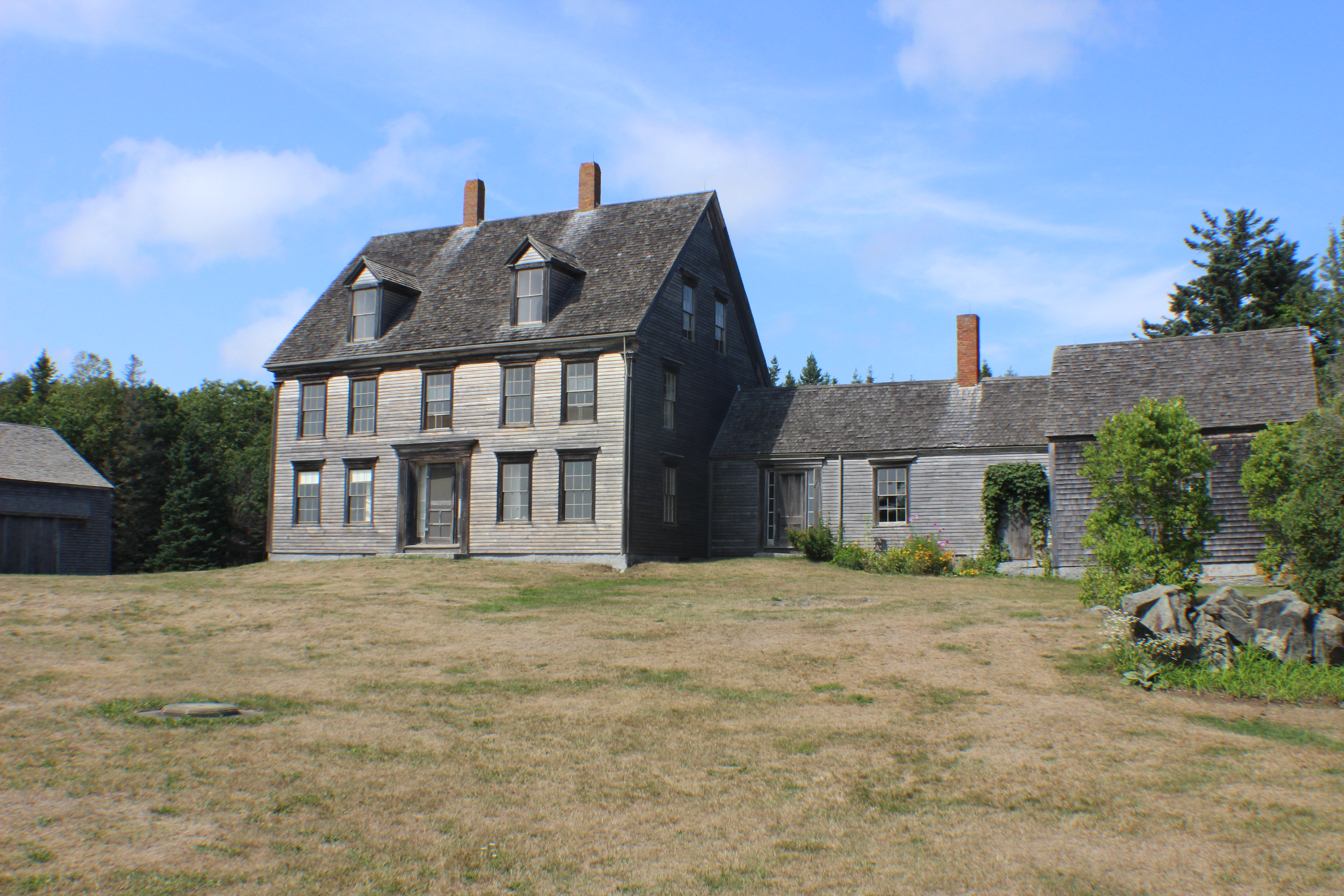
- Olson House in 2018

- Location within Maine Location within the United States
- Nearest city: Hathorne Point Road, Cushing, Maine
- Coordinates: 43°58′54″N 69°16′07″W
- Architectural style: Colonial
- NRHP reference No.: 93001114

Significant dates
- Added to NRHP: August 31, 1995
- Designated NHL: June 23, 2011

Olson House is a 14-room Colonial farmhouse in Cushing, Maine. The house was made famous by its depiction in Andrew Wyeth's Christina's World. The house and its occupants, Christina and Alvaro Olson, were depicted in numerous paintings and sketches by Wyeth from 1939 to 1968. The house was designated as a National Historic Landmark in June 2011. The Farnsworth Art Museum owns the house; it is open to the public.

== Early history ==
The Hathorn-Olson House was built in the late 1700s by Captain Samuel Hathorn II (b abt. 1750). The house was substantially altered in 1871 by Captain Samuel Hathorn IV (1822–1892). The 1871 alterations included the addition of several bedrooms on the third floor and the construction of a steeply pitched roof. The property was inherited in 1929 by Christina Olson and Alvaro Olson from their mother Katie Hathorn (b. Feb. 15 1858 – d. Nov. 1929), a descendant of Captain Hathorn.

== Association with Wyeth ==
Between 1939 and 1968, the house was depicted in paintings and sketches by the American artist Andrew Wyeth, including his 1948 masterpiece, Christina's World. Wyeth was inspired to paint Christina's World by the story of Christina Olson, who had lost the use of her legs to, at the time unknown, Charcot—Marie—Tooth disease.

Wyeth befriended the Olsons and maintained a studio in the house. Wyeth later recalled, "I just couldn't stay away from there. I did other pictures while I knew them but I'd always seem to gravitate back to the house." Christina and Alvaro Olson lived at the house until they died in 1968 and 1967, respectively. The Olsons, as well as Andrew Wyeth, are buried in the Olson family cemetery on the property.

== Later years ==
After Christina's death, the house was purchased in 1968 by movie director Joseph E. Levine, who was an admirer of Wyeth's work. Levine operated the house as a museum for two years starting in 1971 but the operation met with opposition from local residents. In 1974, Levine announced that he would give the property to the State of Maine, but Levine withdrew the offer in 1975 over concerns that the state lacked funding to maintain the property. The house was purchased by Apple Inc. CEO John Sculley, who put the house up for sale in 1989. Sculley eventually donated the house to the Farnsworth Art Museum in 1991.

The Olson House remains under the ownership of the Farnsworth Art Museum, which maintains it as a facility that is open for public visitation. Farnsworth executive director Christopher Brownawell noted, "This nondescript saltwater farmhouse and its connecting structure has become one of the most recognized images in American art."

== Historic designation ==
The building was listed on the National Register of Historic Places in 1995 and designated as a National Historic Landmark in 2011.

== See also ==
- List of National Historic Landmarks in Maine
- National Register of Historic Places listings in Knox County, Maine
