= Betsy Wyeth =

American author and collector (1921–2020)

Betsy James Wyeth
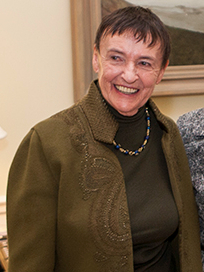
- Born: Betsy Merle James; September 26, 1921; East Aurora, New York
- Died: April 21, 2020 (aged 98); Chadds Ford, Pennsylvania
- Resting place: Hathorn Cemetery, Cushing, Maine
- Education: Colby Sawyer College, University of Chicago, B.A.
- Occupations: Author, art collector, business manager, archivist
- Organization: Wyeth Foundation for American Art
- Spouse: Andrew Wyeth (married 15 May 1940)
- Children: 2 (Nicholas Wyeth and Jamie Wyeth)

Betsy James Wyeth (née Betsy Merle James; 26 September 1921 – 21 April 2020) was an author and art collector. She was also the business manager and archivist of her husband, artist Andrew Wyeth.

== Early life ==
Betsy Merle James was born on 26 September 1921 in East Aurora, New York. She was the youngest of three daughters born to Elizabeth Browning, a graduate of Cornell and teacher of Latin, and Merle Davis James, an artist and printer.

She attended Colby Junior College, before transferring to the University of Chicago, where she studied archaeology. In 1939, aged 17, she met 22 year old Andrew Wyeth. They became engaged within a week of meeting, and married on 15 May 1940. They settled in Chadds Ford, Pennsylvania. The couple had two sons, Nicholas and Jamie.

== Artistic collaboration ==
Prior to their marriage, Betsy introduced Andrew Wyeth to the Olsons, a brother and sister. Anna Christina Olson, paralyzed from the waist down, became the subject of one of Andrew Wyeth's best known works, titled Christina's World by Betsy. Their son, Jamie, later said "I always felt her signature should be alongside his." Andrew Wyeth said of his wife that she "made me into a painter I would not have been otherwise".

Betsy Wyeth became her husband's business manager, negotiating commissions, organizing shows, and maintaining his catalogue raisonné. She described her role as like that of a film director. She also regularly modelled for her husband, and was the subject of the portrait Maga’s Daughter.

Betsy Wyeth collected the letters of her father-in-law into a book, The Wyeths: The Letters of N.C. Wyeth, 1901-1945. An artist like his son, the book helped to catalyze a reassessment of his career. She wrote two books on Andrew Wyeth's work: Wyeth at Kuerners (1976), and Christina’s World (1982), and assisted in the 1995 documentary Andrew Wyeth Self Portrait: Snow Hill.

The Wyeths were significant benefactors in art and education. In 1968, they founded the Wyeth Endowment for American Art (later the Wyeth Foundation for American Art). Following Andrew Wyeth's death in 2009, Betsy Wyeth gifted his studio to the Brandywine River Museum of Art.

== Preservation efforts ==
Betsy Wyeth was a defender and restorer of the Brandywine region's vernacular architecture. She helped to save a 19th-century gristmill by encouraging a neighbour, George Weymouth, to buy it and turn it into a museum. This opened in 1971 as the Brandywine River Museum (now known as the Brandywine Museum of Art). Wyeth also restored the old mill complex on the Brandywine River which became the couple's home and studio.

In Knox County, Maine, she bought three islands (Southern, Allen, and Benner), on one of which she restored a lighthouse. Andrew Wyeth called the area "Betsy’s Village". In 2008, she bought an old sail loft, previously dismantled in Port Clyde. She had it put back together on one of the three islands, as a birthday gift for her husband. The sail loft became the subject of one of Andrew Wyeth's paintings, and was renamed Goodbye by Betsy following his death. Allen and Benner islands were acquired by Colby College in 2022.

Betsy Wyeth was a founding member of the Chadds Ford Historical Society, and a driving force in the creation of Island Journal. In 1987, she founded Up East Incorporated, to support environmental research, preservation, and education in Maine.

== Death and legacy ==
Betsy Wyeth died aged 98 on 21 April 2020 at her home in Chadds Ford, Pennsylvania. The Philadelphia Inquirer remembered her as "the chief architect of the Wyeth mystique".

Between 2020 and 2021, the Brandywine Museum of Art paid tribute to Betsy Wyeth's legacy with a display of 20 drawings and paintings of and about her. In 2022, The Farnsworth Museum in Rockland, Maine staged an exhibition titled Betsy's Gift.

A scholarship in her name, The Betsy James Wyeth Fellowship in Native American Art, is distributed by The Wyeth Foundation for American Art. Since its formation in 2002, the Foundation has provided more than $10 million in financial support for art and artists.

== Bibliography ==
- The Wyeths: The Letters of N.C. Wyeth, 1901-1945 (1970)
- Wyeth at Kuerners (1976)
- The Stray (1979)
- Christina’s World (1982)
