= Winter 1946 =

1946 painting by Andrew Wyeth

- Artist: Andrew Wyeth
- Year: 1946
- Type: Tempera on board
- Dimensions: 79.7 cm × 121.9 cm (31 3/8 in × 48 in)
- Location: North Carolina Museum of Art, Raleigh, North Carolina

Winter 1946 is a 1946 painting by the American artist Andrew Wyeth. It depicts a boy running down a hill in the winter.

The painting is housed at the North Carolina Museum of Art in Raleigh, North Carolina.

== Creation ==
According to the Wyeth, he worked on the painting for the whole winter of 1946. It was the first tempera painting he made after the death of his father, N. C. Wyeth, who was hit by a train. Andrew Wyeth said about the picture: "It was me, at a loss—that hand drifting in the air was my free soul, groping." Behind the hill was the location where Wyeth's father had died. Wyeth said he regretted that he never had painted his father's portrait, but that "the hill finally became a portrait of him".
