= Public Sale (painting) =

1943 painting by Andrew Wyeth

- Artist: Andrew Wyeth
- Year: 1943
- Medium: Tempera on panel
- Dimensions: 56 cm × 122 cm (22 in × 48 in)
- Location: Philadelphia Museum of Art, Philadelphia

Public Sale is a 1943 painting by the American artist Andrew Wyeth. It shows two men by a car and in the distance a crowd of people outside a farm building. The event depicted is the forced auction of a farm after the farmer's wife had died.

The painting belongs to the Philadelphia Museum of Art since 2000. As of 2016, it is currently not on view.

== Reception ==
Ken Johnson of The New York Times singled the painting out as unusual in Wyeth's oeuvre because it "evinces social consciousness", something that otherwise is absent from the artist's works and makes him different from his contemporary Norman Rockwell. Johnson, reviewing a Wyeth exhibition in 2006, likened Public Sale to "an understated Thomas Hart Benton painting".
