= Abeno Harukas Art Museum =

- あべのハルカス美術館
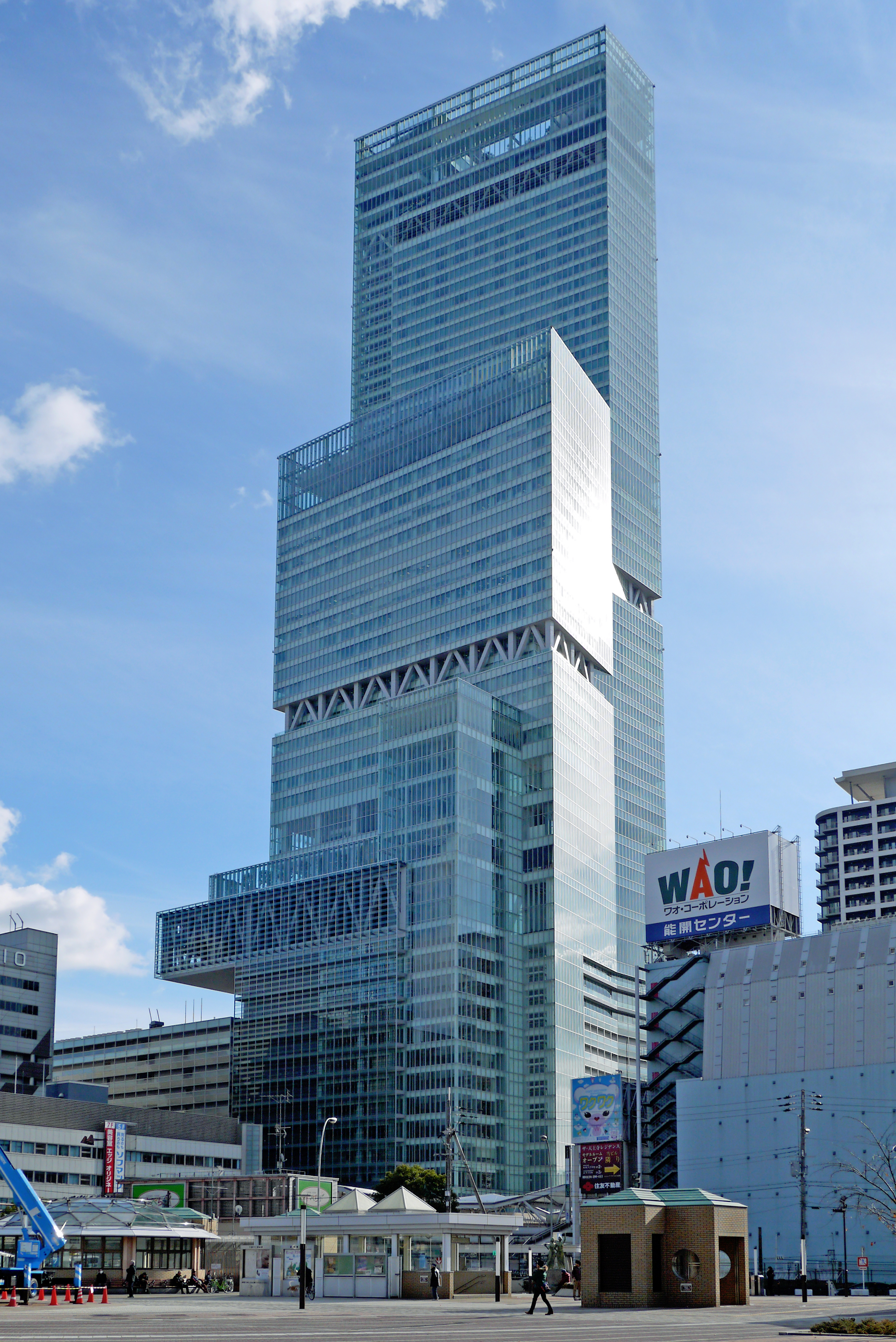
- Abeno Harukas, Japan's tallest building; Abeno Harukas Art Museum is on the sixteenth floor
- Interactive map of the Abeno Harukas Art Museum area

General information
- Location: 1-1-43 Abenosuji, Abeno-ku, Ōsaka, Ōsaka Prefecture, Japan
- Coordinates: 34°38′45″N 135°30′51″E
- Opened: March 2014

Technical details
- Floor area: 880 m^{2} (exhibition hall)

Website
- www.aham.jp

Abeno Harukas Art Museum (あべのハルカス美術館, Abeno Harukasu Bijutsukan) opened in Abeno-ku, Ōsaka, Japan, in 2014. Specializing in temporary exhibitions, it is located on the 16th floor of Abeno Harukas, Japan's tallest building, named after the ward of Abeno and the expression harukasu (晴るかす), meaning 'brightening up'. The Museum's inaugural director is art historian Asano Shūgō (浅野秀剛), director of Kintetsu Railway Company's other cultural initiative, the Yamato Bunkakan.

== List of exhibitions ==
Exhibitions have had as their subject:

2014: Tōdai-ji; Collection of Museo Poldi Pezzoli; Dufy; Neo-impressionism
2015: Treasures from Mount Kōya; Kawakita Handeishi (川喜田半泥子); Treasures from Kotohira-gū; Tove Jansson; Ukiyo-e from the Philadelphia Museum of Art; Museum of Magic
2016: Museum of Magic; Treasures from Hase-dera; Picasso; Star Wars; Yōkai; Munakata Shikō
2017: Munakata Shikō; Renoir; Matisse and Roualt; Kitano Tsunetomi (北野恒富); Treasures from Saidai-ji; Hokusai (with the British Museum); Studio Ghibli
2018: Studio Ghibli; Tōgō Seiji; Works by Harunobu from the Museum of Fine Arts, Boston; Learn and Play!; Tower of the Sun; Works by M. C. Escher from the Israel Museum, Jerusalem
2019: Works by M. C. Escher from the Israel Museum, Jerusalem; Japanese crafts from the Meiji period to today; Winnie the Pooh; Gustave Moreau; The Pre-Raphaelites; Caravaggio
2020: Caravaggio; Treasures from Yakushi-ji; Anno Mitsumasa; Moomin the Art and Story; Masters of Edo Painting; Atsuhiko Misawa
2021: Treasures of the Prince of Liechtenstein; 160th Anniversary of Grandma Moses; Masterpieces of the Pola Museum of Art; Tupera Tupera; The collection of Fukutomi Taro
2022: Impressionist Masterworks from The Israel Museum; Hideaki Anno; 120th anniversary of Peter Rabbit; Kazuo Umezz, The art of Alice's Adventures in Wonderland
2023: The genius of Ekin; Contemporary Art inspired by Meiji crafts; Mitsumasa Anno; Junko Koshino
2024: 10th Anniversary of Abeno Harukas; Enku; Tokugawa Art Museum exhibition

== See also ==
- Yamato Bunkakan
