= Lohorung people =

Lohorung
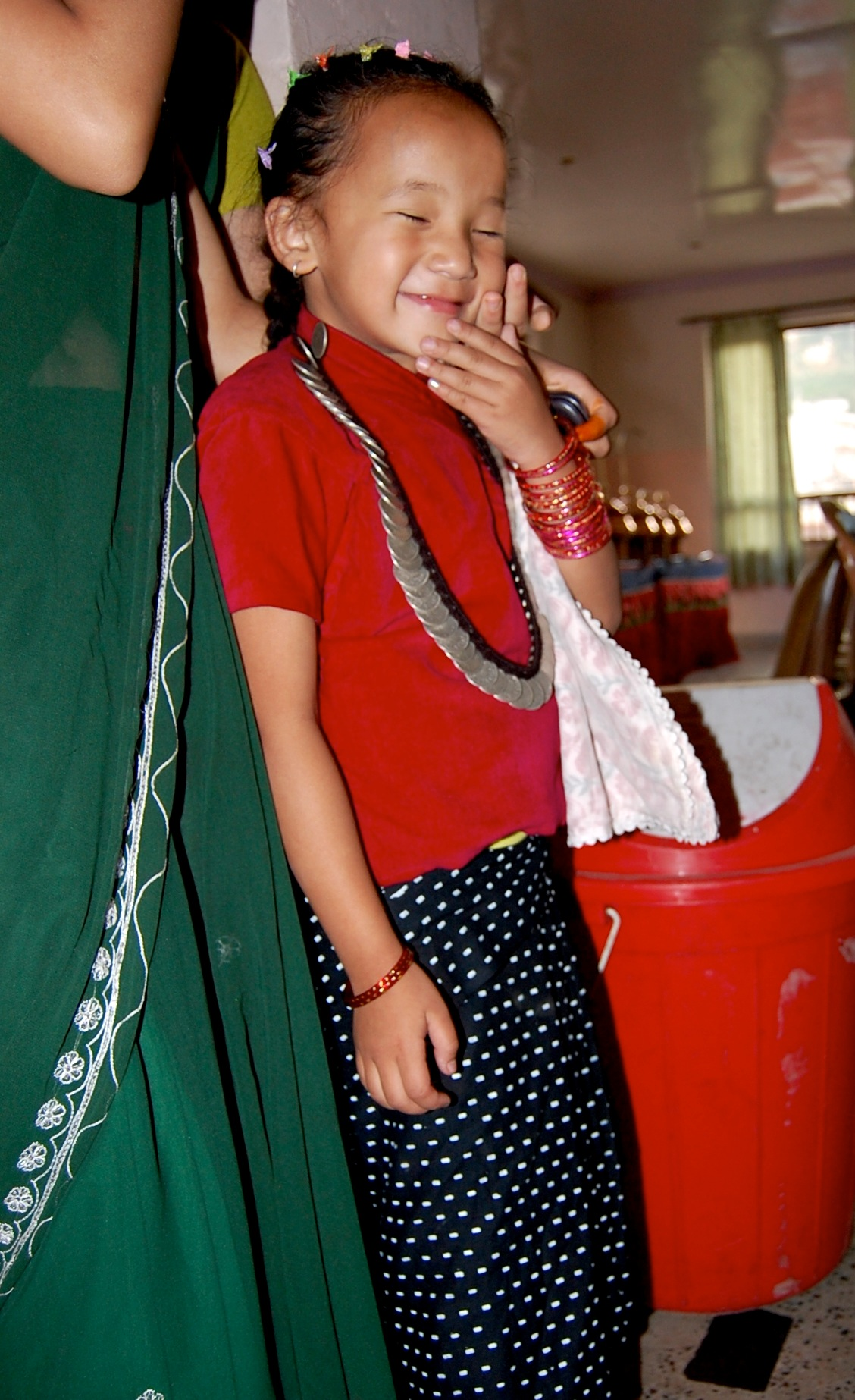
- A Lohorung girl at Kathmandu

Regions with significant populations
- Nepal

Languages
- Lohorung language

Religion
- Kiratism, Hinduism

Related ethnic groups
- kirati people

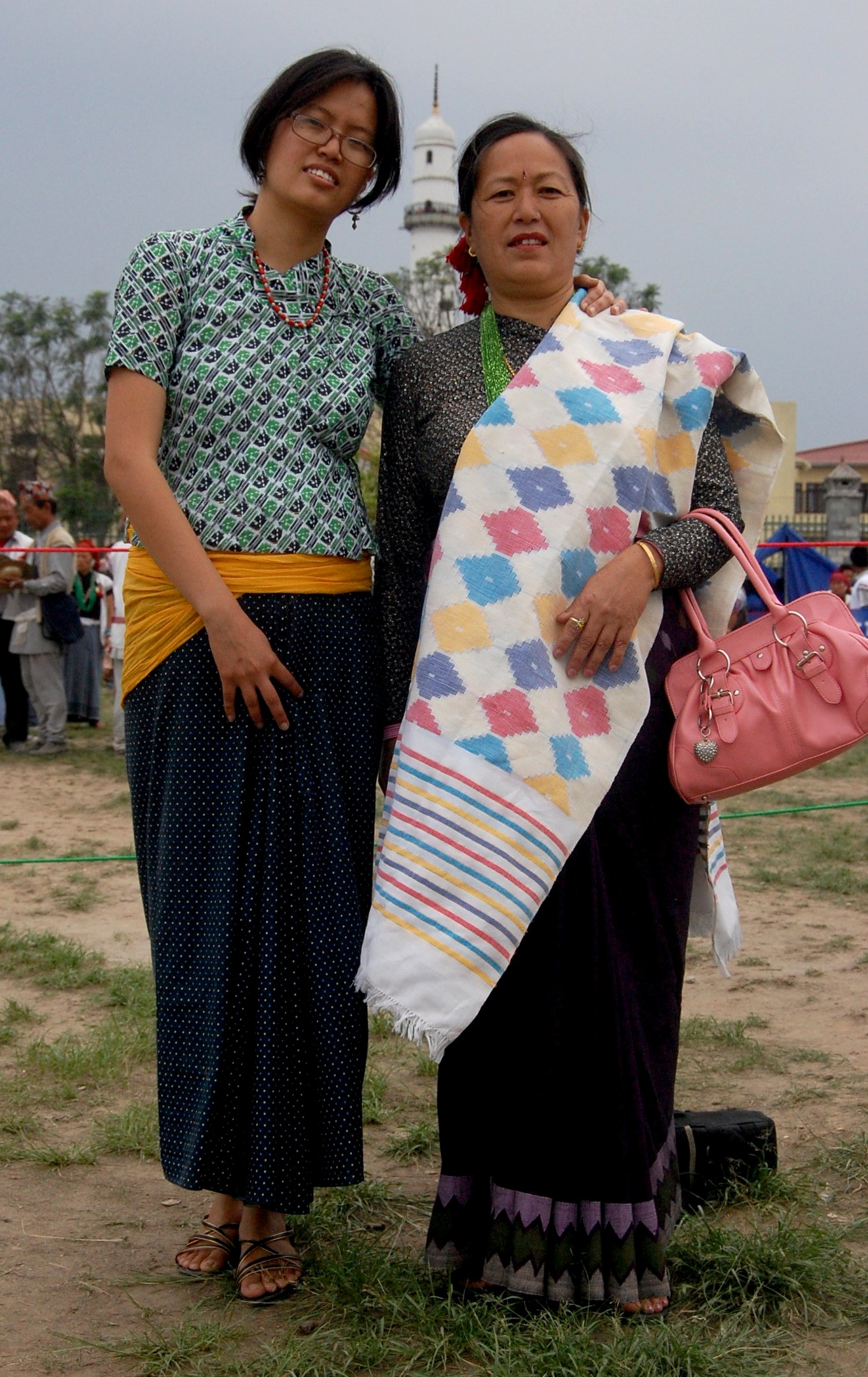
Lohorung women in traditional costume at Kathmandu, Nepal

Lohorung are a major subgroup of Kirati people and ethnic native people of eastern Nepal. The Lohorung homeland is Sankhuwasabha district in the northern part of the Arun watershed, a tributary to the Koshi. At present they are found in eight other districts of Nepal: Ilam, Jhapa, Sunsari, Morang, Dhankuta, Terhathum, Lalitpur and Kathmandu. They also live in northeastern states of India: Darjeeling, Kalimpong & Kumai in West Bengal, Sikkim and Assam, and even Bhutan, Australia, United Kingdom and United States.

The Lohorung language belongs to the Kiranti group of Sino-Tibetan languages. Lohorung Yakhkhaba Yuyong is a non-profit organization advocating for the Lohorung community. It is based in Kathmandu, Nepal.

The main festivals of Lohorung are Nwagi and Ikksammang.

== Lohorung language ==
| cham | food, rice |
| khen | curry |
| yaa:-mi | people |
| pap-paa | grandfather |
| Maa:ma | grandmother |
| Appa | Father |
| Aama | mother |
| nana | elder sister/Younger auntie to Dad |
| Nusa | little sister |
| Demaa | Aunt elder to dad |
| Deppa | Uncle Elder to Dad |
| Babbang | Uncle younger to Dad |
| Bubu | Elder Brother |
| Nusa | Younger Brother |
| Ikssaba | solti |
| Iksama | soltini |
| Yessa / Yessama | Brothers children Son/ Daughter |
| Koyeng/Deppa | Mother's Brother |
| chang-chera/ Che | cloths |
| yowaa | water |
| Mik | Eyes |
| mii | fire |
| khoray | bowl |
| khapmee | flour |
| Pangke | Millet |
| Thiee/Deebu | locally brew wine |
| saa | meat |
| Saruwa | Lohorung Wine |
| Hopthiwa | Alcohol |
| Yang | Money |

== The different branch of Lohorung people ==
1. Sibau
2. Tingguwa
3. Khaisong
4. Chang-kha me
5. Seppa
6. Dingguwa
7. Yangkhurung
8. Lamsong
9. Dekhim
10. Biwa
11. Biksik
12. Lumben
13. ketra
14. yumpang
15. Mikchereng
16. Chawa
17. Hanglengba
18. yungbary(yungkhaba)

== List of Lohorung villages ==
- Yaphudanda
- Khartuwa
- Pangma
- Heluwa
- Diding
- Dhupu
- Tallo Dhupu
- Malta
- Khandbari
- Malingtar
- Ilam
- Dhankuta
- Letang
- Angla
- Dharan
- Itahari
- Kathmandu
- Yaphu
- Tumlingtar
- Num
- Hedangna
- Dharampur, Jhapa
- Sikkim, Darjeeling, Kalimpong & Kumai of India
- Samtse, Chukha of Bhutan
- belbari

This essay is also found in the spoken version of '

== See also ==
- Other Worlds: Notions of Self and Emotion among the Lohorung Rai a non-fiction social sciences book by Charlotte Hardman about the Lohorung people
- Rai people Kirati Ethnolinguistic Group In Nepal & Indian State of Sikkim, Darjeeling, Kalimpong and Kumai Region of West Bengal.
