= Other Worlds (book) =

2000 book by Charlotte Hardman

Other Worlds: Notions of Self and Emotion among the Lohorung Rai
- Author: Charlotte Hardman
- Language: English
- Series: Explorations in Anthropology Series
- Subject: Social science
- Publisher: Berg Publishers
- Publication date: December 1, 2000
- Publication place: Nepal
- Pages: 320 pages
- ISBN: 9781859731550

Other Worlds: Notions of Self and Emotion among the Lohorung Rai is a 2000 non-fiction social sciences book by Charlotte Hardman. The book was published on December 1, 2000, through Berg Publishers and is about the rites and rituals the Lohorung people of Nepal use to connect with their dead ancestors.

Reception for Other Worlds was mostly positive. A reviewer for the Journal of the Royal Anthropological Institute praised the book as being "a valuable contribution to the ethnography of east Nepal". Gregory Maskarinec of Anthropos commented that Other Worlds "must have lacked a copy editor" due to the book's uneven feel and typographical errors.

== Table of contents ==
Chapter	Title	Page #
	List of Maps and Figures	
	A Note on Lohorung and Nepali Words	
	Glossary	
	Preface	
1	Theories in My Boots	1
2	Pangma People	19
3	The Ancestors Are Angry	41
4	The Superhuman World and Knowledge of Illness	59
5	Knowledge of the Past for the Present	103
6	Lohorung Houses: Saya and Nuagi	137
7	The Person and the Cycle of Life	173
8	Emotions and Concepts of Mind: Understanding Lohorung Behaviour and Social Institutions	223
9	Personhood, Emotions and Ethnopsychology Concluding Remarks	273
App. 1	The Lohorung Language	283
App. 2	Kinship Terminology	287
App. 3	Lohorung Texts	291
	Bibliography	297
	Index	307
