= Un autre monde =

Un autre monde, French for Another world, may refer to:

- Un autre monde (Daniel Balavoine album), 1980
- Un autre monde (Téléphone album), 1984
- Un autre monde (film), or Another World, a 2021 French film
- "Un autre monde", an 1895 short story by J.-H. Rosny aîné
- Un autre monde, an illustrated book by Jean Ignace Isidore Gérard Grandville
