= Christina's World =

1948 painting by Andrew Wyeth

- Artist: Andrew Wyeth
- Year: 1948
- Catalogue: 78455
- Medium: Egg tempera on gessoed panel
- Dimensions: 81.9 cm × 121.3 cm (32 1/4 in × 47 3/4 in)
- Location: Museum of Modern Art, New York
- Accession: 16.1949

Christina's World is a 1948 painting by American painter Andrew Wyeth and one of the best-known American paintings of the mid-20th century. It is a tempera work done in a realist style, depicting a woman in an inclined position on the ground in a treeless, mostly tawny field, looking up at a gray house on the horizon, a barn, and various other small outbuildings adjacent to the house. It is held by the Museum of Modern Art, in New York.

The painting was featured in the 1980 BBC Two series 100 Great Paintings.

== Background ==
The woman in the painting is Anna Christina Olson (May 3, 1893 – January 27, 1968). Anna had a degenerative muscular disorder, possibly polio or Charcot-Marie-Tooth disease, which left her unable to walk. She was firmly against using a wheelchair, so she would crawl everywhere. Wyeth was inspired to create the painting when he saw her crawling across a field while he was watching from a window in the house. He had a summer home in the area, and was on friendly terms with Olson, using her younger brother and her as the subjects of paintings from 1940 to 1968. Olson was the inspiration and subject of the painting, but she was not the primary model; Wyeth's wife Betsy posed as the torso of the painting. Olson was 55 at the time Wyeth created the work. The painting's title was suggested by Betsy Wyeth, and the artist described his aim as doing justice to Olson's "extraordinary conquest of a life which most people would consider hopeless."

The house depicted in the painting is known as the Olson House in Cushing, Maine. It is open to the public, and operated by the Farnsworth Art Museum. It is a National Historic Landmark and has been restored to match its appearance in the painting, although Wyeth separated the house from its barn and changed the lay of the land for the painting. Wyeth is buried in the nearby Olson family graveyard.

== Reception and history ==
Christina's World was first exhibited at the Macbeth Gallery in Manhattan in 1948. It received little attention from critics at the time, but Alfred Barr, the founding director of the Museum of Modern Art (MoMA), bought the painting for $1,800 (equivalent to about $25,000 in 2026 dollars). He promoted it at MoMA, and it gradually grew in popularity. Today, it is considered an icon of American art and is rarely lent out by the museum.

== Appearances in other media ==
Arthur C. Clarke made reference to Christina's World in his novel 2001: A Space Odyssey. In it, the character David Bowman notices the painting (along with van Gogh's Bridge at Arles) when observing the living room of "an elegant, anonymous hotel suite" after travelling through the Stargate. Neither painting appeared in the movie.
