= Cushing, Maine =

Town in Maine, United States

- Town
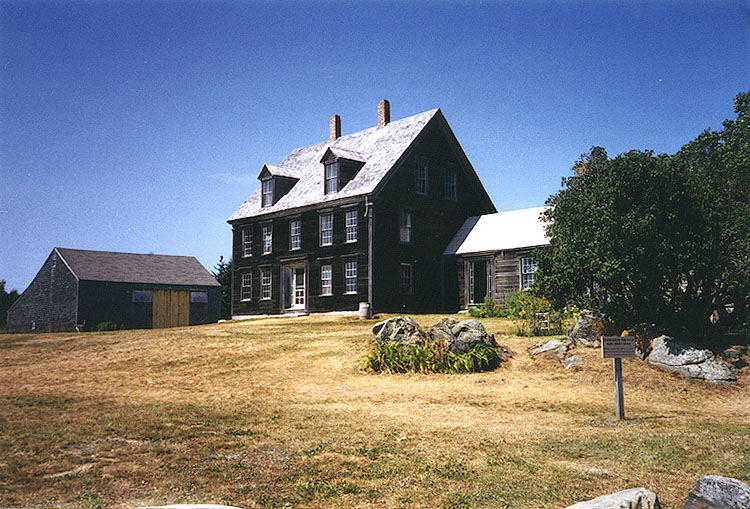
- Olson House, 1995

- Location in Knox County and the state of Maine
- Coordinates: 44°00′36″N 69°15′35″W
- Country: United States
- State: Maine
- County: Knox
- Incorporated: 1789
- Villages: Cushing; North Cushing; South Cushing

Area
  - Total: 26.05 sq mi (67.47 km^{2})
  - Land: 19.24 sq mi (49.83 km^{2})
  - Water: 6.81 sq mi (17.64 km^{2})
- Elevation: 89 ft (27 m)

Population (2020)
  - Total: 1,502
  - Density: 78/sq mi (30.1/km^{2})
- Time zone: UTC-5 (Eastern (EST))
  - Summer (DST): UTC-4 (EDT)
- ZIP code: 04563
- Area code: 207
- FIPS code: 23-15780
- GNIS feature ID: 582428
- Website: www.cushing.maine.gov

Cushing is a town in Knox County, Maine, United States. The population was 1,502 at the 2020 census. Cushing includes the villages of North Cushing, Cushing, South Cushing, and Pleasant Point.

== History ==
Part of the Waldo Patent, it was called the Lower Plantation of St. Georges, once extending across both sides of the St. George River. It was first permanently settled in 1733 with Scots and Irish immigrants recruited from Ireland by Brigadier-General Samuel Waldo, who offered 100 acres (0.40 km^{2}) for each household. Attacks during the French and Indian Wars, however, deterred habitation. A stone blockhouse known as Burton's Fort was built in 1753 by its commander, Captain Benjamin Burton. Hostilities finally ceased in 1759 with the Fall of Quebec. On January 28, 1789, the town was incorporated and named for Thomas Cushing, statesman and lieutenant governor of Massachusetts. On February 7, 1803, the town of St. George was set off and incorporated.

The Olson House was depicted in Andrew Wyeth's 1948 painting, Christina's World, which in turn was used as Dahlia Gillespie's house in the horror video game series Silent Hill, and inspired the farmer's house in the 1978 film Days of Heaven. The building is now operated by the Farnsworth Art Museum of Rockland.

== Geography ==
According to the United States Census Bureau, the town has a total area of 26.05 square miles (67.47 km^{2}), of which 19.24 square miles (49.83 km^{2}) is land and 6.81 square miles (17.64 km^{2}) is water. Cushing, which includes Gay Island, is situated on Muscongus Bay between the Meduncook River to the west and St. George River to the east.

The town is served by Maine State Route 97. It borders Friendship to the west, Warren and Thomaston to the north, and separated by the St. George River, South Thomaston and St. George to the east.

== Demographics ==
Historical population
| Census | Pop. | Note | %± |
|---|---|---|---|
| 1790 | 942 | | — |
| 1800 | 1,415 | | 50.2% |
| 1810 | 532 | | −62.4% |
| 1820 | 600 | | 12.8% |
| 1830 | 681 | | 13.5% |
| 1840 | 790 | | 16.0% |
| 1850 | 807 | | 2.2% |
| 1860 | 796 | | −1.4% |
| 1870 | 704 | | −11.6% |
| 1880 | 805 | | 14.3% |
| 1890 | 688 | | −14.5% |
| 1900 | 604 | | −12.2% |
| 1910 | 535 | | −11.4% |
| 1920 | 416 | | −22.2% |
| 1930 | 350 | | −15.9% |
| 1940 | 362 | | 3.4% |
| 1950 | 376 | | 3.9% |
| 1960 | 479 | | 27.4% |
| 1970 | 522 | | 9.0% |
| 1980 | 795 | | 52.3% |
| 1990 | 988 | | 24.3% |
| 2000 | 1,322 | | 33.8% |
| 2010 | 1,534 | | 16.0% |
| 2020 | 1,502 | | −2.1% |
U.S. Decennial Census

=== 2010 census ===
As of the census of 2010, there were 1,534 people, 642 households, and 431 families residing in the town. The population density was 79.7 inhabitants per square mile (30.8/km^{2}). There were 926 housing units at an average density of 48.1 per square mile (18.6/km^{2}). The racial makeup of the town was 98.8% White, 0.2% Native American, 0.1% Asian, 0.2% from other races, and 0.8% from two or more races. Hispanic or Latino of any race were 0.6% of the population.

There were 642 households, of which 29.8% had children under the age of 18 living with them, 53.1% were married couples living together, 7.8% had a female householder with no husband present, 6.2% had a male householder with no wife present, and 32.9% were non-families. 25.9% of all households were made up of individuals, and 9.8% had someone living alone who was 65 years of age or older. The average household size was 2.38 and the average family size was 2.83.

The median age in the town was 44 years. 22.9% of residents were under the age of 18; 6.4% were between the ages of 18 and 24; 22.3% were from 25 to 44; 30.9% were from 45 to 64; and 17.5% were 65 years of age or older. The gender makeup of the town was 49.2% male and 50.8% female.

=== 2000 census ===
As of the census of 2000, there were 1,322 people, 541 households, and 383 families residing in the town. The population density was 68.1 inhabitants per square mile (26.3/km^{2}). There were 778 housing units at an average density of 40.1 per square mile (15.5/km^{2}). The racial makeup of the town was 99.47% White, 0.08% Asian, 0.08% from other races, and 0.38% from two or more races. Hispanic or Latino of any race were 0.45% of the population. 28.3% were of English, 13.5% American, 9.1% Irish, 7.9% German, 5.9% Finnish, 5.2% French and 5.1% Scottish ancestry according to Census 2000.

There were 541 households, out of which 28.3% had children under the age of 18 living with them, 59.5% were married couples living together, 6.7% had a female householder with no husband present, and 29.2% were non-families. 23.7% of all households were made up of individuals, and 10.2% had someone living alone who was 65 years of age or older. The average household size was 2.42 and the average family size was 2.82.

In the town, the population was spread out, with 22.5% under the age of 18, 7.6% from 18 to 24, 27.2% from 25 to 44, 26.2% from 45 to 64, and 16.6% who were 65 years of age or older. The median age was 41 years. For every 100 females, there were 100.6 males. For every 100 females age 18 and over, there were 103.0 males.

The median income for a household in the town was $40,598, and the median income for a family was $43,929. Males had a median income of $28,553 versus $22,455 for females. The per capita income for the town was $20,264. About 7.6% of families and 12.8% of the population were below the poverty line, including 20.6% of those under age 18 and 5.9% of those age 65 or over.

== Education ==
Cushing is served by Regional School Unit 13

- Cushing Community School Grades K-5

== Notable people ==
- Raymond Cazallis Davis, librarian
- Peter Halley, artist
- Elisabeth Ogilvie, writer
- Edward Robinson, US congressman
- Andrew Wyeth, artist
