= Drybrush =

Painting technique

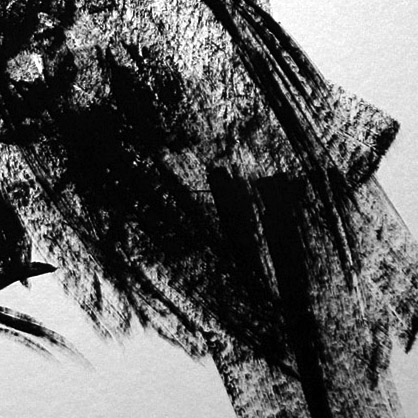
An example of the drybrush technique using black acrylic paint on illustration board

Drybrush is a painting technique in which a paint brush that is relatively dry, but still holds paint, is used to create a drawing or painting. Load is applied to a dry support such as paper or primed canvas. The resulting brush-strokes have a characteristic scratchy and textured look that lacks the smooth appearance that washes or blended paint commonly have. This technique can be used to achieve a blurred or soft appearance.

The technique of drybrush painting can be achieved with both water-based and oil-based media. With water-based media such as inks, acrylic paints, tempera-paints, or watercolor-paints, the brush is usually dry or squeezed dry of all water. The brush is loaded with paint that is highly viscous or thick and then applied to a dry support. With other water-based media, the brush is loaded with paint and then squeezed dry. When using oil-based media, such as oil-paint, similar techniques are used, although instead of water, the brush is used dry or any oil or solvent is removed. Because oil-paint has a longer drying-time than water-based media, brushing over or blending drybrush strokes is often avoided to preserve the distinctive look of the drybrush-painting-technique.

The technique is often used in model-painting to apply highlights to miniatures.

Oil-based drybrushing can also be scrubbed onto paper, canvas or absorbent gesso with stiff bristle brushes to impart smooth airbrushed or pastel-style effects. Next is that drybrush is sometimes mixed with other painting techniques

Coming from the dry brush technique, an autonomous painting technique developed in a comparatively short time:

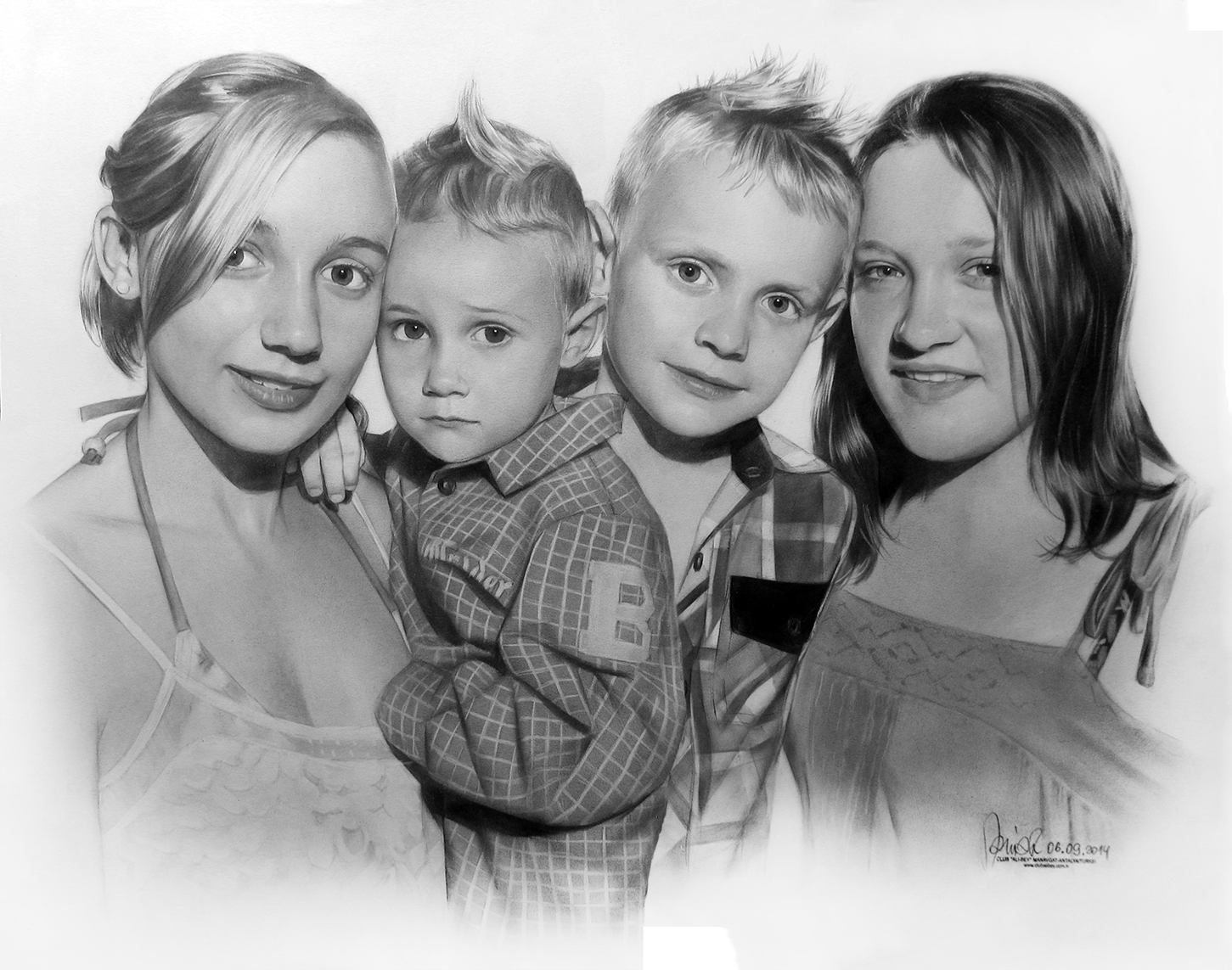
Portrait using drybrushing technique

For painting with the dry brush a small amount of oil is used. The color is diluted with a few drops of linseed oil or solvents. From this mixture very little color is added to the brush. In the next step the brush with the color on it is spread out very well on a color palette and the oil is secreted. The brush must be dry at the end of this step.

Linseed oil, when used with oil paint for dry brushing, will yellow if it becomes too warm, such as being left in a car in the summer sun. Sewing machine oil and diesel oil work just as well and do not yellow.

Now a very thin layer of color is applied to a watercolor paper. By reworking with an eraser at this point it is possible to incorporate different lighting effects and details.

Images painted with a dry brush are characterized by the specific transitions of light and shadow and gossamer tones. A work done in black and white appears similar to a coal or fine pencil drawing.

== Tutorials and technique ==
- Nadja Sasch: Der trockene Pinsel. Edition Michael Fischer, Ingling 2012, ISBN 978-3-86355-085-1.

== See also ==
- Art movement
- Creativity techniques
- List of art media
- List of artistic media
- List of art movements
- List of art techniques
