= List of museums in Pennsylvania =

This list of museums in Pennsylvania encompasses museums defined for this context as institutions (including nonprofit organizations, government entities, and private businesses) that collect and care for objects of cultural, artistic, scientific, or historical interest and make their collections or related exhibits available for public viewing. Also included are university and non-profit art galleries. Virtual museums that cannot be visited physically are not included.

== Current museums ==
Name	Town/City	County	Region	Type	Summary
1719 Hans Herr House & Museum	Willow Street	Lancaster	Pennsylvania Dutch Country	Open air	Mennonite history, colonial and Victorian era farm life
1852 Herr Family Homestead	Landisville	Lancaster	Pennsylvania Dutch Country	Historic house	website, depicts life on a 19th-century Lancaster County farm
AACA Museum	Hershey	Dauphin	Pennsylvania Dutch Country	Transportation - Automotive	website, also known as Antique Automobile Club of America Museum, vintage automobiles, buses, motorcycles and memorabilia
Abington Art Center	Jenkintown	Montgomery	Philadelphia metropolitan area	Art	Contemporary art museum and a sculpture park
Air Heritage Museum	Beaver Falls	Beaver	Pittsburgh Metro Area	Transportation - Aviation	website, restored aircraft
Albany Township Historical Society Museum	Trexler	Berks	Pennsylvania Dutch Country	Local history	website
Allegheny-Kiski Heritage Museum	Tarentum	Allegheny	Pittsburgh Metro Area	Local history	website, story of the home front during WWII, aluminum and glass collections from area companies
Allegheny Portage Railroad National Historic Site	Gallitzin	Cambria	Laurel Highlands/Southern Alleghenies	Transportation - Railroad	Park with engine house, historic tavern, mid 19th century Samuel Lemon House
Allentown Art Museum	Allentown	Lehigh	Lehigh Valley	Art	European and American paintings, textiles, prints and drawings
Allison-Antrim Museum	Greencastle	Franklin	Cumberland Valley	Local history	web
America On Wheels	Allentown	Lehigh	Lehigh Valley	Transportation - Automotive	
American Military Edged Weaponry Museum	Intercourse	Lancaster	Pennsylvania Dutch Country	Military	information, collection of US military knives used by the American servicemen, military artifacts
American Golf Hall of Fame	Foxburg	Clarion	Northwest Region	Sports	Historic golf clubs and artifacts
American Helicopter Museum & Education Center	West Chester	Chester	Delaware Valley	Transportation - Aviation	Over 35 civilian and military helicopters, autogiros and convertaplanes
American Treasure Tour	Oaks	Montgomery	Delaware Valley	Multiple	Expansive collection includes nickelodeons, band organs, classic cars, movie posters, Americana, circus art, dolls and dollhouses, open by reservation
Amish Experience	Bird-in-Hand	Lancaster	Pennsylvania Dutch Country	Historic house	website, depicts modern Amish life in an Amish homestead and one room school
Amish Farm and House	Lancaster	Lancaster	Pennsylvania Dutch Country	Farm	website, working farm, historical and modern customs of Lancaster County's Amish
Amy B. Yerkes Museum	Hatboro	Montgomery	Delaware Valley	Local history	website, operated by the Millbrook Society
Andalusia (Nicholas Biddle Estate)	Andalusia	Bucks	Philadelphia metropolitan area	Historic house	
Antique Ice Tool Museum	West Chester	Chester	Philadelphia metropolitan area	Industry	website, private museum showcasing ice trade tools, vehicles, iceboxes, and other historical objects
Antoine Dutot Museum & Gallery	Delaware Water Gap	Monroe	Northeastern Pennsylvania	Multiple	website, art gallery and museum of local history housed in an 1850 brick schoolhouse
Appalachian Trail Museum	Gardners	Cumberland	Pennsylvania Dutch Country	History	Development of the Appalachian Trail
Art Association of Harrisburg	Harrisburg	Dauphin	Cumberland Valley	Art	website, galleries located in the historic Governor Findlay Mansion
Asa Packer Mansion	Jim Thorpe	Carbon	Lehigh Valley	Historic house	19th-century Victorian period mansion
Atlas Cement Company Memorial Museum	Northampton	Northampton	Lehigh Valley	Industry	information, information
Aughinbaugh Gallery	Grantham	Cumberland	Pennsylvania Dutch Country	Art	website, part of Messiah College Department of Visual Arts
Bachmann Publick House	Easton	Northampton	Lehigh Valley	Historic house	Under renovation, 18th-century colonial inn and tavern
Bahr's Mill	Gabelsville	Berks	Pennsylvania Dutch Country	Mill	Late 19th-century woodworking and grist mill
Baker Mansion	Altoona	Blair	Laurel Highlands/Southern Alleghenies	Local history	Museum of the Blair County Historical Society
Baldwin-Reynolds House Museum	Meadville	Crawford	Northwest Region	Historic house	Owned by the Crawford County Historical Society, reflects three centuries of owners; Dr. J. R. Mosier Office on site
Barns-Brinton House	Chadds Ford	Delaware	Delaware Valley	Historic house	Operated by the Chadds Ford Historical Society, early-18th-century-period house
Barton Street School	Lock Haven	Clinton	Central PA	Local history	website, operated by the Clinton County Historical Society, includes memorabilia from local fire companies and military artifacts
Battles Museums of Rural Life	Girard	Erie	Northwest Region	Historic house	website, operated by the Erie County Historical Society; Museum site consists of two historic homes, the R.S. Battles Farmhouse and the Charlotte Elizabeth Battles Memorial Museum, on 50 acres (200,000 m^{2}) of farm land and 80 acres (320,000 m^{2}) of woods and hiking trails
Bayernhof Music Museum	O'Hara Township	Allegheny	Pittsburgh Metro Area	Music	Automated musical instruments from the 19th and 20th centuries
Beaver Area Heritage Museum	Beaver	Beaver	Pittsburgh Metro Area	Local history	website, operated by the Beaver Area Heritage Foundation
Beaver County Industrial Museum	Darlington	Beaver	Pittsburgh Metro Area	Industry - Steel	website, part of the Darlington Museum complex
Beaver Falls Historical Society Museum	Beaver Falls	Beaver	Pittsburgh Metro Area	Local history	Housed in the Carnegie Free Library
Bell School	Hamilton Township	Monroe	Northeastern Pennsylvania	School	website, operated by the Monroe County Historical Association; Stormsville is part of Hamilton Township
Bellefonte Art Museum	Bellefonte	Centre	Central PA	Art	website, local art in all media
Berks County Heritage Center	Reading	Berks	Pennsylvania Dutch Country	Open air	website, includes Gruber Wagon Works, the C. Howard Hiester Canal Center, Wertz's Covered Bridge, Melcher's Grist Mill, memorials and gardens, operated by the County
Berks History Center	Reading	Berks	Pennsylvania Dutch Country	Local history	Operated by the Historical Society of Berks County
Berman Museum of Art	Collegeville	Montgomery	Delaware Valley	Art	website, part of Ursinus College, houses over 4,000 paintings, prints, drawings, sculpture, decorative, and cultural objects
Bible History Exhibits	Ronks	Lancaster	Pennsylvania Dutch Country	Religious	website, operated by the Institute for Biblical and Scientific Studies, replica archaeological artifacts to illuminate the Bible
Bicycle Heaven	Pittsburgh	Allegheny	Pittsburgh Metro Area	Transportation	A free museum housing 30,000 vintage and movie bicycles including the one used in Pee-wee's Big Adventure.
Big Mac Museum Restaurant	North Huntingdon	Westmoreland	Pittsburgh Metro Area	Food	Tribute to the Big Mac and its creator
Bill's Old Bike Barn	Bloomsburg	Columbia	Central PA	Transportation - Automotive	website, motorcycles, also Americana memorabilia from nautical, circus, Harley Davidson and other collections
Blooming Grove Museum	Cogan Station	Lycoming	Central PA	Local history	Facebook site, operated by the Blooming Grove Historical Society
Boal Mansion Museum	Boalsburg	Centre	Central PA	Historic house	Reflects original furnishings and single family ownership over 200 years
Boalsburg Heritage Museum	Boalsburg	Centre	Central PA	Local history	website
Boyertown Area Historical Society	Boyertown	Berks	Pennsylvania Dutch Country	Local history	website
Boyertown Museum of Historic Vehicles	Boyertown	Berks	Pennsylvania Dutch Country	Transportation - Automotive	website, includes motorized, horse-drawn and man-powered road transportation from wagons and trucks to bicycles and cars
Braddock's Battlefield History Center	North Braddock	Allegheny	Pittsburgh Metro Area	Military	History of the Braddock Expedition and the French and Indian War
Bradford County Farm Museum and The Heritage Village	Troy	Bradford	Northern Tier	Agriculture	Facebook site, features rare farm implements, large and small farm machinery and tools, individual rooms showing a blacksmith shop, tin shop, winter workroom, general store, children's games, Grange, game commission artifacts, farm kitchen, model tractors, Revolutionary war items
Bradford County Museum	Towanda	Bradford	Northern Tier	Local history	Located in the Bradford County Jail
Brandywine Battlefield Park	Chadds Ford	Delaware	Delaware Valley	Open air	Site of the Battle of Brandywine fought on September 11, 1777, during the American Revolution, administered by the Pennsylvania Historical and Museum Commission
Brandywine River Museum	Chadds Ford	Delaware	Delaware Valley	Art	American art with primary emphasis on the art of the Brandywine region, American illustration and still life painting; three generations of N. C. Wyeth family art
Broad Top Area Coal Miners Museum	Robertsdale	Huntingdon	Central PA	Industry - Coal	Coal mining and railroad exhibits; Robertsdale is part of Wood Township
Brown's Mill School	Greencastle	Franklin	Cumberland Valley	Education	Operated by the Franklin County Historical Society, historic schoolhouse
Buhl House	Zelienople	Butler	Pittsburgh Metro Area	Historic house	website, operated by the Zelienople Historical Society
Burnside Plantation	Bethlehem	Northampton	Lehigh Valley	Open air	Property includes restored 1748/1818 farmhouse, two 1840s bank barns, a high horse-power wheel, large kitchen garden and orchard, a corn crib and wagon shed
Burtner House	Natrona Heights	Allegheny	Pittsburgh Metro Area	Historic house	Early-19th-century farmhouse
Bushy Run Battlefield	Penn Township	Westmoreland	Pittsburgh Metro Area	Open air	Administered by the Pennsylvania Historical and Museum Commission
Butler County Historical Society	Butler	Butler	Pittsburgh Metro Area	Local history	website, operates the 1828 Lowrie/Shaw House, the 1815 Cooper Cabin Pioneer Homestead, and the 1838 Little Red School House
Calder House Museum	Equinunk	Wayne	Northeastern Pennsylvania	Local history	website, operated by the Equinunk Historical Society
Caleb Pusey House	Upland	Delaware	Delaware Valley	Historic house	Operated by the Friends of the Caleb Pusey House, late-17th-century house
Cambria County Historical Society Library and Museum	Ebensburg	Cambria	Laurel Highlands/Southern Alleghenies	Local history	
Carbondale Historical Society and Museum	Carbondale	Lackawanna	Northeastern Pennsylvania	Local history	Located on the third floor of the historic Carbondale City Hall and Courthouse
Carpenter Log House	Plum	Allegheny	Pittsburgh Metro Area	Historic house	website, operated by the Allegheny Foothills Historical Society, located in Boyce Park
Castanea Railroad Station	Castanea	Clinton	Central PA	Transportation - Railroad	website, operated by the Clinton County Historical Society, includes railroad artifacts and model train layout
Catlin House	Scranton	Lackawanna	Northeastern Pennsylvania	Local history	website, operated by the Lackawanna Historical Society, 1912 mansion
Centre County Library & Historical Museum	Bellefonte	Centre	Central PA	Local history	Centre County documents, photographs, family memorabilia and other genealogical items
Centre Furnace Mansion	State College	Centre	Central PA	Historic house	Home of the Centre County Historical Society, restored and furnished mid-19th-century ironmaster's home
Central Pennsylvania African American Museum	Reading	Berks	Pennsylvania Dutch Country	African American	History of African Americans in Central Pennsylvania, located in a former AME church
Chadds Ford Historical Society	Chadds Ford	Delaware	Delaware Valley	Local history	website, local history exhibits in the Barn Visitor Center, also operates tours of the Barns-Brinton House and the Chad House
Chambersburg Heritage Center	Chambersburg	Franklin	Cumberland Valley	Local history	website
Chester County History Center	West Chester	Chester	Delaware Valley	Local history	
The Children's Museum	Bloomsburg	Columbia	Central PA	Children's	website
Christiana Underground Railroad Center at Historic Zercher's Hotel	Christiana	Lancaster	Pennsylvania Dutch Country	History	website, site of Resistance at Christiana that led to the first nationally covered challenge to the Fugitive Slave Law of 1850
Clarion University Art Galleries	Clarion	Clarion	Northwest Region	Art	website, University Art Gallery is located in the lower level of Carlson Library, Empty Set Gallery is a student run space housed in Marwick Boyd Fine Arts Building
Clearfield County Historical Society and Museum	Clearfield	Clearfield	Central PA	Local history	website
The Clemente Museum	Pittsburgh	Allegheny	Pittsburgh Metro Area	Sports	A museum dedicated to the memorabilia and legacy of late baseball player Roberto Clemente.
Clifton House	Fort Washington	Montgomery	Delaware Valley	Local history	Operated by the Historical Society of Fort Washington
Collen Brook Farm	Upper Darby Township	Delaware	Delaware Valley	Historic house	Operated by the Upper Darby Historical Society, 18th-century farmhouse
Colonial Pennsylvania Plantation	Media	Delaware	Delaware Valley	Living	Located at Ridley Creek State Park
Columns Museum	Milford	Pike	Northeastern Pennsylvania	Local history	website, operated by the Pike County Historical Society
Compass Inn Museum	Laughlintown	Westmoreland	Laurel Highlands/Southern Alleghenies	Historic house	Restored inn with costumed docents that tell the story of transportation and everyday life in the early 19th century
Conestoga Area Historical Society Museum	Conestoga	Lancaster	Pennsylvania Dutch Country	Local history	website, museum housed in a 19th-century tobacco barn
Conrad Weiser Homestead	Womelsdorf	Berks	Pennsylvania Dutch Country	Historic house	Colonial homestead of Conrad Weiser, a very important figure in the settlement of the colonial frontier; park around the home designed by Frederick Law Olmsted Jr.; administered by the Pennsylvania Historical and Museum Commission
Coolspring Power Museum	Coolspring	Jefferson	Central PA	Technology	website, over 250 historic internal combustion stationary gas engines
Cooper's Shed Museum	Mount Joy	Lancaster	Pennsylvania Dutch Country	Industry - Beer	Part of Bube's Brewery complex
Cornwall Iron Furnace	Cornwall	Lebanon	Pennsylvania Dutch Country	Industry - Iron	National Historic Landmark iron furnaces, support buildings and surrounding community, administered by the Pennsylvania Historical and Museum Commission
Corry Area Historical Museum	Corry	Erie	Northwest Region	Local history	website, artifacts from pioneer life to the first modern oil refinery up to present-day manufacturing
Crayola Experience	Easton	Northampton	Lehigh Valley	Children's	Interactive creative stations, history of the Crayola company and its art products
Cresco Station Museum	Cresco	Monroe	Northeastern Pennsylvania	Local history	website, operated by the Barrett Township Historical Society
Crossroads Heritage Museum	Hamburg	Berks	Pennsylvania Dutch Country	Transportation	website, includes horse-drawn coaches, sleighs, wagons, construction equipment, agricultural equipment, vintage quilts, 1840 original stage coach, and small items related to the 19th century
Cumberland County Historical Society Museum	Carlisle	Cumberland	Cumberland Valley	Local history	website, folk art, local pottery, Native American and local historic artifacts, fine art, furniture
Dale/Engle/Walker House	Lewisburg	Union	Pennsylvania Dutch Country	Historic house	website, operated by the Union County Historical Society
Daniel Boone Homestead	Birdsboro	Berks	Pennsylvania Dutch Country	Open air	Administered by the Pennsylvania Historical and Museum Commission
David Mead Log Cabin	Meadville	Crawford	Northwest Region	Historic house	information
David Bradford House	Washington	Washington	Pittsburgh Metro Area	Historic house	18th-century-period house, home of David Bradford, a leader of the Whiskey Rebellion
David Wills House	Gettysburg	Adams	Pennsylvania Dutch Country	History	website, 19th-century law office of David Wills where President Abraham Lincoln revised his Gettysburg Address, exhibits about the battle's effects on the town, operated by the Gettysburg Foundation
Da Vinci Science Center	Allentown	Lehigh	Lehigh Valley	Science	
DeBence Antique Music World	Franklin	Venango	Northwest Region	Music	Antique mechanical musical instruments, including music boxes, calliopes, player pianos, and automated brass bands that date from the mid-19th century to the 1940s
Delaware County Historical Society Museum	Chester	Delaware	Delaware Valley	Local history	website, also archives and library
Delaware County Institute of Science	Media	Delaware	Delaware Valley	Natural history	website, natural history museum and natural science library, includes mounted birds and animals, an herbarium of Delaware County plants, fossils, shells, corals, animal skulls, bird nests and eggs, butterflies, spiders, insects
Demuth Museum	Lancaster	Lancaster	Pennsylvania Dutch Country	Art	Museum of paintings by Charles Demuth
Depreciation Lands Museum	Allison Park	Allegheny	Pittsburgh Metro Area	Living	website, colonial village life
Donora Smog Museum	Donora	Washington	Pittsburgh Metro Area	History	History of the Donora Smog of 1948, an air inversion of smog containing fluoride that killed 20 people
Dorflinger Glass Museum	White Mills	Wayne	Northeastern Pennsylvania	Glass	Cut glass crystal made in White Mills from 1852 to 1921, located at the 600-acre Dorflinger-Suydam Wildlife Sanctuary
Doylestown Historical Society	Doylestown	Bucks	Delaware Valley	Local history	website
Drake Well Museum	Titusville	Venango	Northwest Region	Industry - Oil	Beginnings of the modern oil industry through videos, exhibits, operating oil field machinery, and historic buildings in a park setting, administered by the Pennsylvania Historical and Museum Commission
Driebe Freight Station Art Gallery	Stroudsburg	Monroe	Northeastern Pennsylvania	Art	website, operated by the Monroe County Historical Association
Duncan & Miller Glass Museum	Washington	Washington	Pittsburgh Metro Area	Glass	website, exhibits of glass and tools of George Duncan & Sons and Duncan & Miller Glass Companies 1874 to 1955, and operated by The National Duncan Glass Society
Eagles Mere Museum	Eagles Mere	Sullivan	Northern Tier	Local history	website, exhibits include the George Lewis Glassworks era 1804–1830, farming era 1830–1880, narrow gauge railroad 1892–1926, big hotels' era 1880-1960s
Earth and Mineral Sciences Museum and Art Gallery	University Park	Centre	Central PA	Natural history	website, part of Pennsylvania State University, rocks, minerals, fossils, mining and scientific equipment, archaeological artifacts, paintings and sculpture depicting mining and related industries
East Broad Top Railroad	Rockhill Furnace	Huntingdon	Central PA	Transportation - Railroad	National Historic heritage railroad
Eastern Museum of Motor Racing	York Springs	Adams	Pennsylvania Dutch Country	Transportation - Automotive	website, collection of vintage race cars and artifacts and research library
Eckley Miners' Village	Weatherly	Luzerne	Lehigh Valley	Industry - Mining	Anthracite coal mining patch town, operated by the Pennsylvania Historical and Museum Commission
Edinboro Area Historical Society	Edinboro	Erie	Northwest Region	Local history	website
Eisenhower National Historic Site	Gettysburg	Adams	Pennsylvania Dutch Country	Presidential home	Home for the Eisenhowers after they left the White House in 1961
Eldred World War II Museum	Eldred	McKean	Northern Tier	Military	Exhibits about World War II
Electric City Trolley Museum	Scranton	Lackawanna	Northeastern Pennsylvania	Transportation	
Elizabeth Township Historical Society Museum	Boston	Allegheny	Pittsburgh Metro Area	Local history	Facebook site
Endless Mountains War Memorial Museum	Sonestown	Sullivan	Northern Tier	Military	Facebook page, honors America's veterans from all wars
Ephrata Cloister	Ephrata	Lancaster	Pennsylvania Dutch Country	Religious	One of America's earliest religious communities, founded in 1732, administered by the Pennsylvania Historical and Museum Commission
Erie Art Museum	Erie	Erie	Northwest Region	Art	
Erie Maritime Museum	Erie	Erie	Northwest Region	Maritime	Homeport of the U.S. Brig Niagara, administered by the Pennsylvania Historical and Museum Commission
Evans-Mumbower Mill	Upper Gwynedd Township	Montgomery	Delaware Valley	Mill	Restored 19th-century grist mill, operated by the Wissahickon Valley Watershed Association
Everhart Museum	Scranton	Lackawanna	Northeastern Pennsylvania	Multiple	Art, natural history and ethnographic collections (Native American, Oceania, South American and Asian), ancient civilizations, local/regional history and decorative arts
expERIEnce Children's Museum	Erie	Erie	Northwest Region	Children's	website
Explore & More	Gettysburg	Adams	Pennsylvania Dutch Country	Children's	website
Fallingwater	Bear Run	Fayette	Pittsburgh Metro Area	Historic house	Designed by Frank Lloyd Wright
Federal School	Haverford	Delaware	Delaware Valley	Education	Operated by the Haverford Historical Society, one room schoolhouse
Finley House	Wayne	Montgomery	Delaware Valley	Local history	website, headquarters of the Radnor Historical Society, features period kitchen and bedroom, doll and clothing display, collection of wagons, sleighs, carriages
Firefighters Historical Museum	Erie	Erie	Northwest Region	Firefighting	website
F. Julius Lemoyne House	Washington	Washington	Pittsburgh Metro Area	Historic house	National Historic Landmark of the underground railroad, operated by the Washington County Historical Society
Flatiron Building Heritage Center	Brownsville	Fayette	Pittsburgh Metro Area	Local history	Also houses the Frank L. Melega Art Museum
Fleetwood Area Historical Society Museum	Fleetwood	Berks	Pennsylvania Dutch Country	Local history	website
Fonthill	Doylestown	Bucks	Delaware Valley	Historic house	Poured concrete mansion with many Arts & Crafts decorative tiles
Forest County History Center	Tionesta	Forest	Northwest Region	Local history	website
Fort Bedford Museum	Bedford	Bedford	Laurel Highlands/Southern Alleghenies	Military	French and Indian War era British military fortification
Fort Hunter Mansion	Harrisburg	Dauphin	Cumberland Valley	Historic house	19th-century-period house and 40 acre park
Fort LeBoeuf Historical Society Museum	Waterford	Erie	Northwest Region	Local history	Located on the upper floors of the Eagle Hotel, also operates tours of the Judson House
Fort Ligonier	Ligonier	Westmoreland	Laurel Highlands/Southern Alleghenies	Military	Museum and recreated mid-18th-century British fort from the French and Indian War
Fort Necessity National Battlefield	Uniontown	Fayette	Pittsburgh Metro Area	Fort	Commemorates the first military engagement of the French and Indian War, includes reconstructed fort, visitor center and Mount Washington Tavern
Fort Roberdeau	Altoona	Blair	Laurel Highlands/Southern Alleghenies	Open air	Reconstructed Revolutionary War stockade surrounding six log cabins, 1858 barn containing exhibits, education center, trails
Frank L. Melega Art Museum	Brownsville	Fayette	Pittsburgh Metro Area	Art	Coal country-related artworks of Frank L. Melega and changing exhibits of contemporary art
Freedman Gallery	Reading	Berks	Pennsylvania Dutch Country	Art	website, part of Albright College
French Azilum	Towanda	Bradford	Northern Tier	Historic site	Site of planned settlement along the Susquehanna River for refugees fleeing the French Revolution
Friends of the East Broad Top Museum	Robertsdale	Huntingdon	Central PA	Transportation - Railroad	History and culture of the East Broad Top Railroad; Robertsdale is part of Wood Township
Friendship Hill National Historic Site	Point Marion	Fayette	Pittsburgh Metro Area	Historic house	18th-century home of early American politician Albert Gallatin
Frost Entomological Museum	University Park	Centre	Central PA	Natural history	Part of Penn State, insects
Fulton County Historical Society Museum	McConnellsburg	Fulton	Central PA	Local history	Located in a restored late-18th-century tavern
Gallery at Penn College	Williamsport	Lycoming	Central PA	Art	website, part of Pennsylvania College of Technology, located in Madigan Library
Gallitzin Tunnels Park & Museum	Gallitzin	Cambria	Laurel Highlands/Southern Alleghenies	Local history	Focuses on community's railroad, industrial, social, and religious heritage, park exhibits a restored 1942 Pennsylvania Railroad N5C Caboose, history of the Gallitzin Tunnel
Gen. Frederick Von Steuben Headquarters	Valley Forge	Chester	Delaware Valley	Historic house	
General Lee's Headquarters Museum	Gettysburg	Adams	Pennsylvania Dutch Country	Military	website, 1834 house used by General Robert E. Lee as his personal headquarters
George Taylor House	Catasauqua	Lehigh	Lehigh Valley	Historic house	Home of George Taylor, a signer of the Declaration of Independence, operated by the Lehigh Valley Historical Society
Gettysburg Beyond the Battle Museum	Gettysburg	Adams	Pennsylvania Dutch Country	Local history	website, operated by the Adams County Historical Society
Gettysburg National Military Park	Gettysburg	Adams	Pennsylvania Dutch Country	Civil War	Includes the Gettysburg Museum and Visitor Center, Gettysburg Cyclorama, 6,000 acres (24.3 km^{2}) of park lands, 30 miles (50 km) of roads, and over 1,400 monuments and markers
Gettysburg Railroad Station	Gettysburg	Adams	Pennsylvania Dutch Country	Transportation - Railroad	Railroad station with exhibits about President Lincoln's Gettysburg Address
Glencairn Museum	Bryn Athyn	Montgomery	Delaware Valley	Religious	Religious art and history from many religions
Golden Age Air Museum	Bethel	Berks	Pennsylvania Dutch Country	Transportation - Aviation	website, birth of the barnstormer, airmail, flying circuses and the first airlines, also automobiles
Goschenhoppen Folklife Museum	Green Lane	Montgomery	Delaware Valley	Ethnic	website, operated by the Goschenhoppen Historians, building also houses the Country Store Museum
Graeme Park	Horsham	Montgomery	Delaware Valley	Historic house	Only surviving residence of a colonial-era Pennsylvania governor, administered by the Pennsylvania Historical and Museum Commission
Grange Estate	Havertown	Delaware	Delaware Valley	Historic house	Operated by Friends of the Grange, mid-19th-century mansion
Greater Hazleton Historical Society Museum	Hazleton	Luzerne	Northeastern Pennsylvania	Local history	Facebook site, includes old-fashioned kitchen and school room displays
Greene County Historical Society Museum	Waynesburg	Greene	Pittsburgh Metro Area	Local history	Period rooms, exhibits of local businesses and industries, Monongahela culture
Greenville Area Historical Society Museum	Greenville	Mercer	Northwest Region	Local history	website
Greersburg Academy	Darlington	Beaver	Pittsburgh Metro Area	Local history	Also includes Native American artifacts
Grey Towers National Historic Site	Dingman Township	Pike	Northeastern Pennsylvania	Historic house	Ancestral home of Gifford Pinchot, first director of the United States Forest Service and twice elected governor of Pennsylvania
Grove City Area Historical Society Museum	Grove City	Mercer	Northwest Region	Local history	website
Gutelius House Museum	Mifflinburg	Union	Pennsylvania Dutch Country	Historic house	website, operated by the Union County Historical Society
Haas Gallery of Art	Bloomsburg	Columbia	Central PA	Art	website, part of Bloomsburg University
Hagen History Center	Erie	Erie	Northwest Region	Local history	Operated by the Erie County Historical Society; two-building complex contains the Watson-Curtze Mansion and Cashier's House, an 1839 Greek Revival style townhouse museum with 19th-century furnishings and changing period exhibits
Haines Mill	Cetronia	Lehigh	Lehigh Valley	Mill	Operated by the Lehigh County Historical Society, working grist mill
Haines Shoe House	Hallam	York	Pennsylvania Dutch Country	Historic house	Shoe-shaped house
Hands-on House	Lancaster	Lancaster	Pennsylvania Dutch Country	Children's	website, also known as Children's Museum of Lancaster
Hanna's Town	Greensburg	Westmoreland	Laurel Highlands/Southern Alleghenies	Open air	Reconstructed Hanna Tavern/Courthouse and three vintage late-18th-century log houses, a reconstructed Revolutionary era fort and blockhouse and wagon shed, administered by the Westmoreland County Historical Society
Hanover Area Historical Society Museum	Hanover	York	Pennsylvania Dutch Country	Local history	Located in the 18th-century Neas House, also tours of the Warehime-Myers Mansion
Hanover Fire Museum	Hanover	York	Pennsylvania Dutch Country	Firefighting	website, collection of fire memorabilia and apparatus
Hanover Junction Museum	Hanover	York	Pennsylvania Dutch Country	Transportation - Railroad	
Harmony Museum	Harmony	Butler	Pittsburgh Metro Area	Religious	Site of the first settlement established by the Harmony Society, a Christian theosophy and pietist society from 1805 to 1905
Harris Switch Tower	Harrisburg	Dauphin	South Central	Transportation - Railroad	Former Pennsylvania Railroad interlocking tower
Harriton House	Bryn Mawr	Montgomery	Delaware Valley	Historic house	18th-century house
Hartwood Mansion	Hampton Township	Allegheny	Pittsburgh Metro Area	Historic house	1929 Tudor mansion with antiques, public gardens, cottage, stable complex, and a gate lodge (erected in 1927)
Heisey House Museum	Lock Haven	Clinton	Central PA	Historic house	Operated by the Clinton County Historical Society, 19th-century Victorian house
Helfrich's Springs Grist Mill	Whitehall	Lehigh	Lehigh Valley	Mill	Operated by the Whitehall Historical Preservation Society, early 19th century grist mill
Henry Antes House	Upper Frederick Township	Montgomery	Delaware Valley	Historic house	Operated by the Goschenhoppen Historians, 18th-century Moravian settlement houses
Herbig Bakery	Bradford	McKean	Northern Tier	Local history	website, headquarters of the Bradford Landmark Society
Heritage Discovery Center	Johnstown	Cambria	Laurel Highlands/Southern Alleghenies	Local history	Immigrant experiences, also known as the Frank & Sylvia Pasquerilla Heritage Discovery Center
Hershey-Derry Township Historical Society Museum	Hershey	Dauphin	Pennsylvania Dutch Country	Local history	website, located in the barn at the old Milton Hershey School home and farm
Hershey Story	Hershey	Dauphin	Pennsylvania Dutch Country	Food	History and legacy of Milton S. Hershey and the chocolate candy confections he invented
Hershey's Chocolate World	Hershey	Dauphin	Pennsylvania Dutch Country	Food	Chocolate making
The Highlands	Fort Washington	Montgomery	Delaware Valley	Historic house	44-acre (180,000 m^{2}) site with a late-18th-century Georgian mansion and formal gardens
Historic Fallsington	Fallsington	Bucks	Delaware Valley	Open air	Tours of the village and interiors of Moon-Williamson Log House, Burges-Lippincott House and Stagecoach Tavern
Historic Langhorne Association	Langhorne	Bucks	Delaware Valley	Local history	
Historic Schaefferstown	Schaefferstown	Lebanon	Pennsylvania Dutch Country	Historic house	website, includes the Gemberling Rex House, Alexander Schaeffer Farm and the Brendle Museum with displays of folklore Pennsylvania German culture
Historic Wrightsville Museum	Wrightsville	York	Pennsylvania Dutch Country	Local history	website
Historic Yellow Springs	Chester Springs	Chester	Delaware Valley	Open air	website, thirteen structures, 142 acres (0.57 km^{2}), and a collection of art, artifacts, and archives
Historical Society of Berks County Museum	Reading	Berks	Pennsylvania Dutch Country	Local history	
Home Textile Tool Museum	Orwell	Bradford	Northern Tier	Textile	website, spinning wheels, looms and tools of early America
Honesdale Fire Museum	Honesdale	Wayne	Northeastern Pennsylvania	Firefighting	website
Hope Horn Gallery	Scranton	Lackawanna	Northeastern Pennsylvania	Art	website, part of the University of Scranton
Hope Lodge	Fort Washington	Montgomery	Delaware Valley	Historic house	18th-century mansion
Hopewell Furnace National Historic Site	Elverson	Berks	Pennsylvania Dutch Country	Industry - Iron	Living history presentations in the summer
Hornby School Museum	North East	Erie	Northwest Region	Education	Turn-of-the-20th-century-period schoolhouse
Horseshoe Curve	Altoona	Blair	Laurel Highlands/Southern Alleghenies	Transportation - Railroad	Visitor center with displays and views of the railroad horseshoe curve
Houdini Museum	Scranton	Lackawanna	Northeastern Pennsylvania	Biographical	Historic house with exhibits about Harry Houdini, also offers magic shows
Hoyt Center for the Arts	New Castle	Lawrence	Pittsburgh Metro Area	Art	website, regional arts center and museum
HUB-Roberson Galleries	University Park	Centre	Central PA	Art	website, part of Pennsylvania State University, located in the HUB-Robeson Center
Hummelstown Area Historical Society Museum	Hummelstown	Dauphin	Pennsylvania Dutch Country	Local history	website, also known as the Parish House building, contains collection of general artifacts of the Hummelstown area from the 18th century and an extensive arrowhead collection
Hunter House Museum	Sunbury	Northumberland	Central PA	Military	Headquarters of the Northumberland County Historical Society, includes historical and archaeological artifacts dealing with Fort Augusta
Hurry Hill Farm Maple Museum	Edinboro	Erie	Northwest Region	Agriculture	website, process for collecting and making maple syrup
Indenhofen Farm	Skippack	Montgomery	Delaware Valley	Historic house	Operated by the Skippack Historical Society in Evansburg State Park, 18th-century house
Indian Steps Museum	Airville	York	Pennsylvania Dutch Country	Native American	Large collection of Susquehannock Indian artifacts, WPA models and dioramas, Holtwood Dam and other local history exhibits
Isett Acres Museum	Huntingdon	Huntingdon	Central PA	American History	website, antiques and collectibles, tools, glassware, kitchen, laundry, schoolroom, toys, firearms
James A. Michener Art Museum	Doylestown	Bucks	Delaware Valley	Art	Art and cultural heritage of the Bucks County region
James A. Michener Art Museum	New Hope	Bucks	Delaware Valley	Art	Satellite facility, art and cultural heritage of the Bucks County region
Jefferson County History Center	Brookville	Jefferson	Central PA	Local history	website, operated by the Jefferson County Historical Society
Jennie Wade House	Gettysburg	Adams	Pennsylvania Dutch Country	Historic house	website, home of Jennie Wade, the only Gettysburg citizen killed during the Battle of Gettysburg
Jerry's Classic Cars and Collectibles Museum	Pottsville	Schuylkill	Pennsylvania Dutch Country	Transportation - Automotive	website
The Jimmy Stewart Museum	Indiana	Indiana	Pittsburgh Metro Area	Biographical	Memorabilia about actor James Stewart
Joanna Furnace Complex	Robeson Township	Berks	Pennsylvania Dutch Country	Industry - Iron	19th-century charcoal iron furnace, life in the iron-making community
John A. Hermann Jr. Memorial Art Museum	Bellevue	Allegheny	Pittsburgh Metro Area	Art	website, works by area artists
John Brown House (Chambersburg, Pennsylvania)	Chambersburg	Franklin	Cumberland Valley	Historic house	Operated by the Franklin County Historical Society - Kittochtinny, boarding house where abolitionist John Brown stayed
John Brown Farm, Tannery & Museum	Richmond Township	Crawford	Northwest Region	History	Farm, tannery ruins and archaeological site, built by abolitionist John Brown in 1825
John Chads House	Chadds Ford	Delaware	Delaware Valley	Historic house	Operated by the Chadds Ford Historical Society, early-18th-century-period house
John Harris-Simon Cameron Mansion	Harrisburg	Dauphin	Cumberland Valley	Historic house	Home of John Harris Jr., operated by the Historical Society of Dauphin County, 19th-century mansion
John Joseph Henry House	Nazareth	Northampton	Lehigh Valley	Historic house	website, 1832 house, operated by the Jacobsburg Historical Society
John McFadden Model Railroad Museum	Mercersburg	Franklin	Cumberland Valley	Transportation - Railroad	website
John Sebastian Goundie House	Bethlehem	Lehigh	Lehigh Valley	Historic house	website, part of Historic Bethlehem Museums & Sites, 1810 brick residence with temporary exhibits of local history
Johannes Mueller House	Lititz	Lancaster	Pennsylvania Dutch Country	Historic house	website, operated by the Lititz Historical Foundation, 1792 house with costumed docents
Johnson-Shaw Stereoscopic Museum	Meadville	Crawford	Northwest Region	Photography	website, repository for Keystone View Company stereoscopic products, documents and memorabilia
Johnstown Children's Museum	Johnstown	Cambria	Laurel Highlands/Southern Alleghenies	Children's	Located in the Heritage Discovery Center, interactive displays about Johnstown's geography, history, culture and industry
Johnstown Flood Museum	Johnstown	Cambria	Laurel Highlands/Southern Alleghenies	History	History of the 1889 Johnstown Flood
Johnstown Flood National Memorial	South Fork	Cambria	Laurel Highlands/Southern Alleghenies	History	Commemorates the approximately 2,200 people who died in the Johnstown Flood of 1889
Joseph Priestley House	Northumberland	Northumberland	Central PA	Historic house	Administered by the Pennsylvania Historical and Museum Commission, 18th & early 19th-century home of Joseph Priestley
Juniata College Museum of Art	Huntingdon	Huntingdon	Central PA	Art	website, collection includes Hudson River School, American portrait miniatures, Old Master paintings and prints
Kemerer Museum of Decorative Arts	Bethlehem	Lehigh	Lehigh Valley	Decorative arts	website, part of Historic Bethlehem Museums & Sites, includes Bohemian glass, fine needlework, tall case clocks, dolls, cast-iron toys and landscape paintings
Kentuck Knob	Stewart Township	Fayette	Pittsburgh Metro Area	Historic house	Designed by Frank Lloyd Wright
Kerr Memorial Museum	Oakmont	Allegheny	Pittsburgh Metro Area	Historic house	Depicts upper middle class life between 1890 and 1910
Kutztown Area Historical Society Museum	Kutztown	Berks	Pennsylvania Dutch Country	Local history	Located in a late 19th-century school building
Lacawac	Paupack Township	Wayne	Northeastern Pennsylvania	Historic house	Tours of the former estate house, 545-acre nature preserve, trails, public programs
Lackawanna Coal Mine Tour	Scranton	Lackawanna	Northeastern Pennsylvania	Industry - Coal	Adjacent to Pennsylvania Anthracite Heritage Museum
Lake Shore Railway Museum	North East	Erie	Northwest Region	Transportation - Railroad	website, operated by the Lake Shore Railway Historical Society; depots, locomotives, passenger cars
Lancaster County Historical Society	Lancaster	Lancaster	Pennsylvania Dutch Country	Local history	website, located at the Louise Arnold Tanger Arboretum
Lancaster Marionette Theatre	Lancaster	Lancaster	Pennsylvania Dutch Country	Puppet	website, includes museum with puppets from around the world and exhibits about John Durang
Lancaster Mennonite Historical Society Museum	Lancaster	Lancaster	Pennsylvania Dutch Country	Religious	website, exhibits about Mennonite and Amish life
Lancaster Museum of Art	Lancaster	Lancaster	Pennsylvania Dutch Country	Art	website
Lancaster Science Factory	Lancaster	Lancaster	Pennsylvania Dutch Country	Science	website
Landis Valley Museum	Lancaster	Lancaster	Pennsylvania Dutch Country	Living history	Administered by the Pennsylvania Historical and Museum Commission, Pennsylvania German material, culture, history and heritage from 1740 through 1940
Lawrence Cabin	Havertown	Delaware	Delaware Valley	Historic house	Operated by the Haverford Township Historical Society, early-18th-century log cabin
Lawrence County Historical Society Museum	New Castle	Lawrence	Pittsburgh Metro Area	Local history	website
Leechburg Area Museum and Historical Society	Leechburg	Armstrong	Pittsburgh Metro Area	Local history	website
Leesport Lock House	Leesport	Berks	Pennsylvania Dutch Country	Transportation	19th-century lock house, open for events
Lehigh University Art Galleries	Bethlehem	Northampton	Lehigh Valley	Art	website, includes two art galleries at the Zoellner Arts Center, several other galleries and outdoor sculptures around the campus
Lehigh County Heritage Museum	Allentown	Lehigh	Lehigh Valley	Local history	Operated by the Lehigh County Historical Society, Lehigh County history from the earliest Native American inhabitants to the German settlers of the 18th century through the Industrial Revolution to mercantile and wartime accounts from the 20th century
Lemon House	Cresson	Cambria	Laurel Highlands/Southern Alleghenies	Historic house	Part of the Allegheny Portage Railroad National Historic Site, restored 1840s period house and tavern
LeRoy Heritage Museum	Canton	Bradford	Northern Tier	Local history	website
Liberty Bell Museum	Allentown	Lehigh	Lehigh Valley	History	Exhibits relating to the Liberty Bell, liberty, freedom, patriotism and local history
Lincoln Highway Experience	Latrobe	Westmoreland	Laurel Highlands/Southern Alleghenies	Transportation	website, operated by the Lincoln Highway Heritage Corridor, telling story of our nation's first coast-to-coast highway, the Lincoln Highway
Lincoln Train Museum	Gettysburg	Adams	Pennsylvania Dutch Country	Transportation - Railroad	website, model trains and dioramas illustrating the railroad's role during the Civil War
Lititz Museum	Lititz	Lancaster	Pennsylvania Dutch Country	Local history	website, operated by the Lititz Historical Foundation
Little Buffalo State Park	Newport	Perry	Central PA	Historic house	Includes the Blue Ball Tavern Museum and Shoaff's Mill
Little Beaver Museum	Darlington	Beaver	Pittsburgh Metro Area	Local history	Facebook site, operated by the Little Beaver Historical Society
Little Museum	Sterling Run	Cameron	Central PA	Local history	website, operated by the Cameron County Historical Society
Livingood Museum	Womelsdorf	Berks	Pennsylvania Dutch Country	Local history	website, operated by the Tulpehocken Settlement Historical Society
Lock Ridge Furnace Museum	Alburtis	Lehigh	Lehigh Valley	Industry	Operated by the Lehigh County Historical Society, ruins of coal-burning iron furnace with displays about the anthracite iron industry
Lore Degenstein Gallery	Selinsgrove	Snyder	Central PA	Art	website, part of Susquehanna University
Lower Saucon Township Historical Society	Lower Saucon Township	Northampton	Lehigh Valley	Education	Former one-room school
Luzerne County Museum	Wilkes-Barre	Luzerne	Northeastern Pennsylvania	Local history	Operated by the Luzerne County Historical Society
Mack Trucks Museum	Allentown	Lehigh	Lehigh Valley	Transportation - Automotive	website, about Mack Trucks
Macungie Institute	Macungie	Lehigh	Lehigh Valley	Local history	website, community center with headquarters and the Lehigh Valley Heritage Museum of the Macungie Historical Society
Manheim Heritage Center	Manheim	Lancaster	Pennsylvania Dutch Country	Local history	website, operated by the Manheim Historical Society
Margaret R. Grundy Memorial Museum	Bristol	Bucks	Delaware Valley	Historic house	website, late Victorian mansion
Martin Guitar Museum	Nazareth	Northampton	Lehigh Valley	Music	Museum of the Martin Guitar Factory, factory tours
Marywood University Art Galleries	Scranton	Lackawanna	Northeastern Pennsylvania	Art	website
Mascaro-Steiniger Turfgrass Museum	University Park	Centre	Central PA	Technology	website, part of Penn State, open by appointment, lawn care equipment, located at the Landscape Management Research Center
Matson Museum of Anthropology	University Park	Centre	Central PA	Anthropology	website, part of Pennsylvania State University, displays archaeological objects from around the world, including Mesopotamia, Mexico and Pennsylvania, and items used by contemporary cultures from Latin America to Afghanistan
Mauch Chunk Museum	Jim Thorpe	Carbon	Lehigh Valley	Local history	website
McCarl Industrial & Agricultural Museum of Beaver County	Darlington	Beaver	Pittsburgh Metro Area	Industry	Operated by the Little Beaver Historical Society, history and development of manufacturing in the County
McCoy House Museum	Lewistown	Mifflin	Central PA	Local history	Operated by the Mifflin County Historical Society
McKeesport Regional History & Heritage Center	McKeesport	Allegheny	Pittsburgh Metro Area	Local history	
McMurtrie House Museum	Huntingdon	Huntingdon	Central PA	Historic house	website, operated by the Huntingdon County Historical Society
Meadowcroft Rockshelter and Museum of Rural Life	Avella	Washington	Pittsburgh Metro Area	Archaeological site, open air	Operated by the Heinz History Center, Woodland, Archaic and Paleoindian remains, 16,000-year-old campsite alongside a village recreating rural life from the 19th century
Mechanicsburg Museum	Mechanicsburg	Cumberland	Cumberland Valley	Open air	Includes Passenger Station and Stationmaster's House, Frankeberger Tavern, Freight Station, and the Washington Street Station
Mennonite Heritage Center	Harleysville	Montgomery	Delaware Valley	Religious	Local Mennonite history and traditions
Mennonite Information Center	Lancaster	Lancaster	Pennsylvania Dutch Country	Religious	website, movie about the Amish, features full-sized Biblical Tabernacle reproduction in wax
Mercer County Historical Society Museum	Mercer	Mercer	Northwest Region	Local history	website, located in the Anderson House, can also tour the Magoffin House with a guide
Mercer Museum	Doylestown	Bucks	Delaware Valley	History	Collection of early American objects and artifacts
Merrick Art Gallery	New Brighton	Beaver	Pittsburgh Metro Area	Art	Officially known as Merrick Free Art Gallery, Museum and Library, collection of French, German, English, and American paintings from the 18th and 19th century, including a collection of Hudson River School paintings
Mid-Atlantic Air Museum	Reading	Berks	Pennsylvania Dutch Country	Transportation - Aviation	Historic war planes, classic airliners, rare civilian and military aircraft
Mifflinburg Buggy Museum	Mifflinburg	Union	Pennsylvania Dutch Country	Transportation	Original carriage workshop with carriages, wagons, and sleighs and tools to make them
Millersburg Museum	Millersburg	Dauphin	Pennsylvania Dutch Country	Local history	Facebook site, operated by the Historical Society of Millersburg & Upper Paxton Township
Mill at Anselma	Chester Springs	Chester	Delaware Valley	Mill	18th-century grain mill
Mill Grove	Audubon	Montgomery	Delaware Valley	Historic house	Home of John James Audubon, art museum and Audubon wildlife sanctuary
Minshall House	Media	Delaware	Delaware Valley	Historic house	website
Misericordia University Art Galleries	Dallas	Luzerne	Lehigh Valley	Art	Pauly Friedman Art Gallery and MacDonald Art Gallery in Insalaco Hall
Mixsell House Museum	Easton	Northampton	Lehigh Valley	Historic house	Operated by the Northampton County Historical & Genealogical Society, open by appointment
Moland House	Hartsville	Bucks	Delaware Valley	Historic house	Operated by the Warwick Township Historical Society, 18th-century farmhouse used by George Washington as a headquarters in 1777
Montgomery House Museum	Danville	Montour	Northeastern Pennsylvania	Local history	Operated by the Montour County Historical Society
Moravian Museum	Bethlehem	Lehigh	Lehigh Valley	Open air	Tells the stories of the Moravian founders, includes 1741 Gemeinhaus, a five-story log structure, the 1752 Apothecary and the 1758 Nain-Schober House, part of Historic Bethlehem Museums & Sites
Moravian Historical Society Museum	Nazareth	Northampton	Lehigh Valley	Religious	History of the Moravian Church and its contributions to American history and culture
Moravian Pottery and Tile Works	Doylestown	Bucks	Delaware Valley	Industry	"Working history" museum
Morgan Log House	Lansdale	Montgomery	Delaware Valley	Historic house	Eartly 18th-century log house, operated by the Welsh Valley Preservation Society
Morton Morton House	Norwood	Delaware	Delaware Valley	Historic house	Operated by the Norwood Historical Society, 18th-century house
Mount Joy Historical Society Museum	Mount Joy	Lancaster	Pennsylvania Dutch Country	Local history	website
Muncy Historical Society and Museum of History	Muncy	Lycoming	Central PA	Local history	website, collection includes frakturs, a WPA-commissioned replica of Fort Muncy and military gallery, Native American artifacts, art, textiles
Munnell Run Farm	Mercer	Mercer	Northwest Region	Multiple	website, 163-acre working farm, environmental education and local history programs, interactions of agriculture and ecology, mid-19th century Bigler House
Museum of Indian Culture	Allentown	Lehigh	Lehigh Valley	Native American	Highlights the early history and culture of the Lenape and other American Indian tribes.
The Museum of Mourning Art	Drexel Hill	Delaware	Delaware Valley	History	Beliefs and rituals that surround the arts of dying and grieving
Nain-Schober House	Bethlehem	Lehigh	Lehigh Valley	Historic house	website, 18th-century house, part of Historic Bethlehem Museums & Sites
National Canal Museum	Easton	Northampton	Lehigh Valley	Transportation	History, science, and technology of canal construction and navigation, includes Emrick Technology Center with exhibits about the area's industrial history
National Centre for Padro Pio	Barto	Berks	Delaware Valley	Religious	website, promotes life and teachings of Saint Pio of Pietrelcina
National Civil War Museum	Harrisburg	Dauphin	Cumberland Valley	Civil War	
National Museum of the American Coverlet	Bedford	Bedford	Laurel Highlands/Southern Alleghenies	Textile	website, woven coverlets
National Museum of Industrial History	Bethlehem	Lehigh	Lehigh Valley	Textile, Steel and Iron, Propane Gas	website, housed in former Bethlehem Steel building, aims to preserve, educate, and display the industrial history of the nation
National Toy Train Museum	Strasburg	Lancaster	Pennsylvania Dutch Country	Transportation - Railroad	Operated by the Train Collectors Association, interactive display of toy trains dating back to the early 1800s
National Watch and Clock Museum	Columbia	Lancaster	Pennsylvania Dutch Country	Horology	
N. C. Wyeth House and Studio	Chadds Ford	Delaware	Delaware Valley	Art	Tours operated by the Brandywine River Museum
Ned Smith Center for Nature and Art	Millersburg	Dauphin	Pennsylvania Dutch Country	Art	website, also a nature center
Nemacolin Castle	Brownsville	Fayette	Pittsburgh Metro Area	Historic house	Maintained by the Brownsville Historical Society, 19th-century mansion
New Berlin Heritage Museum	New Berlin	Union	Central PA	Local history	Open on New Berlin Day or by appointment, also known as the Courthouse Museum
New Holland Band Museum	New Holland	Lancaster	Pennsylvania Dutch Country	Music	website, band memorabilia, hundreds of musical instruments from 1620 to present day, uniforms, music and equipment
Newlin Mill Complex	Concord Township	Delaware	Delaware Valley	Mill	Two historic houses, barn, water-powered grist mill, visitor center in a park
Nicholas Stoltzfus Homestead	Wyomissing	Berks	Pennsylvania Dutch Country	Historic house	website, 18th-century house under restoration
Nitre Hall	Havertown	Delaware	Delaware Valley	Historic house	Operated by the Haverford Historical Society
No. 9 Coal Mine & Museum	Lansford	Carbon	Lehigh Valley	Industry - Coal	website
North East Museum	North East	Erie	Northwest Region	Local history	website, operated by the North East Historical Society
North Museum of Nature and Science	Lancaster	Lancaster	Pennsylvania Dutch Country	Natural history, Science	website
Oakes Museum of Natural History	Grantham	Cumberland	Pennsylvania Dutch Country	Natural history	website, part of Messiah College, dioramas of African and North American mammals, bird eggs, fish, seashells, minerals, insects & butterflies, fossils
Ohio Valley Lines Model Railroad, Library & Museum	Ambridge	Beaver	Pittsburgh Metro Area	Railroad	400 foot model operating railroad, depicts the late 1950s-1960s era from Ambridge/Pittsburgh local to Wheeling, West Virginia
Old Bedford Village	Bedford	Bedford	Laurel Highlands/Southern Alleghenies	Open air	Includes buildings from the 18th to early 20th centuries, living history demonstrations
Old Caln Historical Society Museum	Caln Township	Chester	Delaware Valley	Local history	Housed in part of a historic meeting house
Old Dry Road Farm	Lower Heidelberg Township	Berks	Pennsylvania Dutch Country	Farm	18th-century living history farm complex, open for school groups and special events
Old Eagle School	Tredyffrin	Chester	Delaware Valley	Education	One room schoolhouse
Old Economy Village	Ambridge	Beaver	Pittsburgh Metro Area	Religious	Last of three settlements established by the Harmony Society, administered by the Pennsylvania Historical and Museum Commission
Old Jail Museum	Chambersburg	Franklin	Cumberland Valley	Local history	Operated by the Franklin County Historical Society - Kittochtinny
Old Jail Museum	Jim Thorpe	Carbon	Lehigh Valley	Jail	Late-19th-century prison
Old Jail Museum	Smethport	McKean	Northern Tier	Prison	information, Facebook site, operated by the McKean County Historical Society
Old Line Museum	Delta	York	Pennsylvania Dutch Country	Local history	website
Olin Art Gallery	Washington	Washington	Pittsburgh Metro Area	Art	Part of the Olin Fine Arts Center at Washington & Jefferson College
Oliver Miller Homestead	South Park	Allegheny	Pittsburgh Metro Area	Historic house	Frontier stone house and spring house, reconstructed log house, blacksmith forge, barn, demonstration shed and gardens
Packwood House Museum	Lewisburg	Union	Pennsylvania Dutch Country	Decorative arts	Glass, ceramics, textiles, furniture, paintings, Pennsylvania German decorative arts, and Oriental art
Palmer Museum of Art	University Park	Centre	Central PA	Art	Part of Penn State University, collection includes American and European art, contemporary European and Japanese studio ceramics, Asian art, objects from ancient European, African, and Near Eastern cultures
Palmerton Area Heritage Center	State College	Centre	Central PA	Local history	website, operated by the Palmerton Area Historical Society
Paper Mill House Museum	Newtown Township	Delaware	Delaware Valley	Local history	Operated by the Newtown Square Historical Preservation Society, includes an 1850s era general store
Parry Mansion Museum	New Hope	Bucks	Delaware Valley	Historic house	website, home of the New Hope Historical Society
Passavant House	Zelienople	Butler	Pittsburgh Metro Area	Historic house	Operated by the Zelienople Historical Society, early 19th-century house reflecting over 150 years of family ownership
Pasto Agricultural Museum	University Park	Centre	Central PA	Agriculture	website, part of the College of Agricultural Sciences at Pennsylvania State University, historic agriculture tools, machinery and equipment, open by appointment
Paul R. Stewart Museum	Waynesburg	Greene	Pittsburgh Metro Area	Multiple	website, part of Waynesburg University, geology, Native American artifacts, local history, pottery and glassware
Payne Gallery	Bethlehem	Lehigh	Lehigh Valley	Art	website, part of Moravian College
Pearl S. Buck House	Perkasie	Bucks	Delaware Valley	Historic house	Home of American author Pearl Buck, 68-acre (280,000 m^{2}) estate, with 1825 stone farm house, gardens, greenhouses, cottage, milk house and renovated barn
Pennsbury Manor	Morrisville	Bucks	Delaware Valley	Historic house	Home of William Penn, administered by the Pennsylvania Historical and Museum Commission
Penn State All-Sports Museum	University Park	Centre	Central PA	Sports	Pennsylvania State University sports history and memorabilia
Penns Valley Area Historical Museum	Aaronsburg	Centre	Central PA	Local history	website
Pennsylvania Anthracite Heritage Museum	Scranton	Lackawanna	Northeastern Pennsylvania	Industry - Coal	Anthracite coal mining and industrial heritage of northeastern Pennsylvania, administered by the Pennsylvania Historical and Museum Commission
Pennsylvania German Cultural Heritage Center	Kutztown	Berks	Pennsylvania Dutch Country	Ethnic	website, part of Kutztown University of Pennsylvania, 42-acre (170,000 m^{2}) farm with buildings which show the life of the Pennsylvania Germans in the 18th and 19th centuries
Pennsylvania Governor's Mansion	Harrisburg	Dauphin	Cumberland Valley	Historic house	
Pennsylvania Longrifle Museum	Nazareth	Northampton	Lehigh Valley	Weaponry	website, operated by the Jacobsburg Historical Society
Pennsylvania Lumber Museum	Galeton	Potter	Northern Tier	Industry - Lumber	Documents the history and technology of the Commonwealth's forest industries, administered by the Pennsylvania Historical and Museum Commission
Pennsylvania Military Museum	Boalsburg	Centre	Central PA	Military	Recounts the story of Commonwealth citizen's who served our country in defense of the nation, administered by the Pennsylvania Historical and Museum Commission
Pennsylvania Military College Museum	Chester	Delaware	Delaware Valley	Military	website, Widener University's military history as the Pennsylvania Military Academy and Pennsylvania Military College
Pennsylvania National Fire Museum	Harrisburg	Dauphin	Cumberland Valley	Firefighting	
Pennsylvania State Capitol	Harrisburg	Dauphin	Cumberland Valley	History	
Pennsylvania State Police Museum	Hershey	Dauphin	Pennsylvania Dutch Country	Law enforcement	website, proposed museum
Pennsylvania Trolley Museum	Washington	Washington	Pittsburgh Metro Area	Transportation	
Pennsylvania Veterans Museum	Media	Delaware	Delaware Valley	Military	
Pennypacker Mills	Schwenksville	Montgomery	Delaware Valley	Historic house	National Historic site, 18th-century mansion and park
Peter Herdic Transportation Museum	Williamsport	Lycoming	Central PA	Transportation	website, vehicles for river, rail and road
Peter J. McGovern Little League Museum	South Williamsport	Lycoming	Central PA	Sports	
Peter Wentz Farmstead	Worcester	Montgomery	Delaware Valley	Historic house	18th-century Pennsylvania German farmstead
Phillips Museum of Art	Lancaster	Lancaster	Pennsylvania Dutch Country	Art	website, part of Franklin & Marshall College, collection includes decorative arts, Pennsylvania German material culture, ethnographic material
Pioneer Tunnel Coal Mine & Steam Train	Ashland	Schuylkill	Pennsylvania Dutch Country	Industry - Mining	website, anthracite coal mine tour, narrow-gauge steam train ride, museum
Piper Aviation Museum	Lock Haven	Clinton	Central PA	Transportation - Aviation	website
Pithole City	Pithole	Venango	Northwest Region	Industry	Ghost town of former oil boomtown; administered by the Pennsylvania Historical and Museum Commission and Drake Well Museum
Pocono Indian Museum	Bushkill	Pike	Northeastern Pennsylvania	Native American	website, history of the Delaware Indian
Police Heritage Museum	York	York	Pennsylvania Dutch Country	Law enforcement	website
Portage Station Museum	Portage	Cambria	Laurel Highlands/Southern Alleghenies	Local history	website, operated by the Portage Area Historical Society, influences of coal mining, railroads, steel, forests, water, and recreation
Potter County Historical Society/Museum	Coudersport	Potter	Northern Tier	Local history	Facebook site
Pottsgrove Manor	Pottsgrove	Montgomery	Delaware Valley	Historic house	Mid 18th-century period mansion
Philip P. Bliss Gospel Songwriters Museum	Rome	Bradford	Northern Tier	Biographical	Home of 19th century gospel music composer Phillip Paul Bliss
Promised Land State Park	Blooming Grove	Pike	Northeastern Pennsylvania	History	Includes the Masker Museum about the Civilian Conservation Corps and the park's natural history
Quaint Corner Children's Museum	Altoona	Blair	Laurel Highlands/Southern Alleghenies	Children's	website
Quiet Valley Living Historical Farm	Hamilton Township	Monroe	Northeastern Pennsylvania	Open air	Historic working farm with period interpreters reflecting farm family life from 1760 to 1913
Rachel Carson Homestead	Springdale	Allegheny	Pittsburgh Metro Area	Biographical	National Historic home of environmental author Rachel Carson
Railroad Museum of Pennsylvania	Strasburg	Lancaster	Pennsylvania Dutch Country	Transportation - Railroad	Administered by the Pennsylvania Historical and Museum Commission
Randyland	Pittsburgh	Allegheny	Pittsburgh Metro Area	Outsider Art	Colorful houses and public art museum spanning by painter Randy Gilson.
Railroaders Memorial Museum	Altoona	Blair	Laurel Highlands/Southern Alleghenies	Transportation - Railroad	
Reading Area Fire-Fighters Museum	Reading	Berks	Pennsylvania Dutch Country	Firefighting	website Historic 1876 fire station, open to public Saturdays 10-2 other times by appointment
Reading Public Museum	Reading	Berks	Pennsylvania Dutch Country	Multiple	Art, natural history, civilizations, planetarium, arboretum
Reading Railroad Heritage Museum	Hamburg	Berks	Pennsylvania Dutch Country	Transportation - Railroad	website, operated by the Reading Company Technical & Historical Society
Renfrew Museum and Park	Waynesboro	Franklin	Cumberland Valley	Open air	Restored early-19th-century farmstead and park
Richard Wall House	Elkins Park	Montgomery	Delaware Valley	Historic house	House dating back to the late 18th century, reflects two centuries of owners
Rivers of Steel	Homestead	Allegheny	Pittsburgh Metro Area	Industry - Steel	History of the area's steel, coal and related industries
Roadside America	Shartlesville	Berks	Delaware Valley	Transportation - Railroad	Miniature village and railway
Robert Fulton Birthplace	Quarryville	Lancaster	Pennsylvania Dutch Country	Biographical	
Rock Ford Plantation	Lancaster	Lancaster	Pennsylvania Dutch Country	Historic house	1794 Georgian mansion of General Edward Hand
Rockhill Trolley Museum	Rockhill Furnace	Huntingdon	Central PA	Transportation	Trolleys
Rough and Tumble Engineers Historical Association	Kinzers	Lancaster	Pennsylvania Dutch Country	Agriculture	Open seasonally, traction engines, antique farm implements and machinery, steam engines and stationary gas engines
Rowley House Museum	Williamsport	Lycoming	Central PA	Historic house	website, Victorian mansion operated by Preservation Williamsport
Saint Nicholas Chapel and Museum	Beaver	Beaver	Pittsburgh Metro Area	Religious	website, Greek Catholic church with museum of Greek Catholic Union, Greek Catholic, and Carpatho-Rusin histories
Sanderson Museum	Chadds Ford	Delaware	Delaware Valley	Local history	
Samek Art Museum	Lewisburg	Union	Pennsylvania Dutch Country	Art	website, part of Bucknell University, includes the Samek Gallery, the Downtown Gallery and locations around campus
Saylor Park Cement Industry Museum	Coplay	Lehigh	Lehigh Valley	Industry	Nine vertical cement kilns and exhibits about the American Portland Cement Industry, operated by the Lehigh County Historical Society
Sayre Historical Society Museum	Sayre	Bradford	Northern Tier	Local history	website
Schisler Museum of Wildlife & Natural History and McMunn Planetarium	East Stroudsburg	Monroe	Northeastern Pennsylvania	Natural history	Part of East Stroudsburg University of Pennsylvania
Schwenkfelder Library & Heritage Center	Pennsburg	Montgomery	Delaware Valley	Religious	Museum collections include Schwenkfelder history and decorative arts including fraktur
Schuylkill County Historical Society Museum	Pottsville	Schuylkill	Pennsylvania Dutch Country	Local history	website
Scranton Iron Furnaces	Scranton	Lackawanna	Northeastern Pennsylvania	Industry	Heritage of iron making in Pennsylvania
Sculpted Ice Works Factory Tour & Ice Harvest Museum	Lakeville	Wayne	Northeastern Pennsylvania	Industry	website, ice harvesting and modern ice making and carving
Seminary Ridge Museum	Gettysburg	Adams	Pennsylvania Dutch Country	Military	Focus is the pivotal first day of the Battle of Gettysburg on Seminary Ridge, the hospital use of the building, and cultural debates of the Civil War era
Sewickley Heights History Center	Sewickley	Allegheny	Pittsburgh Metro Area	Local history	website
Shippensburg Historical Society	Shippensburg	Franklin	Cumberland Valley	Local history	website, includes Central Pennsylvania Indian arrowheads and tools, WPA educational aids made in Shippensburg, medical collections and Shippensburg area pottery
Shippensburg University Fashion Archives and Museum	Shippensburg	Franklin	Cumberland Valley	Fashion	website
Shriver House Museum	Gettysburg	Adams	Pennsylvania Dutch Country	Historic house	website, 1860s period home of George Washington Shriver, experience of civilians during the Battle of Gettysburg
Sigal Museum	Easton	Northampton	Lehigh Valley	Local history	website, operated by the Northampton County Historical & Genealogical Society, county history and culture
Simpler Times Museum	Tidioute	Warren	Northwest Region	Ephemera	information, oil and gas production equipment, gasoline pumps, signs and globes, tractors and farm equipment and engines, antique cars and turn-of-the-20th-century exhibits, open by appointment
Sinking Spring Historical Society & Heritage Park	Sinking Spring	Berks	Pennsylvania Dutch Country	Local history	information
Slate Belt Heritage Center	Bangor	Northampton	Lehigh Valley	Local history	website, exhibits include a fire museum, town clock, council room, period rooms reflecting local ethnic and industrial heritage
Slate Belt Museum	Mt. Bethel	Northampton	Lehigh Valley	Local history	website
Slifer House Museum	Lewisburg	Union	Pennsylvania Dutch Country	Historic house	Mid 19th-century Victorian period mansion
Smock Heritage Museum	Smock	Fayette	Pittsburgh Metro Area	Local history	website, operated by the Smock Historical Society
Somerset Historical Center	Somerset	Somerset	Pittsburgh Metro Area	Open air	Rural heritage center, administered by the Pennsylvania Historical and Museum Commission
Sordoni Art Gallery	Wilkes-Barre	Luzerne	Northeastern Pennsylvania	Art	website, part of Wilkes University
South Side Historical Village	Hookstown	Beaver	Pittsburgh Metro Area	Open air	website, includes a restored 1874 Mercer one-room school house, blacksmith shop, 1800s log cabin showing rural home life, a brick bread oven, a general store, a barn with antique agriculture equipment and a doctor's office
Southern Alleghenies Museum of Art	Altoona	Blair	Laurel Highlands/Southern Alleghenies	Art	Quarterly art exhibitions and a collection of railroad photographic prints
Southern Alleghenies Museum of Art	Loretto	Cambria	Laurel Highlands/Southern Alleghenies	Art	Headquarters to the complex of four museum facilities, permanent collection of works of American art, located on the campus of Saint Francis University
Southern Alleghenies Museum of Art	Ligonier	Westmoreland	Laurel Highlands/Southern Alleghenies	Art	Includes permanent paperweight collection
Southern Alleghenies Museum of Art	Johnstown	Cambria	Laurel Highlands/Southern Alleghenies	Art	Housed in the Pasquerilla Performing Arts Center at the University of Pittsburgh at Johnstown
Speaker's House	Trappe	Montgomery	Delaware Valley	Historic house	18th-century home of Frederick August Muhlenberg, the First and Third Speaker of the United States House of Representatives
Springfield Heritage Museum	Springfield	Delaware	Delaware Valley	Local history	information, located in the McLaughlin Education Center at Springfield High School
Spring-Ford Area Historical Society Museum Complex	Royersford	Montgomery	Delaware Valley	Local history	website, includes William Lewin Farmhouse and Carolyn Fetterolf Gallery
Springfield Mills	Erdenheim	Montgomery	Delaware Valley	Mill	Restored 19th-century grist mill, operated by the Morris Arboretum
Springs Museum	Springs	Somerset	Pittsburgh Metro Area	Local history	website, operated by the Springs Historical Society
Square Tavern	Newtown Township	Delaware	Delaware Valley	History	Operated by the Newtown Square Historical Preservation Society, 18th-century-period tavern
State Museum of Pennsylvania	Harrisburg	Dauphin	Cumberland Valley	Multiple	Archaeological artifacts, minerals, paintings, decorative arts, animal dioramas, industrial and technological innovations and military objects; administered by the Pennsylvania Historical and Museum Commission
Steamtown National Historic Site	Scranton	Lackawanna	Northeastern Pennsylvania	Transportation - Railroad	Interprets the story of main line steam railroading between 1850 and 1950
The Stoogeum	Ambler	Montgomery	Delaware Valley	Biographical	website, dedicated entirely to The Three Stooges
Stover Mill Gallery	Erwinna	Bucks	Delaware Valley	Art	Regional art gallery located in a 19th-century gristmill, operated by the Tinicum Civic Association
Stoy Museum	Lebanon	Lebanon	Pennsylvania Dutch Country	Local history	website, operated by the Lebanon County Historical Society, recreated rooms of doctor's office, barber shop, school room, parlor, beauty salon, kitchen, general store, Cold Spring Train Station, wood shop
Stroud Mansion	Stroudsburg	Monroe	Northeastern Pennsylvania	History	Operated by the Monroe County Historical Association, social, cultural, political and economic life of Monroe County
Sturgeon House	Fairview	Erie	Pittsburgh Metro Area	Local history	Operated by the Fairview Area Historical Society
Sullivan County Historical Society Museum	Laporte	Sullivan	Northern Tier	Local history	website, also the Baldwin House, a historic house museum, is next door
Summerseat	Morrisville	Bucks	Delaware Valley	Historic house	Late-18th-century house used as a headquarters by George Washington
Sun Inn, Pennsylvania	Bethlehem	Lehigh	Lehigh Valley	Historic inn	website
Susquehanna Art Museum	Harrisburg	Dauphin	Cumberland Valley	Art	Contemporary art
Susquehanna County Historical Society Museum	Montrose	Susquehanna	Northern Tier	Local history	website
Susquehanna Depot Area Historical Society Museum	Susquehanna Depot	Susquehanna	Northern Tier	Local history	information
Sutton-Ditz House	Clarion	Clarion	Northwest Region	Historic house	Operated by the Clarion County Historical Society, late 19th-century mansion
Suzanne H. Arnold Art Gallery	Annville	Lebanon	Pennsylvania Dutch Country	Art	website, part of Lebanon Valley College
Swedish Log Cabin	Drexel Hill	Delaware	Delaware Valley	Historic house	18th-century log cabin
Swetland Homestead	Wyoming	Luzerne	Northeastern Pennsylvania	Historic house	19th-century period house, open by appointment with the Luzerne County Historical Society
Taylor Memorial Museum	Brockway	Jefferson	Central PA	Local history	website, operated by the Brockway Area Historical Society, features glass from local industry, artifacts from the lumbering, mining, and farming communities
Temple Judea Museum	Elkins Park	Montgomery	Delaware Valley	Ethnic	website, Judaica from around the world, located at Reform Congregation Keneseth Israel
The 1803 House	Emmaus	Lehigh	Lehigh Valley	Historic house	Also known as the Ehrenhardt House, lifestyle of the inhabitants of colonial Emmaus
Thomas Leiper Estate	Nether Providence Township	Delaware	Delaware Valley	Historic house	18th-century house
Thomas Massey House	Broomall	Delaware	Delaware Valley	Historic house	18th-century house with 17th- and 18th-century furnishings
Thomas T. Taber Museum	Williamsport	Lycoming	Central PA	Local history	website, operated by the Lycoming County Historical Society, features Native American and fine and decorative arts galleries, 19th-century-period rooms, and over 300 toy trains
Tioga Point Museum	Athens	Bradford	Northern Tier	Multiple	Includes Native American, Japanese, Turkish, Chinese, European and Middle Eastern art and cultural objects, local historical items
Tom Ridge Environmental Center	Erie	Erie	Northwest Region	Natural history	Located in Presque Isle State Park, local plants, animals, human and cultural history
Tour-Ed Mine and Museum	Tarentum	Allegheny	Pittsburgh Metro Area	Industry - Coal	website, coal mine and recreated home of a typical coal miner in the 1850s, general store items, tools and antiques
Toy Soldier Museum	Cresco	Monroe	Northeastern Pennsylvania	Toy	website, toy soldier displays, battle dioramas, civilian scenes, regimental militaria and uniforms
Trout Gallery	Carlisle	Cumberland	Cumberland Valley	Art	website, part of Dickinson College, in the Emil R. Weiss Center for the Arts
Trout Hall	Allentown	Lehigh	Lehigh Valley	Historic house	Operated by the Lehigh County Historical Society, late-18th-century Colonial mansion
Troxell-Steckel House	Egypt	Lehigh	Lehigh Valley	Historic house	Operated by the Lehigh County Historical Society, 1756 Pennsylvania-German farm house
Tyrone History Museum	Tyrone	Blair	Laurel Highlands/Southern Alleghenies	Local history	website, operated by the Tyrone Area Historical Society
Union City Historical Society Museum	Union City	Erie	Northwest Region	Local history	website, unusual items of everyday use from the 18th- and 19th-century rural and urban life
University Museum of Indiana University of Pennsylvania	Indiana	Indiana	Pittsburgh Metro Area	Art	website, located in John Sutton Hall, also Kipp Gallery
Upper Mill	Milford	Pike	Northeastern Pennsylvania	Mill	Restored 19th-century grist mill
U.S. Army Heritage and Education Center	Carlisle	Cumberland	Cumberland Valley	Military	Includes Army Heritage Museum and Army Heritage Trail
Valley Forge National Historical Park	Valley Forge	Chester	Delaware Valley	History	Includes Welcome Center with exhibits, Washington's Headquarters (Valley Forge), Washington Memorial Chapel, reconstructed works and buildings
Valley School Museum	Albion	Erie	Northwest Region	School	information
Venango County Historical Society Museum	Franklin	Venango	Northwest Region	Historic house	website, known as the Hoge-Osmer House
Vicary Mansion	Freedom	Beaver	Pittsburgh Metro Area	Historic house	Operated by the Beaver County Historical Research and Landmarks Foundation, early-19th-century mansion under restoration
Victorian Vandergrift Museum and Historical Society	Vandergrift	Westmoreland	Pittsburgh Metro Area	Local history	information
Vocal Group Hall of Fame	Sharon	Mercer	Northwest Region	Music	
Wagner–Ritter House & Garden	Johnstown	Cambria	Laurel Highlands/Southern Alleghenies	Historic house	19th-century working-class family home
Wallace-Cross Mill	East Hopewell Township	York	Pennsylvania Dutch Country	Mill	Restored 19th-century grist mill
Walnutport Canal & Locktenders House	Walnutport	Northampton	Lehigh Valley	Historic house	information, information, restored early 19th-century locktender's house, part of the Delaware and Lehigh National Heritage Corridor
Washington Crossing Historic Park	Washington Crossing	Bucks	Delaware Valley	Open air	13 historic buildings that mark the location where George Washington crossed the Delaware River during the American Revolutionary War; administered by the Pennsylvania Historical and Museum Commission
Wattsburg Historical Society Museum	Wattsburg	Erie	Northwest Region	Local history	information
Wayne County Historical Society Museums	Honesdale	Wayne	Northeastern Pennsylvania	Local history	website, includes main museum, J.B. Park Farm Museum, Bethel School, Old Stone Jail
Waynesborough	Paoli	Chester	Delaware Valley	Historic house	18th-century home of Gen. Anthony Wayne, operated by the Philadelphia Society for the Preservation of Landmarks
Weather Discovery Center	Punxsutawney	Jefferson	Central PA	Science	website, weather lore stories, exhibits and demonstrations
Western Pennsylvania Model Railroad Museum	Gibsonia	Allegheny	Pittsburgh Metro Area	Transportation - Railroad	History of railroads in western Pennsylvania through model railroading
Westmoreland Museum of American Art	Greensburg	Westmoreland	Pittsburgh Metro Area	Art	Works by significant American artists, including Mary Cassatt, John Singer Sargent and Winslow Homer
West Overton Village	Scottdale	Westmoreland	Pittsburgh Metro Area	Open air	19th-century rural industrial village
Wharton Esherick Museum	Malvern	Chester	Delaware Valley	Art	Studio of wood sculptor Wharton Esherick
Wheatland	Lancaster	Lancaster	Pennsylvania Dutch Country	Presidential Home	Home of President James Buchanan
Whitaker Center for Science and the Arts	Harrisburg	Dauphin	Cumberland Valley	Science	Complex includes Harsco Science Center, Sunoco Performance Theater and an IMAX theater
Widener University Art Gallery	Chester	Delaware	Delaware Valley	Art	website, collection includes 19th and 20th-century American paintings, 19th-century European paintings, 18th and 19th-century Asian art
Wilbur Chocolate Factory & Candy Americana Museum	Lititz	Lancaster	Pennsylvania Dutch Country	Food	History of chocolate and the Wilbur Chocolate Company
Wilder Museum	Irvine	Warren	Northwest Region	Local history	website, operated by the Warren County Historical Society
William Brinton 1704 House	West Chester	Delaware	Delaware Valley	Historic house	Stone Quaker home, National Historic Landmark
William E. Swigart Jr. Antique Automobile Museum	Huntingdon	Huntingdon	Central PA	Transportation - Automotive	Features antique automobiles, artwork, bicycles, toys and automobile memorabilia
Williams Center Art Gallery	Easton	Northampton	Lehigh Valley	Art	website, part of Lafayette College
Williams House	Paupack	Wayne	Northeastern Pennsylvania	Historic house	website, operated by the Wallenpaupack Historical Society
Wings of Freedom Aviation Museum	Willow Grove	Montgomery	Delaware Valley	Transportation - Aviation	
Winters Heritage House Museum	Elizabethtown	Lancaster	Pennsylvania Dutch Country	Historic house	website
Wolf Museum of Music and Art	Lancaster	Lancaster	Pennsylvania Dutch Country	Music, Art	website, features 19th and early 20th century furniture, paintings by the Philadelphia Ten, recitals on two 1915 Knabe concert grand pianos
Woodmont	Gladwyne	Montgomery	Delaware Valley	Historic house	Late-19th-century mansion and estate, history of International Peace Mission movement and Father Divine
Woodville Plantation	Bridgeville	Allegheny	Pittsburgh Metro Area	Historic house	Late-18th-century plantation house, depicts life from 1780 to 1820
World of Scouting Museum	Valley Forge	Chester	Delaware Valley	Scouting	website, Girl & Boy Scout memorabilia, open by appointment
Wright's Ferry Mansion	Columbia	Lancaster	Pennsylvania Dutch Country	Historic house	Restored 1750s period Quaker home with Philadelphia furniture, English ceramics, needlework, metals and glass
Wyalusing Valley Museum	Wyalusing	Bradford	Northern Tier	Local history	website, operated by the Wyalusing Valley Museum Association
Wyoming County Historical Museum	Tunkhannock	Wyoming	Northern Tier	Local history	website, operated by the Wyoming County Historical Society
York College Art Galleries	York	York	Pennsylvania Dutch Country	Art	website, part of York College of Pennsylvania
York County History Center	York	York	Pennsylvania Dutch Country	Multiple	website, includes the Historical Society Museum and Library, Agricultural and Industrial Museum, Bonham House, Fire Museum, General Horatio Gates House and Golden Plough Tavern, Barnett Bobb House
Zane Grey Museum	Lackawaxen	Pike	Northeastern Pennsylvania	Biographical	Home and works of author Zane Grey
Zeigler House	Dalmatia	Northumberland	Central PA	Local history	website, library and museum of the Mahanoy & Mahantongo Historical & Preservation Society, open by appointment
Zoellner Arts Center	Bethlehem	Northampton	Lehigh Valley	Art	Arts center for Lehigh University, includes an art gallery
Zoller Gallery	University Park	Centre	Central PA	Art	website, part of Penn State in the Visual Arts Building

== Defunct museums ==
- American Civil War Wax Museum, Gettysburg, collections now at the Gettysburg Heritage Center
- American Museum of Veterinary Medicine, Birdsboro, closed in 2010, collections donated to the University of Wisconsin School of Veterinary Medicine
- Americana Museum of Bird-in-Hand, Bird-in-Hand, closed in 206, small town America at the dawn of the 20th century, included a barber shop, woodworking shop, tea parlor, print shop, millinery, toy store, blacksmith shop, tobacco shop, apothecary, wheelwright shop, and a country general store
- Baker-Dungan Museum, Beaver
- Easton Museum of Pez Dispensers, Easton,
- Eddie's Toy Museum & Store, Monroe
- George Westinghouse Museum, Wilmerding, closed in 2007, collection now part of the Heinz History Center
- Hall of Presidents Exhibit, Gettysburg, closed in 2016, contents auctioned
- Hazel Kibler Memorial Museum, Girard, operated by the West County Historical Association
- Heritage Center Museum, Lancaster, closed in 2011
- JEM Classic Car Museum, Andreas, collection sold in 2003
- Jewish Museum of Eastern Pennsylvania, Pottsville, closed in 2014
- Kready's Country Store Museum, Lititz
- Lancaster County Quilts and Textile Museum, closed in 2011
- Marx Toy Museum, Erie, closed April 2008, now online only
- Mary Stolz Doll Museum, Bushkill, closed in 2005
- Mary Merritt Doll and Early Childhood Museum, Douglassville, closed in December 2005.
- Museum of Erie GE History, Erie
- National Philatelic Museum, Philadelphia, opened in 1948, closed in 1959
- Old Mauch Chunk Model Train Display, Jim Thorpe, closed in 2012
- Pennsylvania Fishing Museum at Pecks Pond, Dingmans Ferry
- People's Place Quilt Museum, Intercourse, closed in 2013
- Round Top Museum, Gettysburg, collections now part of the Gettysburg Heritage Center
- Soldiers National Museum, Gettysburg, closed in 2014 and contents auctioned
- Sones Farm & Home Museum, Muncy, closed in 2017
- Toy Robot Museum, Adamstown
- Windber Coal Heritage Center, Windber, operated by the Eureka Coal Heritage Foundation, closed in 2014

== See also ==
- Nature Centers in Pennsylvania
- List of historical societies in Pennsylvania

== Resources ==
- Pennsylvania Historical and Museum Commission
- Pennsylvania Federation of Museums and Historical Organizations
