= Harris Tower =

Harris Tower may refer to:

- Harris Switch Tower, an interlocking tower in Harrisburg, Pennsylvania
- Harris Tower (Atlanta), building that is a part of Peachtree Center in downtown Atlanta, Georgia
