= Goundie House =

Historic Building

1810 Goundie House
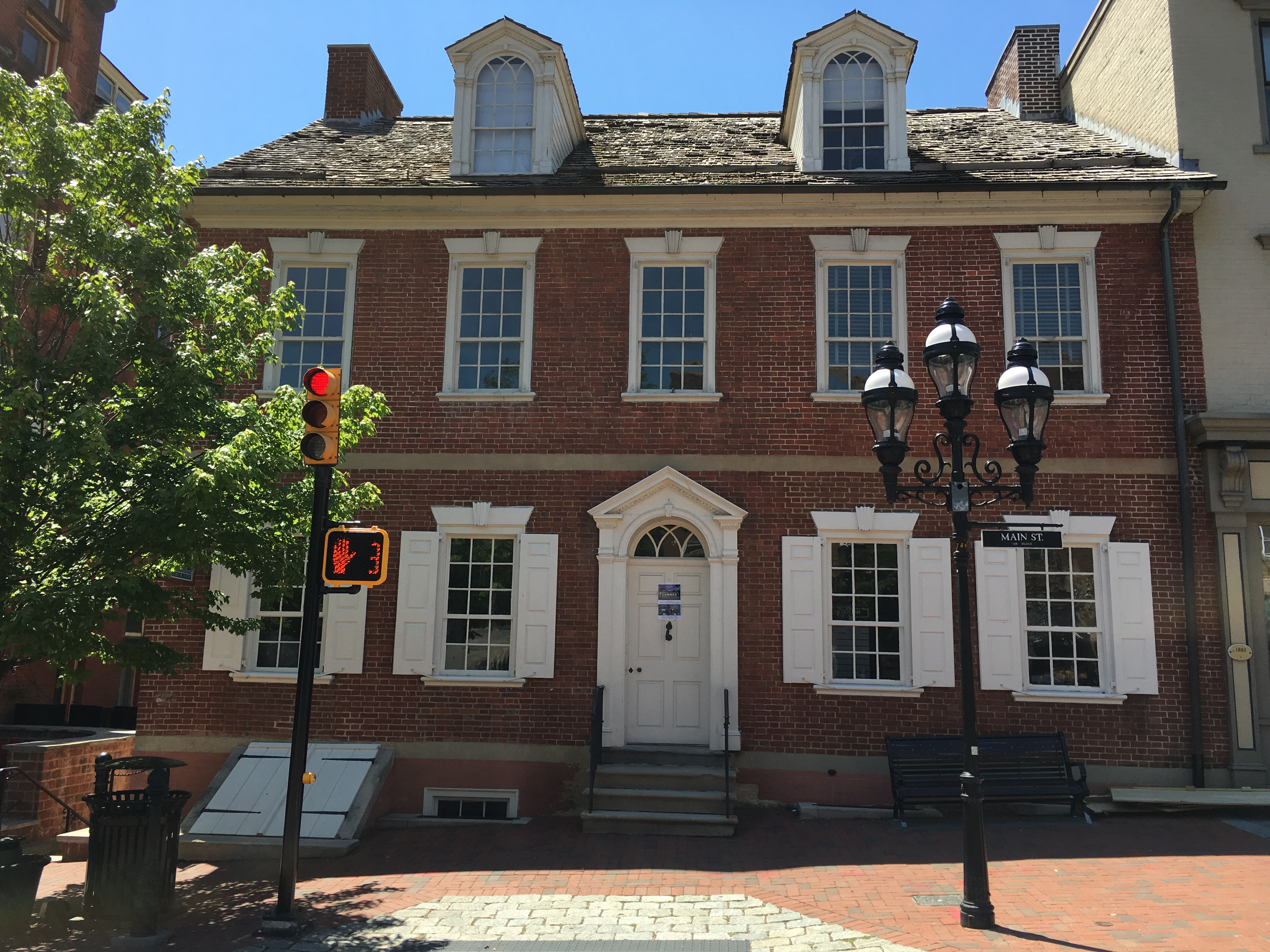

- Location within Pennsylvania Location within the United States
- 40°37′15″N 75°22′56″W
- Location: Bethlehem, Pennsylvania

History
- Built: 1810
- Built for: Private Residence
- Original use: Town Brewer’s Residence

Site notes
- Architectural style: American Federal
- Restored: 1980s
- Restored by: Historic Bethlehem Inc.
- Current use: Historic Tours, Exhibitions, Programming, Pop-Up Vintage Market
- Governing body: Local
- Website: HistoricBethlehem.org

The Goundie House (/ˈɡʌndiː/ GUN-dee) is a historic building located in Bethlehem, Pennsylvania. Built in 1810 for the Moravian town brewer John Sebastian Goundie, it is believed to be Bethlehem's first brick residence and the first private home to reflect the American Federal style. The house is now used as a museum and exhibition space and for pop-up vintage shops. It is a contributing property to the Historic Moravian Bethlehem District, which was designated a National Historic Landmark District in 2012 and later named to the U.S. Tentative List in 2016 for nomination to the World Heritage List.

== Description and history ==
John Sebastian Goundie first arrived in Bethlehem, Pennsylvania on Friday morning, July 23, 1802. A trained brewer from Neuwied, Germany, he had come to America to fulfill the role of Brewer in Salem, North Carolina at the invitation of the Moravian Congregation. Passing through Bethlehem, he left for Salem on September 26, 1802 and then returned after only a few months on May 31, 1803. The reasons for his departure from Salem are largely unknown, some sources claim he deemed the site chosen for the brewery there as “less than satisfactory.” After talks with Bethlehem's community leader, Bishop George Henry Loskiel, it was agreed Goundie would take on the task of brew master from Brother George Ising.

Goundie was a forward thinking, ambitious young businessman whose ideas often chafed the local governance, the Aufseher Collegium. He married a young widow named Cornelia Andreas on November 21, 1804 and by 1808 had acquired enough money to want to buy a house. He was also interested in purchasing a house in town–property that the Collegium owned. The Collegium used their lot system, which left the decision to God's will by drawing the result from a lot box–a method that had become more distrusted by the community in the early 19th century. The lot was drawn on October 31 and Goundie was denied his rights to the requested houses. According to Collegium minutes Goundie had to be “calmed down” after it was announced and “he expressed his frustration by stating that he was going to teach the brewing business to someone else and move to the Moravian community at Lititz.”

By 1810, however, Goundie had built the house he wanted. A paper issued by the Moravian Archives in 1970 tells of an engraving that clearly depicts the house and the lease on the property from the church for the building constructed by Goundie. There is no explanation or records stating as to how this came about.

The house was unlike any other in the community and is considered to be the first brick residence built in the American Federal style in Bethlehem, a vast departure from the German Colonial style stone buildings. It is a five-bay, 2 1/2-story building measuring 40 ft by 33 ft with an interior plan featuring a main hall with two rooms on either side on both the first and second floors. The beehive oven connecting fireplaces on both the first and second floor is one of its distinctive features. Goundie lived here with his wife and six children, four of which survived to adulthood.

In 1811 Goundie voiced concerns about continuing his brewing at the site behind the Single Brethrens’ House. The water he used in his brewing process from the Monocacy Creek was contaminated by the Tannery's operations. He decided a new brewery must be built and suggested a location near his house by the dam of the mill race. “After some delay, the group [the Collegium] went along with Goundie’s request. The new brewery went in, and 1812 became a year of much activity. Goundie constructed a cistern on his property, tore down an old dwelling that had housed one of his workers, and erected a malt house and dryer for making brandy.” His product was to the satisfaction of the community where in the minutes of the Aufseher Collegium for February 3, 1812, that “Goundie’s beer making was better than the more expensive way being used in Philadelphia.”

Over the years Goundie continued to perfect his brewing and also participated in the civic affairs of the town. In 1820 he was named fire-inspector and later in 1822 he was suggested for the post of Mayor, though he turned the position down. By the late 1820s, he had been elected to the Overseers Board and was a member of the Building Lot Committee. The construction of the Lehigh Canal in 1827 brought to Bethlehem times of economic and cultural change. Despite great challenges seen through the industrialization of Bethlehem, Goundie continued to thrive. By the 1830s he had completely withdrawn from his position as brew master and teamed up with the prominent local Rice family to pursue privatized industries.

In 1832, Goundie built a connected dry-goods store next door to the house to be managed by his daughter and son-in-law, John Schropp. In 1852, Goundie sold his home to Louis Beckel for $5,070. Beckel enlarged the building, adding a third floor and decorative elements in the 1880s. Goundie died shortly after. Following his death, the house served in many capacities to various owners. It passed through a total of nine different owners and was a doctor's office, boarding house, shoe repair shop, sewing machine shop, dressmaker's shop, real estate office, professional offices for an accountant, a lawyer, an optician, a photographer, beauty shop, and travel agency.

In 1968, the house was set for demolition but was stopped by Christine Sims, wife of Ivor D. Sims, executive vice president of Bethlehem Steel, and her friend Frances Martin, wife of Bethlehem Steel CEO Edmund Martin. Sims and Martin effectively brought about the cancellation of the demolition and later that year Historic Bethlehem purchased the building for $22,000 with fund-raised money. Through the 1980s the house was restored to its original appearance with the help of Mrs. Sims, Mrs. Martin, and supporters of Historic Bethlehem.

During the restoration process, the original doorway that linked Goundie's house with Schropp Shop (today's Historic Bethlehem Visitor Center) was discovered and preserved, as well as an 1870s pressed tin ceiling. Today, the 1810 Goundie House is a museum that provides exhibition and programming space, historic tours, and pop-up shops in conjunction with the Historic Bethlehem Visitor Center. The building is owned by Historic Bethlehem Inc., a member institution of Historic Bethlehem Museums & Sites, a 501(c)3 non-profit organization.
