= Harris Switch Tower =

- Harris Switch Tower, Pennsylvania Railroad
- U.S. National Register of Historic Places
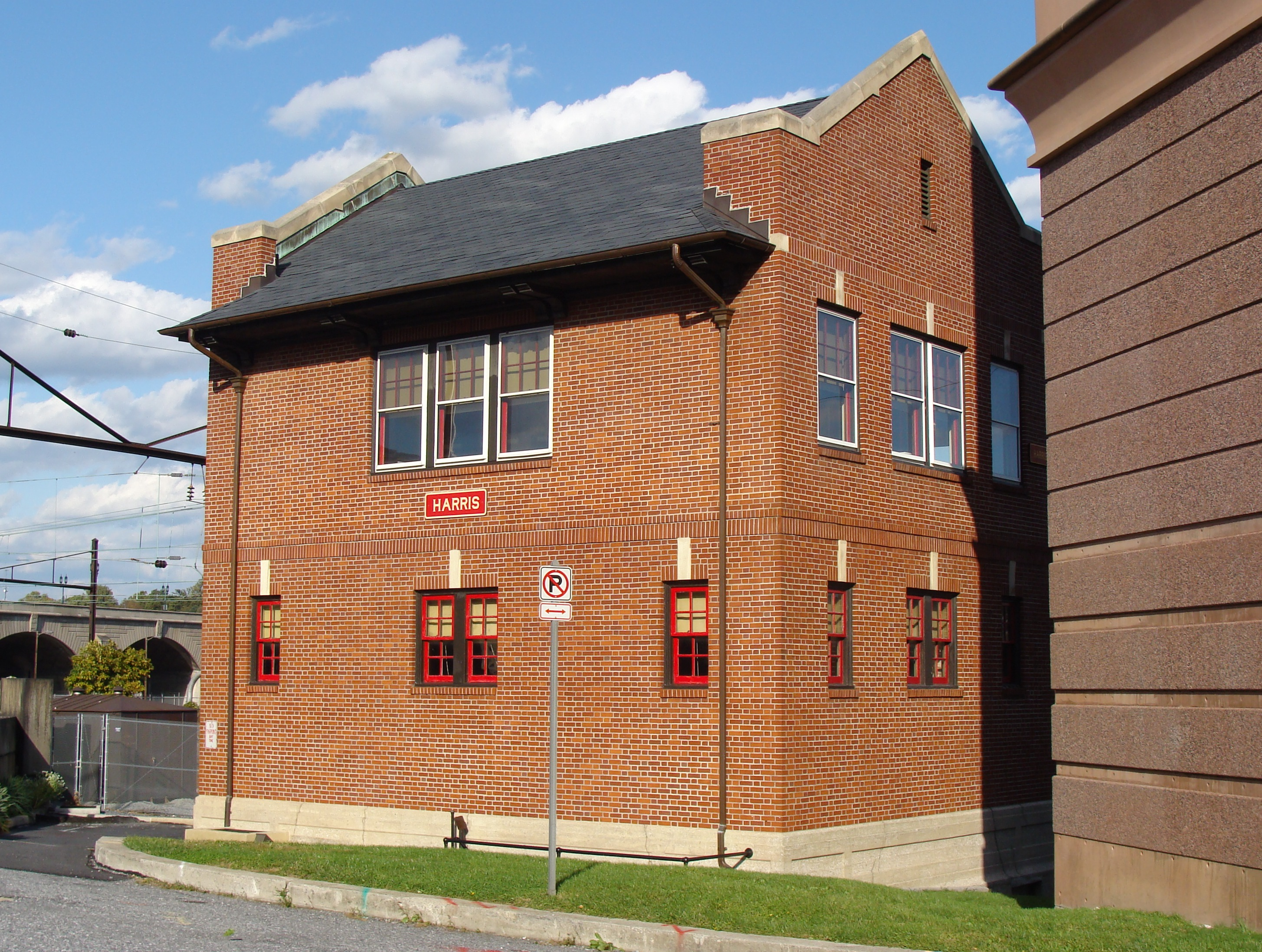
- Harris Switch Tower, October 2011

- Location within Pennsylvania
- Location: 637 Walnut Street; Harrisburg, Pennsylvania; United States
- Coordinates: 40°15′54.3″N 76°52′44.3″W
- Built: 1929
- Architectural style: Colonial Revival
- NRHP reference No.: 94001056
- Added to NRHP: August 30, 1994

Harris Switch Tower, also known as HG Tower or Harris Tower, is an interlocking tower in Harrisburg, Pennsylvania in the United States. The tower was built in 1929 by the Pennsylvania Railroad and remained in operation until it was closed in 1991 by Amtrak. Harris was purchased by the local chapter of the National Railway Historical Society in 1992 and listed on the National Register of Historic Places in 1994.

== Design ==
Harris Tower is a two-story, Colonial Revival-structure located at 7th & Walnut Streets in Harrisburg, Pennsylvania. It is situated southeast of the Pennsylvania State Capitol Complex and between the State Street Bridge and the Harrisburg Transportation Center. Its Flemish bond brickwork sits atop a partially exposed, concrete foundation; the stories are visually separated by a soldier course.

The second floor contains the tower's interlocking machine, used to control signals and switches. The Union Switch & Signal Model 14 machine contains many steel bars that interlock with one another to prevent conflicts and sudden changes that could cause a derailment The machine is 24 feet 10 inches (7.6 m) long, 6 feet 6 inches (2.0 m) wide and 4 feet 4 inches (1.3 m) tall. The front has 113 levers which were used to control all of the switches and signals in Harris Tower's territory. A 4-foot-4-inch (1.3 m) tall model board is mounted above the machine. More than 450 indicator lamps of the model board show the current position of switches, locations of trains within the interlocking limits, and whether the overhead electric catenary is energized.

== History ==
The Pennsylvania Railroad completed its main line across the Allegheny Mountains, connecting Philadelphia to Pittsburgh, in 1854. By the 1870s, the Pennsylvania had connected New York City to Chicago and St. Louis; consequently, all freight and passenger traffic from New York, Philadelphia, Baltimore and Washington, D.C., had to pass through Harrisburg before heading west. Harris Tower, then called HG Tower from its call sign when railroad communications were sent via telegraph, was built in 1929. It replaced three nearby towers that had been constructed in 1889. The consolidation reduced the manpower needed to control the 3,300 feet (1,000 m) and 15 sets of tracks north of Pennsylvania Station from 21 to 12. Harris Tower was put into service on April 26, 1930.

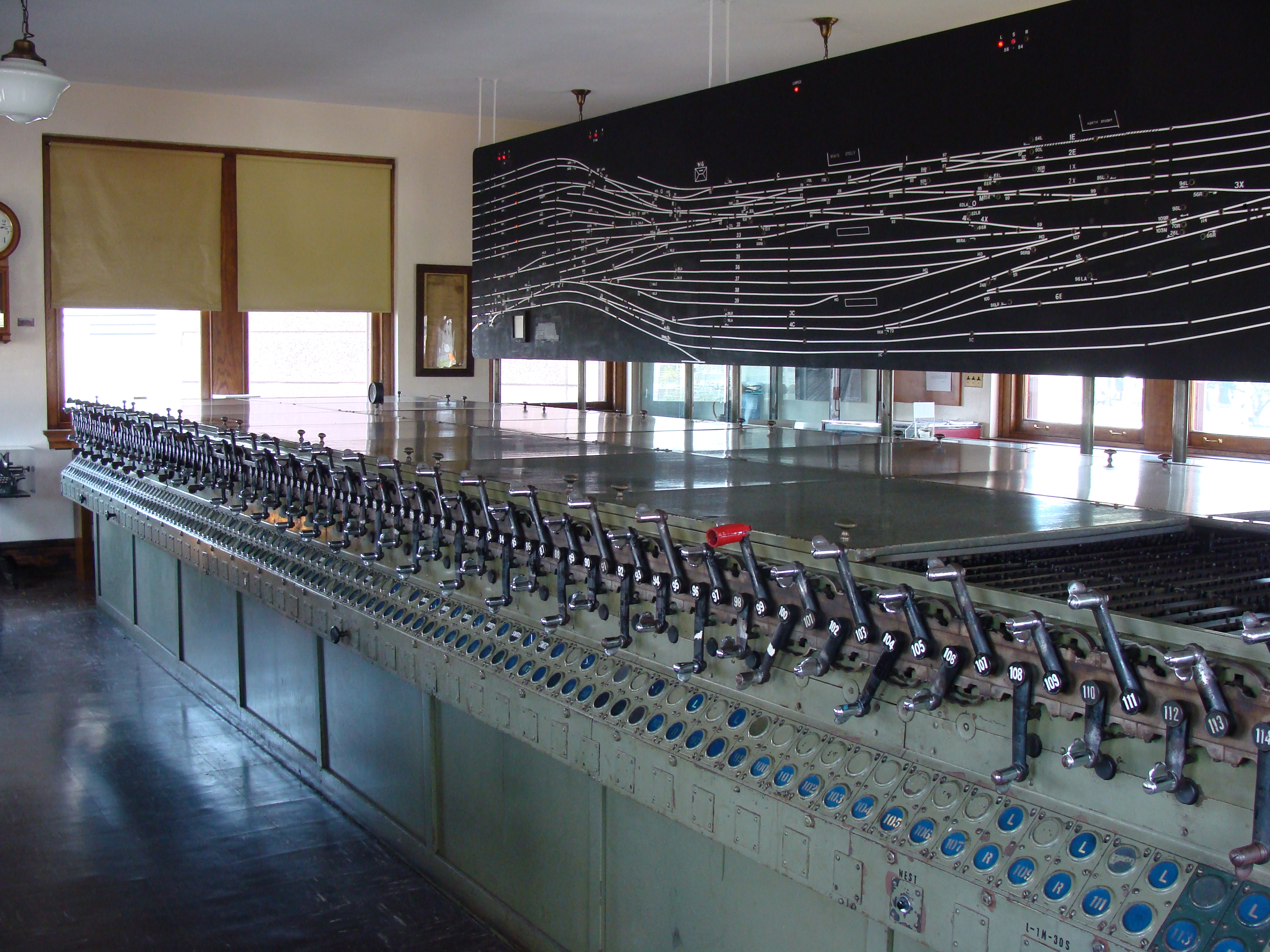
The US&S interlocking machine inside the tower

Some of the tracks controlled by Harris were removed, and the model board revised, when a new engine terminal was built in conjunction with the electrification of the line between Harrisburg and Philadelphia in 1938. The territory controlled by Harris Tower marked the western end of the electrification of the Pennsylvania Railroad's passenger lines. The engine terminal assisted in the switching of electric locomotives to steam or diesel locomotives for the trip west of Harrisburg. The Pennsylvania merged with the New York Central Railroad in 1968 to form Penn Central. In 1971, Amtrak took over intercity passenger service from Penn Central and also took possession of many ex-Pennsylvania Railroad tracks and facilities, including Harris Tower. Penn Central was taken over by Conrail in 1976. Conrail modernized its signalling control system in 1989 and consolidated it into a centralized traffic control facility located north of Harrisburg. Consequently, Harris Tower was reduced to controlling only four Amtrak trains a day. Amtrak combined the functions of Harris Tower with the nearby State Tower located in the Harrisburg Transportation Center on November 15, 1991, and closed the tower.

=== Current operations ===
On July 24, 1992, the Harrisburg chapter of the National Railway Historical Society purchased Harris Tower from Amtrak. The chapter opened the tower to the public as a museum, as well as allow visitors to operate the interlocking machine. Instead of controlling a network of signals and switches, it is connected to a computer which simulates train movements through the interlocking. The simulation uses Pennsylvania Railroad timetables from the early 1940s when the rail traffic at the tower was busiest. The tower is popular with railfans as an observation point for the numerous Amtrak and Norfolk Southern trains that regularly pass it. The tower was listed on the National Register of Historic Places on August 30, 1994.

== See also ==
- List of museums in Pennsylvania
- National Register of Historic Places listings in Dauphin County, Pennsylvania

== Sources ==
- Loser, Matthew; et al. (December 7, 1993). "Pennsylvania SP Harris Switch Tower, Pennsylvania Railroad". National Register of Historic Places Registration Form. National Archives and Records Administration.
- Mayer, F. G. (December 1930). "New Interlocking on Pennsylvania at Harrisburg Replaces Three Old Plants" (PDF). Railway Signaling. 23 (12). Chicago: Simmons-Boardman: 443–446.
- "Railroad tower at end of line". The Patriot-News. Harrisburg. November 15, 1991. p. B1.
