= Barns-Brinton House =

Historic house in Pennsylvania, United States

- U.S. National Register of Historic Places
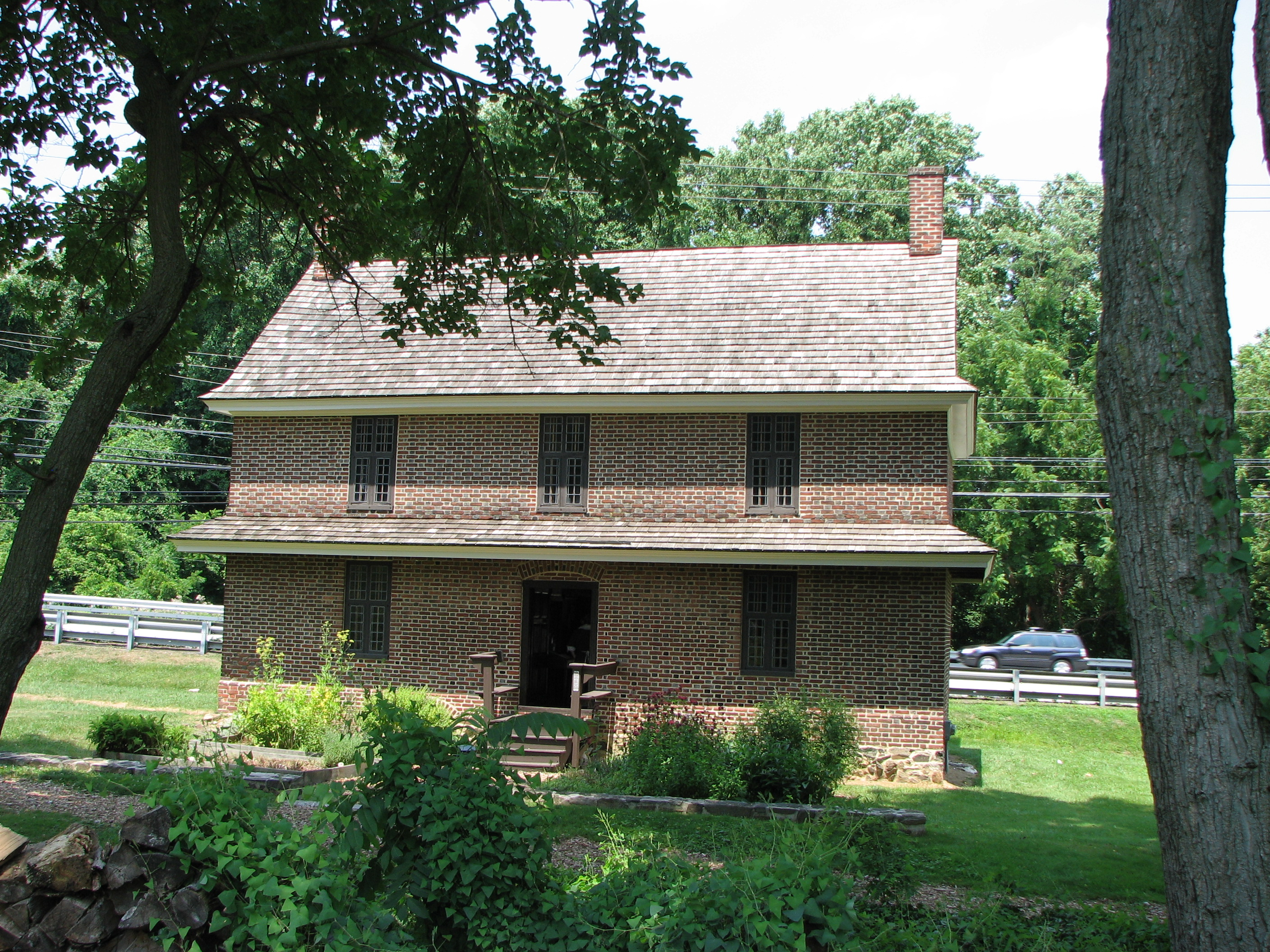
- Originally the front of the Barns-Brinton House, this became the rear when U.S. Route 1 was moved behind it.

- Location within Pennsylvania Location within the United States
- Location: East of Hamorton on U.S. Route 1, Pennsbury Township, Pennsylvania
- Coordinates: 39°52′24″N 75°37′35″W
- Area: 1.5 acres (0.61 ha)
- Built: 1714
- NRHP reference No.: 71000692
- Added to NRHP: May 27, 1971

The Barns-Brinton House is an historic brick house located between Hamorton and Chadds Ford, Pennsylvania in Pennsbury Township, Chester County, Pennsylvania. It was constructed in 1714 by William Barns, who operated it as a tavern from 1722 until his death in 1731.

It was added to the National Register of Historic Places in 1971.

== History and features ==
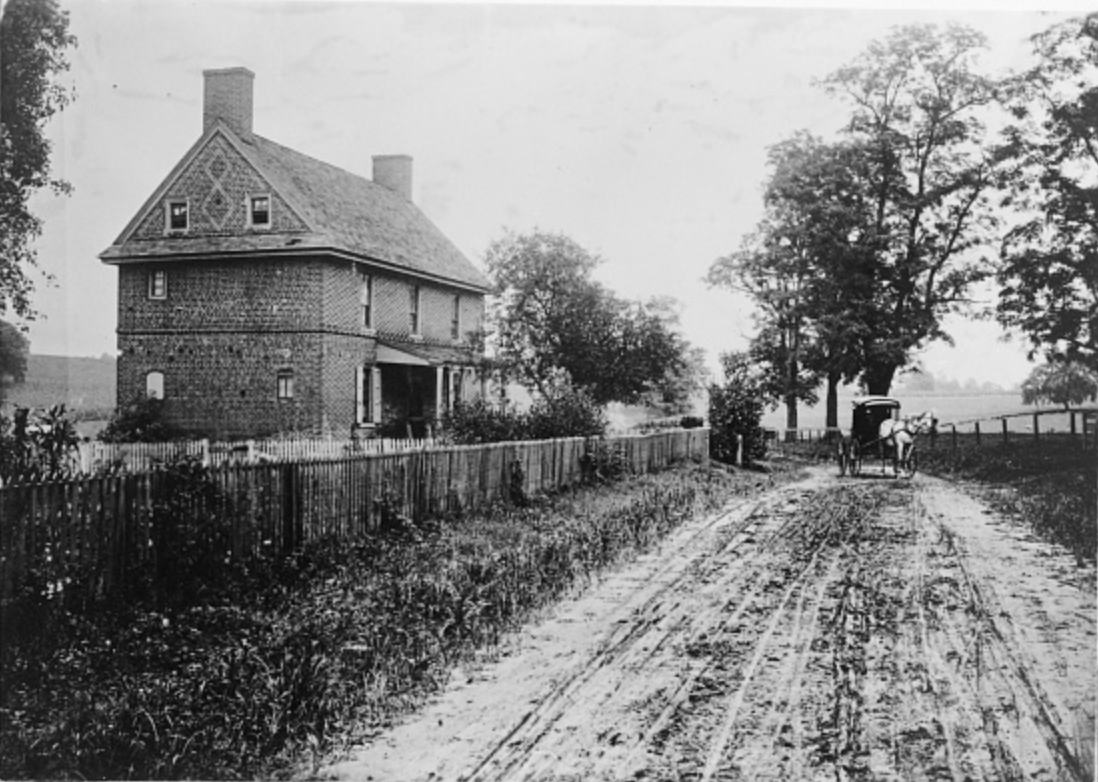
Photograph of Barns-Brinton House in 1905

Built in 1714 by William Barns, the Barns-Brinton House was operated as a tavern from 1722 until Barns' death in 1731.

The tract with the house and additional land was subsequently purchased by two others, the latter of whom, James Brinton, was the property owner when the house was endangered by the 1777 approach of Hessian General Wilhelm von Knyphausen, as he marched his British troops to the Battle of Brandywine during the Revolutionary War.

It remained in Brinton's family until 1859, then passed through several owners until the property was purchased and restored by the Chadds Ford Historical Society in 1969.

=== Present day ===
The house is owned and operated by the Chadds Ford Historical Society as a historic house museum, as well as the John Chads House.
