= Golden Plough Tavern =

Historic tavern in Pennsylvania, United States

- Gen. Horatio Gates House and Golden Plough Tavern
- U.S. National Register of Historic Places
- Pennsylvania state historical marker
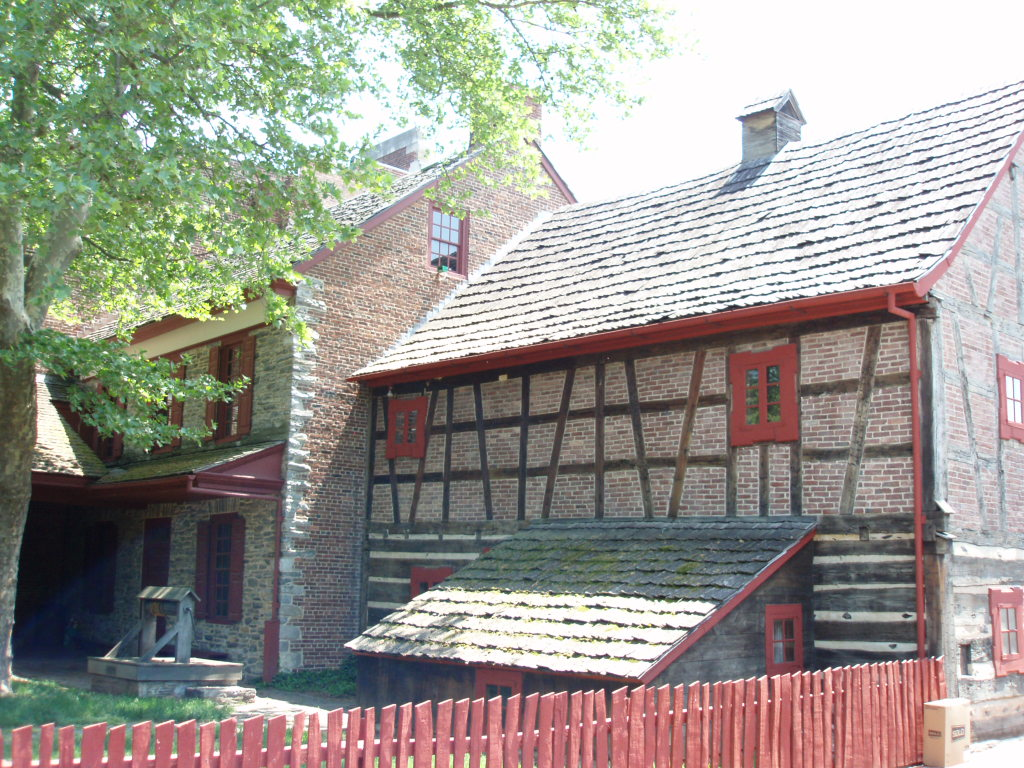

- Location within Pennsylvania Location within the United States
- Location: 157–159 W. Market St. York, Pennsylvania
- Coordinates: 39°57′43″N 76°43′47″W
- Area: 1 acre (0.40 ha)
- Built: 1741
- Built by: Joseph Chambers
- Architectural style: Georgian
- NRHP reference No.: 71000737

Significant dates
- Added to NRHP: December 6, 1971
- Designated PHMC: June 23, 1967

The Gen. Horatio Gates House and Golden Plough Tavern are two connecting historic buildings which are located in downtown York, York County, Pennsylvania. The buildings were restored between July 1961 and June 1964, and are operated as a museum by the York County History Center.

== Gates house ==
The General Horatio Gates House was built by Joseph Chambers in 1751, and connected to the Golden Plough Tavern through a shared kitchen. It is a 2 1/2-story, brick and limestone dwelling in the Georgian-style.

It was the home of General Horatio Gates (1727–1806), while the Second Continental Congress convened in York, September 30, 1777, to June 27, 1778, and was added to the National Register of Historic Places in 1971.

== Tavern ==
The Golden Plough Tavern was built by Martin Eichelberger in 1741 and is a two-story, Germanic-influenced medieval style building. The tavern is quite significant for its age and social history but is also an exceptional museum of historic carpentry and vernacular architecture.

The ground floor wall construction is a rare type which blends timber framing with log building. These walls are framed and the spaces between the posts are infilled with hewn beams, each beam fitted into its own mortise, and the gaps between the beams chinked with stones and mud like a log cabin. This construction technique is similar to timber framing infilled with planks known by many names including post-and-plank.

The upper walls are half timbered in a Germanic style with brick nog and wattle and daub infill. Half timbered buildings in America are relatively rare, generally found in some areas settled by German immigrants.

The roof structure is framed with a Germanic type of truss called a liegender stuhl directly translated as a "lying chair" where chair has the general meaning of support. Liegender stuhl trusses in Europe are found in Switzerland and Germany.

The wood shingles on the roof are also a rare type for America.

The Barnett Bobb Log House was moved to this location in 1968.

The tavern was added to the National Register of Historic Places in 1971.

== Gallery ==
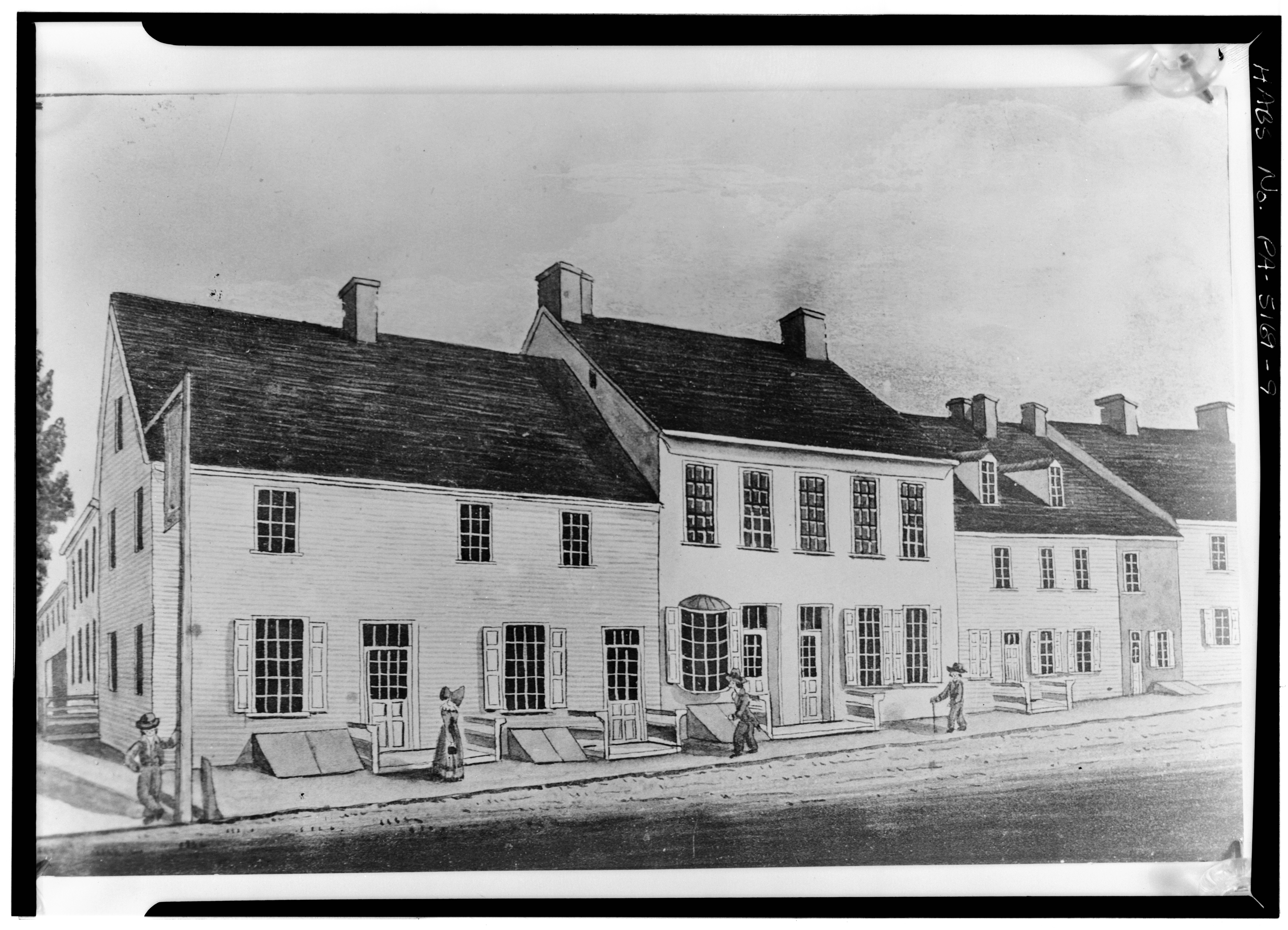
Circa-1830 drawing of the buildings, York County Historical Society.

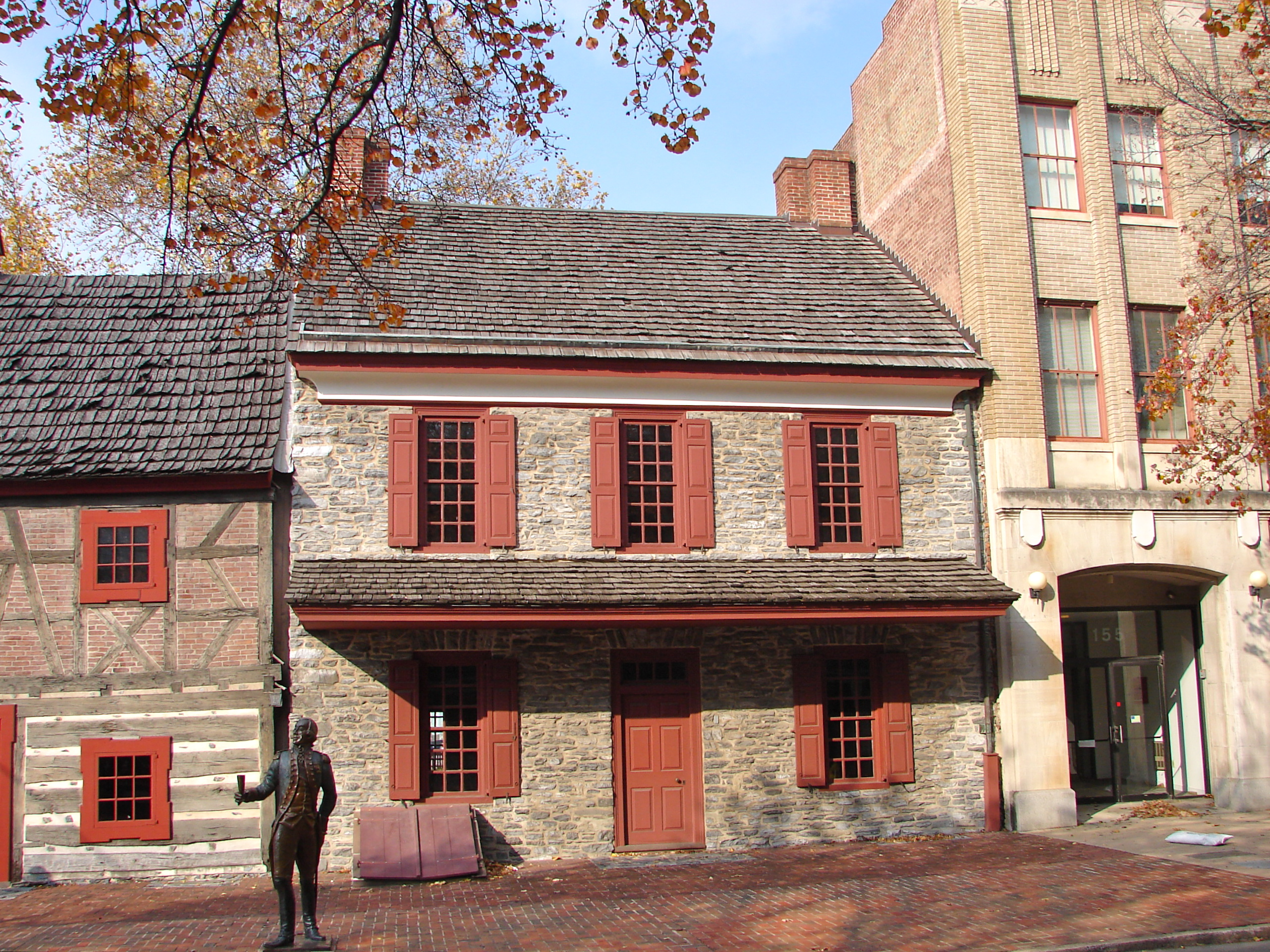
Gen. Gates House, November 2010

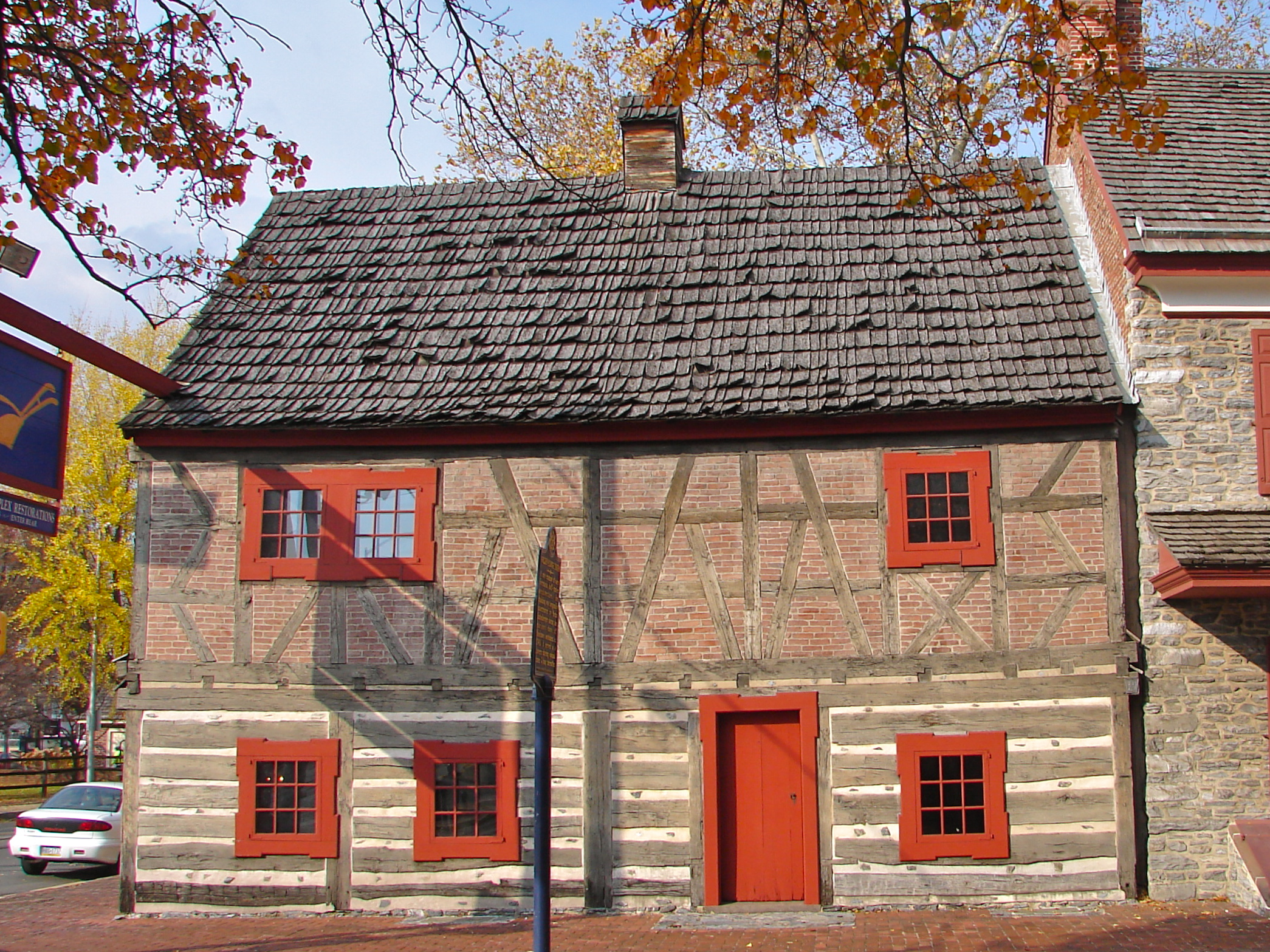
Golden Plough Tavern, November 2010

== See also ==
- Conway Cabal
- National Register of Historic Places listings in York County, Pennsylvania
