= Bill's Old Bike Barn =

Motorcycle and Americana museum

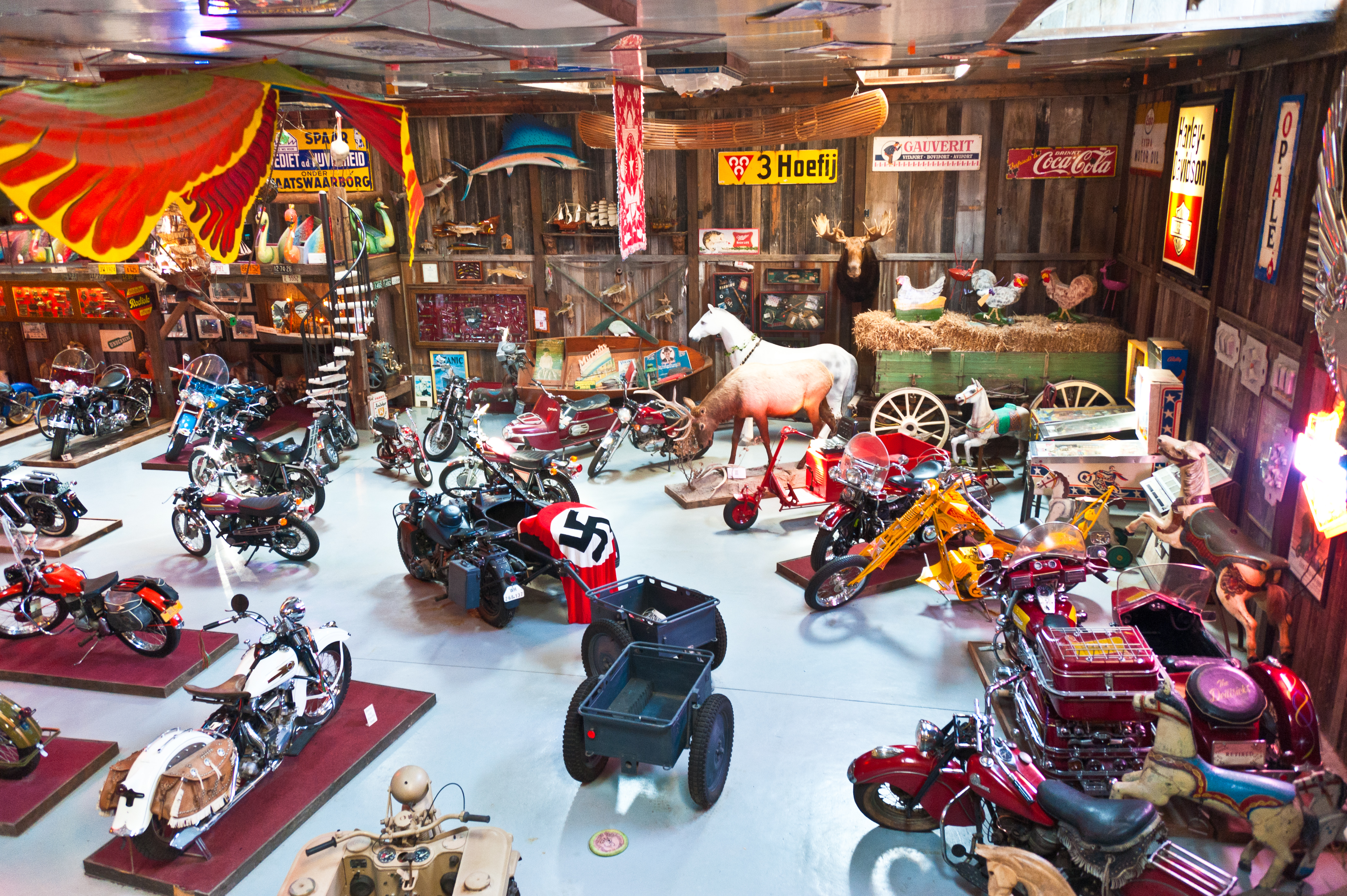
- Main room, 2011

- Location within Pennsylvania
- Established: 1999
- Location: 7145 Columbia Blvd, Bloomsburg, Pennsylvania, US
- Coordinates: 41.0396°N 76.3198°W
- Owner: William Morris
- Parking: On site (no charge)
- Website: www.billsbikebarn.com

Bill's Old Bike Barn and Museum is a motorcycle and Americana museum in Bloomsburg, Pennsylvania. William Morris opened it in 1998 to house nearly 200 vintage motorcycles and related memorabilia. The original museum was an outgrowth of his business at nearby Bill's Custom Cycles. The collection has since expanded with an eclectic selection of vintage items.

== History ==
William Morris worked for a Harley-Davidson dealer before opening Bill's Custom Cycles in 1970, off Interstate 80 on the outskirts of Bloomsburg. The shop focused on parts for the growing market in Harley-Davidson custom motorcycles. He bought up the entire stock of dealerships going out of business during Harley-Davidson's slump and expanded into mail orders, saving the collectible bikes and parts. Morris' first collectible bike, a single-cylinder Harley from 1928, was purchased for about $20. After the brand's resurgence in the mid-1980s, Morris profited from selling new old stock.

The initial collection was on display at Bill's Custom Cycles, accumulating enough Harley-Davidson signage that the company's legal department demanded Morris remove them; space concerns and this dispute stimulated the idea of a separate museum, which opened with one room in 1998. Morris, Judi Laubach and friends purchased four 19th-century barns from the Bloomsburg area and reassembled them inside a metal prefabricated building on the hill behind the shop. Baltzer J. Pisak of Hazleton, the first dealer Morris bought out in 1970, restored many of the bikes and created the first displays. Business connections in Europe encouraged Morris to expand his collection with items from there. With the addition of "Billville", an indoor street lined with replica storefronts, the museum covers over 50,000 square feet (4,600 m^{2}).

== Collection ==
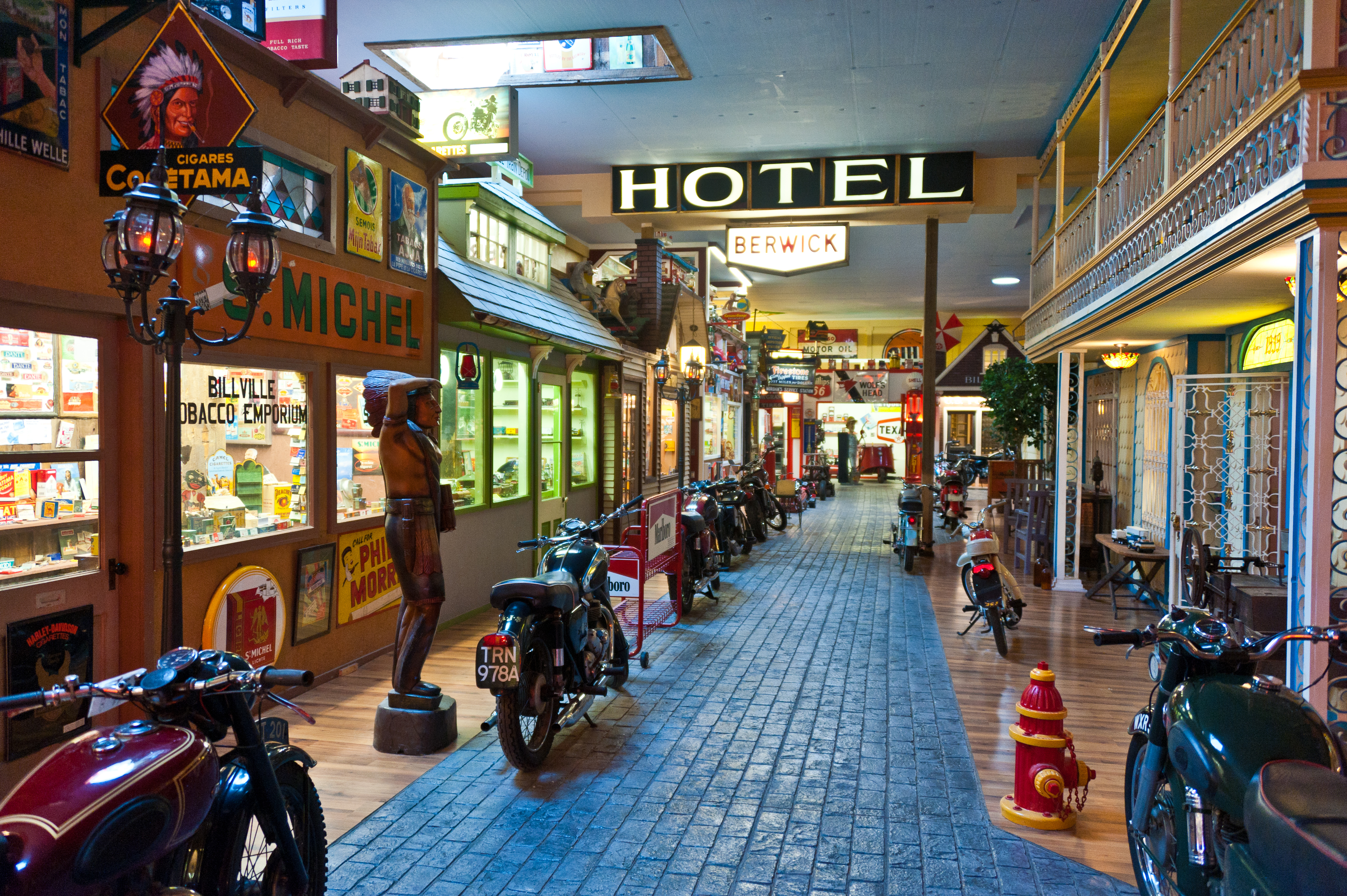
Entrance to Billville, 2011

The collection of nearly 200 antique motorcycles is notable for old bikes such as a 1909 Peugeot and 1913 Harley-Davidson Silent Grey Fellow, as well as unusual specimens such as a World War II Kettenkrad, 1961 Moto Guzzi motorcycle dump truck and a Harley-Davidson snowmobile. The displays incorporate motorcycle and military memorabilia.

However, Bike Barn has been called "as much a chronicle of iconic Americana as it is a motorcycle museum", and "a tremendous display of bikes, collectibles, and other stuff that just caught their fancy". Among others Billville features a complete barbershop and shoe shop purchased from their proprietors and a replica bar, fire station and tobacco shop. Miscellaneous collections include 1939 World's Fair and Elvis Presley memorabilia as well as toys, cameras and telephones.
