= Barnett Bobb House =

Historic house in Pennsylvania, United States

- U.S. National Register of Historic Places
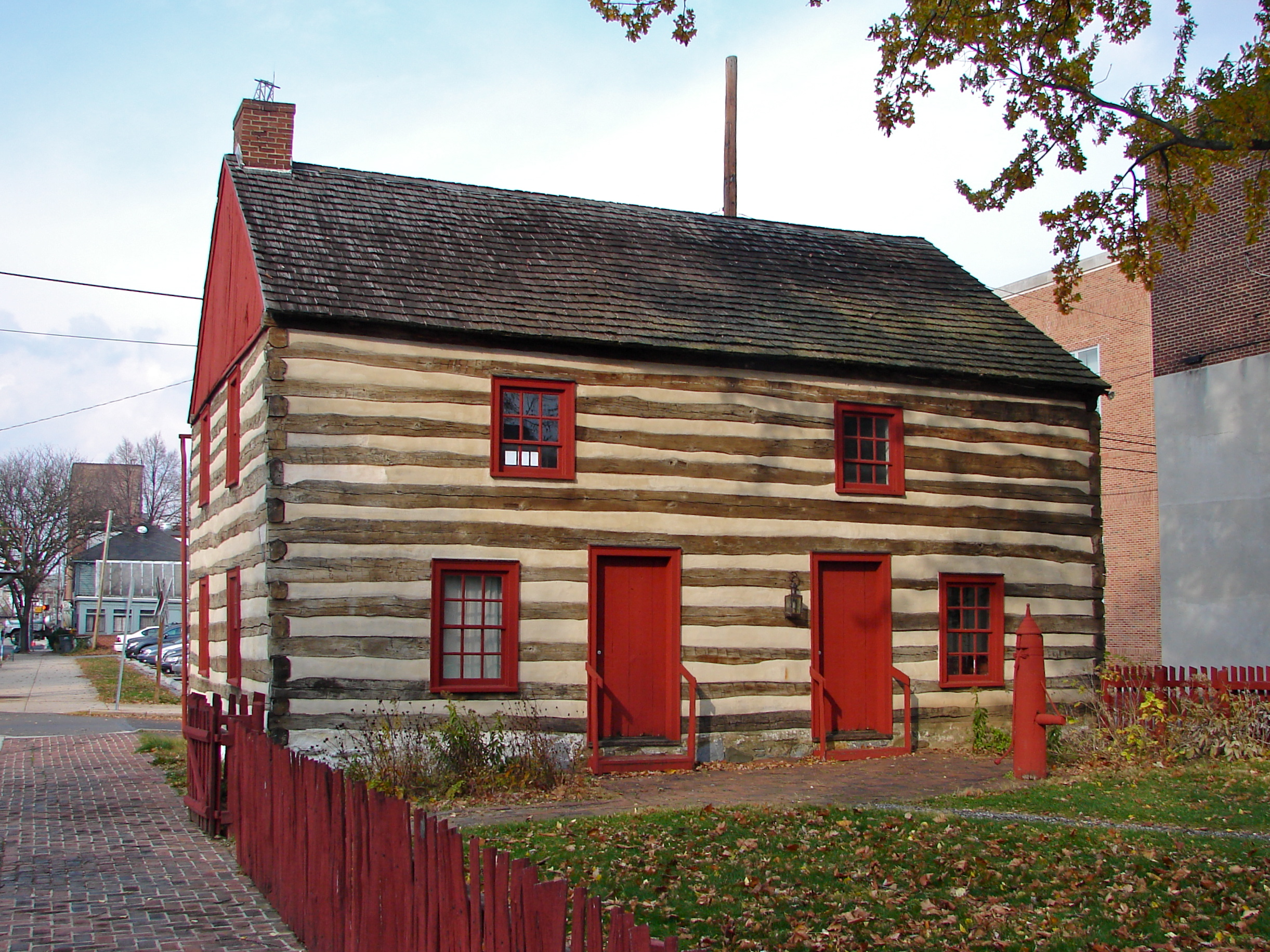
- Barnett Bobb House, November 2010

- Location within Pennsylvania Location within the United States
- Location: Rear of 157 West Market St., York, Pennsylvania
- Coordinates: 39°57′43″N 76°43′54″W
- Area: 0.1 acres (0.040 ha)
- Built: 1811
- Built by: Barnett, Bobb
- NRHP reference No.: 75001682
- Added to NRHP: October 29, 1975

The Barnett Bobb House, also known as the Old Log House, is a historic building in downtown York, Pennsylvania, York County, Pennsylvania. It was originally located at the intersection of Pershing and College Avenues. In 1968, it was moved to its current location and restored. It is on the same site as the General Horatio Gates House and Golden Plough Tavern. It was built in 1811, and is a two-story log dwelling with dovetailed corners. It houses a museum operated by the York County Heritage Trust that showcases family life during the 1830s.

It was added to the National Register of Historic Places in 1975.

== See also ==
- National Register of Historic Places listings in York County, Pennsylvania
