= Madigan Library =

Coordinates: 41°14′03.6″N 77°01′19.4″W

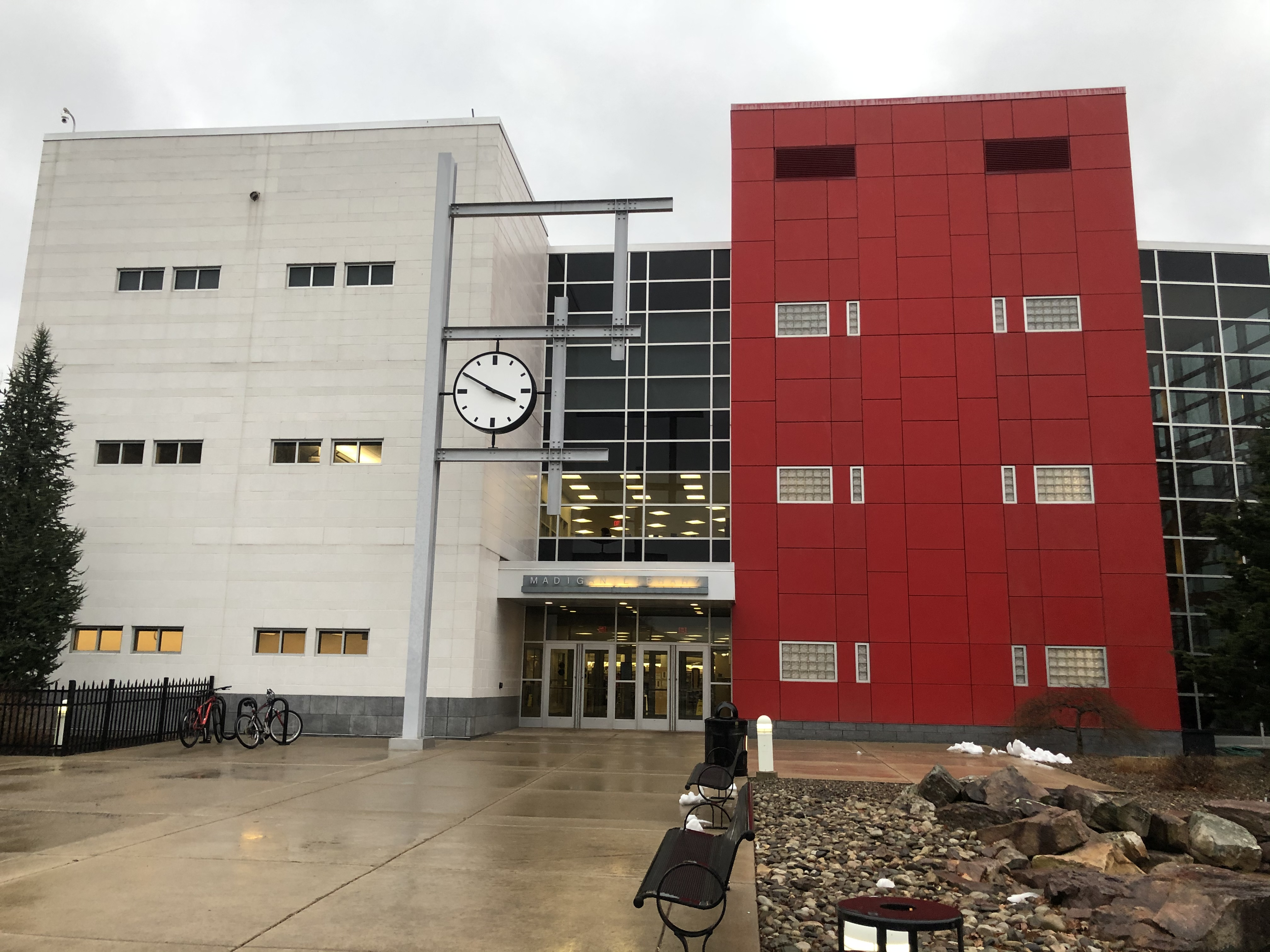
- Interactive map of the Madigan Library area

General information
- Location: Williamsport, Pennsylvania, United States
- Construction started: January 24, 2005
- Opened: September 12, 2006
- Cost: $13.8 million
- Owner: Pennsylvania College of Technology

Technical details
- Floor count: 4
- Floor area: 104,800 sq. feet

Design and construction
- Architect: Murray Associates Architects

The Madigan Library (officially The Roger and Peggy Madigan Library) is a library on campus of the Pennsylvania College of Technology in Williamsport, Pennsylvania.

== History ==
Prior to Madigan was the John T. Shuman Library which was dedicated in September 1994. The John T. Shuman Library occupied space on the first and second floors of the Learning Resources Center in the Lifelong Education Center. The Children's Learning Center is located in the area that was the former library. Groundbreaking on the new Library occurred late 2004. Construction began on January 24, 2005.

On September 12, 2006 the Library was officially opened.

== Building features ==
The library hosts seating for over one thousand guests, fourteen private study lounges, three conference rooms, three classrooms, two computer labs and dozens of divided study desks with dual monitor computers. It is also home to the Bookmarks Cafe, local archives and special collections, a virtual reality studio and an esports lab. On the third floor is the college's Center for Career Design, offices of the College Relations department, and the Gallery at Penn College.

== Collection ==
The Madigan Library holds a collection of over 400,000 volumes, this includes 25,000 reference volumes and 70,000 volumes in the law collection.

== Awards ==
- 2011 Outstanding Design Interiors Showcase American School And University by American Institute of Architects
- 2011 Outstanding Design Architectural Portfolio American School And University by American Institute of Architects
