= Heritage Discovery Center =

Community history and culture center in Johnstown, Pennsylvania

- Established: 2001
- Location: 201 Sixth Avenue; Johnstown, Pennsylvania
- Coordinates: 40.340°N 78.9311°W
- Type: Artifacts and Local History
- Owner: Heritage Johnstown
- Website: Official website

The Heritage Discovery Center, officially known as the "Frank & Sylvia Pasquerilla Heritage Discovery Center", is a community history and culture center operated by Heritage Johnstown (formerly called the Johnstown Area Heritage Association) in Johnstown, Pennsylvania. The Center features permanent and changing exhibits and galleries focusing on local history and culture. The building also features the Johnstown Children's Museum, a cafe and a social club.

Admission to the Center includes entry to all the exhibits and the Johnstown Children's Museum, and also includes one visit to all Heritage Johnstown owned museums in the Johnstown Discovery Network, including the Johnstown Flood Museum, and the Wagner–Ritter House & Garden, which is open seasonally.

== Exhibits ==
"America: Through Immigrant Eyes" is a permanent exhibit about area immigrants who arrived between 1880 through 1914, mostly from Eastern and Southern Europe, and the ethnic neighborhoods in which they settled. The multimedia displays use sight, sound and smell to enable visitors to experience one person's daily life, starting from their country of origin and culture, to their travel to the United States to their lives and impact in the Johnstown area. A theatre features video interviews with the children and grandchildren of Johnstown immigrants.

The "Iron & Steel Gallery" focuses on the area steel industry. Exhibits include photographs and multi-media presentations.

The Heritage Discovery Center also features two galleries for changing exhibits of local history and culture.

== Johnstown Children's Museum ==
The Johnstown Children's Museum is located on the Center's third floor. Interactive displays enable young children to learn Johnstown's geography, history, culture and industry through play.

== History ==
The building was built in 1907 as a large brewery for the Germania Brewery Company, a local Johnstown brewery. In 2008-2009, Phase II of the building's development was completed which included the renovations of the third, fourth and fifth floors, and the opening of the Johnstown Children's Museum, the Ethnic Social Club, Galliker's Cafe, and Iron & Steel Gallery.
