= Wagner–Ritter House & Garden =

Coordinates: 40.33971°N 78.92888°W

Wagner-Ritter House
- Established: 2006
- Location: 418 Broad St. Johnstown, Pennsylvania, U.S.
- Type: Historic house museum
- Owner: Heritage Johnstown
- Website: Official website

The Wagner-Ritter House & Garden, is a historic house museum and garden located in Johnstown, Pennsylvania, occupied for 130 years by three generations of a steel worker's family from the 1860s to the 1990s. This historic house museum illustrates the domestic lives of this immigrant family, interpreting the home lives of the thousands who toiled in the shadow of the Cambria Iron Company.

The Wagner-Ritter House is one of about a dozen remaining structures in the working-class neighborhood of Cambria City that survived the Johnstown Flood. The Wagner-Ritter House & Garden is restored and operated by Heritage Johnstown.

== History ==
The Wagner-Ritter House is estimated to have been built around 1865. The four room home was built by German immigrants George and Frances (née Franziska Hegele) Wagner. They had thirteen children. George Wagner worked as a laborer for the Cambria Iron Company. The oldest sons worked in the local coal mines and steel mill.

On May 31, 1889, the Wagners, then a family of nine, were in the home when the Johnstown Flood struck. As the family huddled on the second floor, they were able to drag a woman out the floodwater to safety through a window. The water rose thirteen feet, but the home survived.

== Museum ==
In the 1990s, Robert and Eugene Ritter donated the home to Heritage Johnstown (then called the Johnstown Area Heritage Association). Heritage Johnstown invested $750,000 in restoring the historic house and garden. An archaeological dig unearthed 28,000 artifacts, including thousands of glass shards from George A. Wagner Jr. and Peter Wagner's soda pop bottling business. The Johnstown Garden Club planted raised bed gardens typical of a German family in the 19th century.

The Wagner-Ritter House opened its doors as a museum on May 31, 2006, at 4:07 p.m., commemorating the date and time the South Fork Dam broke.

The rooms of the house display appliances and furnishings of the 1800s as well as a 19th-century German raised bed garden. The yard contains a barn, privy, and a bake oven shelter that have been recreated based on historical and archeological evidence.

Heritage Johnstown also operates the Johnstown Flood Museum and the Heritage Discovery Center, which includes the Johnstown Children's Museum.
