= Wyeth House =

Wyeth House may refer to:

- John Wyeth House, in Cambridge, Massachusetts
- Wyeth Brickyard Superintendent's House, in Cambridge, Massachusetts
- Wyeth-Smith House, in Cambridge, Massachusetts
- Peter and Henriette Wyeth Hurd House, in San Patricio, New Mexico
- Dr. Jacob Geiger House-Maud Wyeth Painter House, in St. Joseph, Missouri
- N. C. Wyeth House and Studio, in Chadds Ford Township, Pennsylvania

== See also ==
- Wyeth Flats
- Wyeth (disambiguation)
