= Peter and Henriette Wyeth Hurd House =

- U.S. National Register of Historic Places
- U.S. National Historic Landmark
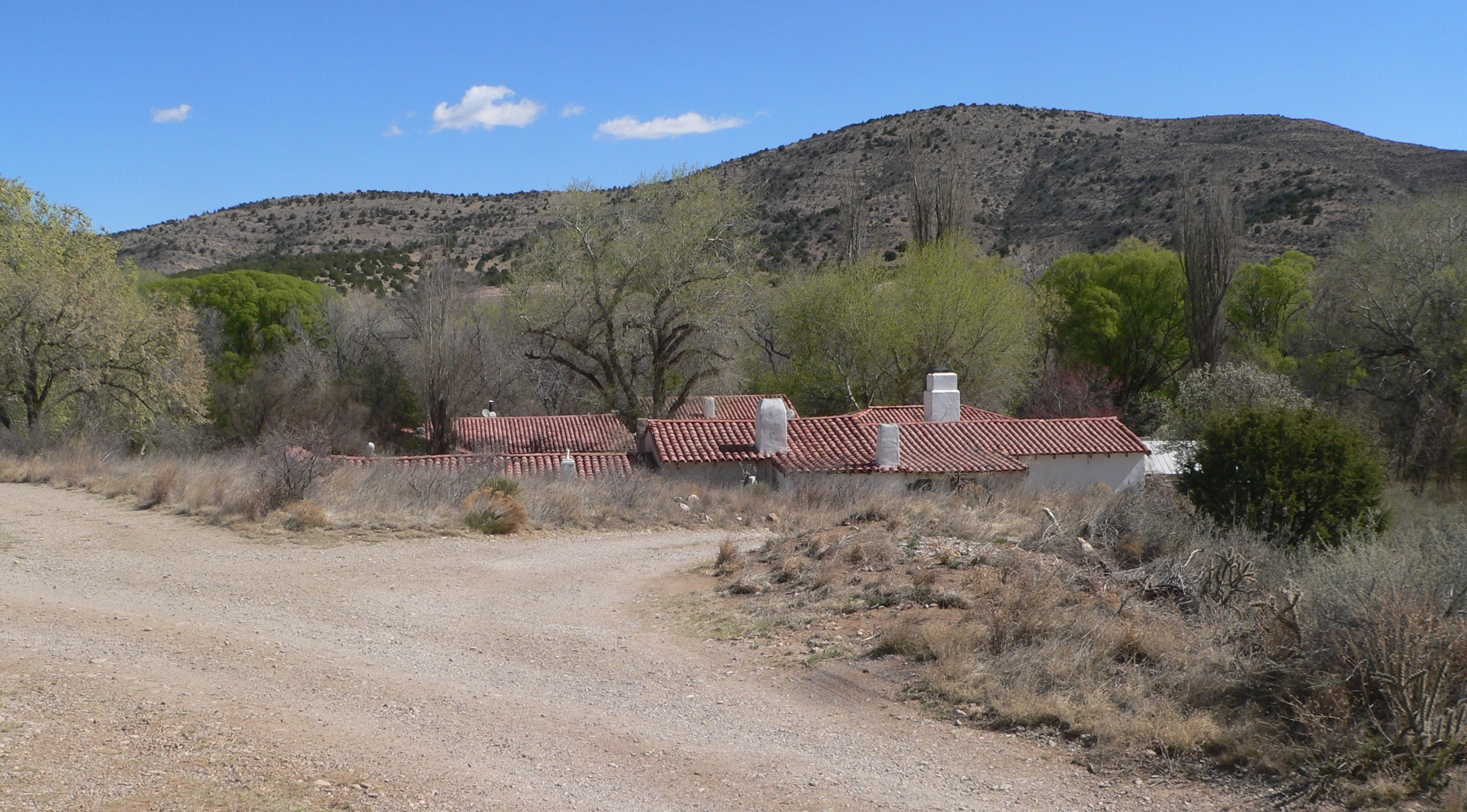

- Location within New Mexico
- Location: 129 La Mancha Ln., San Patricio, New Mexico
- Coordinates: 33°24′13″N 105°19′47″W
- Area: 40 acres (16 ha)
- NRHP reference No.: 14001015 (NRHP nomination); 100011368 (NHL designation)

Significant dates
- Added to NRHP: December 10, 2014
- Designated NHL: December 13, 2024

The Peter and Henriette Wyeth Hurd House is a historic house at 129 La Mancha Lane in San Patricio, New Mexico. It was listed on the National Register of Historic Places in 2014, and was designated a National Historic Landmark in 2024.

The property is the house and studios of artists Peter Hurd (1904-1984) and Henriette Wyeth Hurd (1907-1997), who lived and painted here from the 1930s until their deaths. It has a placita, or open courtyard, in the style of historic ranchos in New Mexico.
