= Nathaniel Wyeth =

Nathaniel Wyeth may refer to:

- Nathaniel Wyeth (inventor) (1911–1990), inventor of the recyclable PET plastic bottle
- Nathaniel Jarvis Wyeth (1802–1856), developer of the US ice industry
