= Jamie Wyeth =

American painter (born 1946)

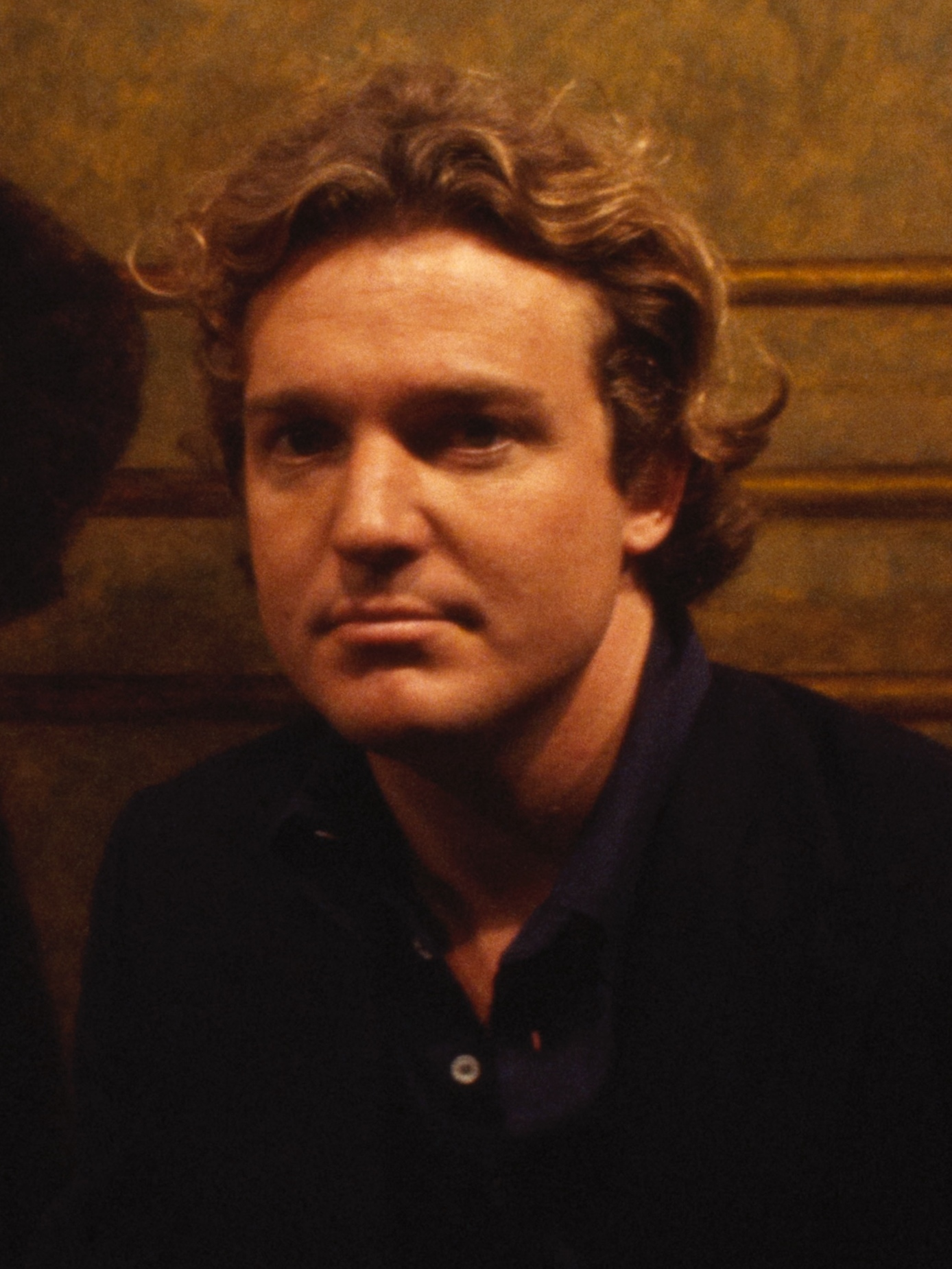
- Wyeth c. 1977
- Born: James Browning Wyeth; July 6, 1946 (age 80); Wilmington, Delaware, US
- Education: Home-schooled
- Known for: Painting
- Notable work: Portrait of John F. Kennedy; Portrait of Andy Warhol
- Movement: American realism
- Elected: National Academy of Design

James Browning Wyeth (born July 6, 1946) is an American realist painter, son of Andrew Wyeth, and grandson of N.C. Wyeth. He was raised in Chadds Ford Township, Pennsylvania, and is artistic heir to the Brandywine School tradition — painters who worked in the rural Brandywine River area of Delaware and Pennsylvania, portraying its people, animals, and landscape.

== Biography ==
=== Early life ===
James Wyeth is the second child of Andrew and Betsy Wyeth, born three years after brother Nicholas, his only sibling. He was raised on his parents' farm "The Mill" in Chadds Ford, Pennsylvania, in much the same way as his father had been brought up, and with much the same influences. He demonstrated the same remarkable skills in drawing as his father had done at comparable ages. He attended public school for six years and then, at his request was privately tutored at home, so he could concentrate on art. His brother Nicholas would later become an art dealer.

=== Artistic study ===
At age 12, Jamie studied with his aunt Carolyn Wyeth, a well-known artist in her own right, and the resident at that time of the N. C. Wyeth House and Studio, filled with the art work and props of his grandfather. In the morning he studied English and history at his home, and in the afternoon joined other students at the studio, learning fundamentals of drawing and composition. He stated later, "She was very restrictive. It wasn't interesting, but it was important." Through his aunt, Jamie developed an interest in working with oil painting, a medium he enjoyed at a sensory level: the look, smell and feel of it. Carolyn Wyeth and Howard Pyle were his greatest early influences in developing his technique in working with oil paint. While Jamie's work in watercolor was similar to his father's, his colors were more vivid.

As a boy, Jamie was exposed to art in many ways: the works of his talented family members, art books, attendance at exhibitions, meeting with collectors, and becoming acquainted with art historians. He also developed an offbeat sense of humor, sometimes veering to the macabre.

For at least three years in the early 1960s, when Wyeth was in his middle to late teens, Wyeth painted with his father. Of their close relationship, Wyeth has said: "Quite simply, Andrew Wyeth is my closest friend – and the painter whose work I most admire. The father/son relationship goes out the window when we talk about one another's work. We are completely frank — as we have nothing to gain by being nice." At age 19 [about 1965] he traveled to New York City, to better study the artistic resources of the city and to learn human anatomy by visiting the city morgue.

=== Marriage ===
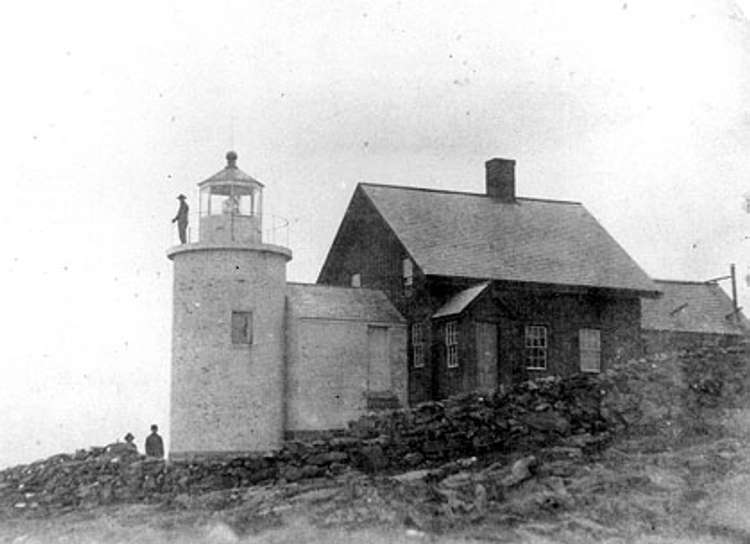
Tenants Harbor Lighthouse, Maine prior to construction of a new house and reconstruction of the tower

In 1968, Wyeth married Phyllis Mills, daughter of Alice du Pont Mills and James P. Mills and one of his models. He did not produce any children during his marriage.

Though she had been permanently disabled in a car accident and used crutches (and later a motorized chair) to get around, Wyeth found her to be a strong, determined woman whose elusive nature meant that he continually discovered something new about her. Mills is the subject of many of his paintings (which usually depict her seated) including And Then into the Deep Gorge (1975), Wicker (1979), and Whale (1978), as well as, by implication, his painting of Phyllis’ hat in Wolfbane (1984).

Phyllis had worked for John F. Kennedy when he was a senator and president. She served on several boards, including "the National Committee for Arts for the Handicapped (aka VSA (Kennedy Center)), the National Trust for Historic Preservation and the Natural Resources Defense Council. A steeplechase rider when young, she later took over her parents' thoroughbred horse racing and breeding interests, winning the 2012 Belmont Stakes with Union Rags. She died January 14, 2019 at their home in Chadds Ford, Pennsylvania.

=== Homes ===
In the 1960s Jamie purchased the Lobster Cove property on Monhegan Island in Maine, which had previously been owned by Rockwell Kent. Jamie painted many of the local people on Monhegan Island.

He has a home at Chadds Ford, Pennsylvania on the Brandywine River. In the 1990s his parents, Betsy and Andrew Wyeth, sold Jamie the Tenants Harbor Light on Southern Island in Maine that they had owned since 1978. It provides him the solitude and subject matter he most enjoys for his work. Most of his painting is done at Tenants Harbor; the rest is done at Chadds Ford.

== Style and technique ==
External videos
- Jamie Wyeth Paints "Inferno" - See the Artist's Process, Museum of Fine Arts, Boston, July 2014, 8:13
- An Interview with Jamie Wyeth, Museum of Fine Arts, Boston, July 2014, 5:18

Early on, Wyeth became interested in oil painting, his grandfather's primary medium, although he is also adept in watercolor and tempera, his father's preferred media. In describing his aunt's way of thickly applying oil paint to her palette, he stated, "I could eat it. Tempera never looked particularly edible. You have to love a medium to work in it. I love the feel and smell of oil."

In addition to studying his aunt's oil technique, he also admired his father's and grandfather's work, and that of Howard Pyle, his grandfather's teacher, as well as American masters Winslow Homer and Thomas Eakins. What inspired Wyeth most was not the subject matter or technique of his grandfather, but his "sense of total personal involvement with and intuitive grasp of his subjects". Jamie Wyeth adopted a wider palette of colors than his father's, which was closer to his aunt's and grandfather's color choices.

Wyeth's artistic reach is broader than his father's and grandfather's. He excels in drawing, lithography, etching, egg tempera, watercolor, and mixed media. Though grounded in this family's artist tradition and subjects, and bound by the same solitude of his art, his wider travels and experiences have shaped a more rounded artist. In travels to Europe, he studied the Flemish and Dutch masters, and learned the intricate and exacting process of lithography, producing a substantial amount of graphic work.

On portrait painting, Wyeth said, "To me, a portrait is not so much the actual painting, but just spending the time with the person, traveling with him, watching him eat, watching him sleep. When I work on a portrait, it's really osmosis. I try to become the person I'm painting. A successful portrait isn't about the sitter's physical characteristics — his nose, eyeballs and whatnot — but more the mood and the overall effect. I try not to impose anything of mine on him. I try to get to the point where if the sitter painted, he'd paint a portrait just the way I'm doing it."

Like his aunt Carolyn, Wyeth enjoys painting domestic animals, such as chickens, dogs, pigs, and horses. He pays particular attention to the texture of the animal's fur or feathers, the glossiness of its eye, the grass around its feet. To create the desired effects, he uses brushstrokes for texture and varnish for sheen. Wild birds that appear frequently in his work are the common seagull and the raven, the first of which also features in his Seven Deadly Sins series. Pumpkins also have appeared in several paintings, often carved into jack-o-lanterns as if for Halloween. Other repeated subjects include tree trunks, and their exposed tangled roots, or tree stumps.

Since the 1970s, Wyeth has often painted on corrugated cardboard, liking the rough striated effect cardboard gives his paintings using an archival variant as a substrate. Wyeth has also depicted cardboard itself in conventional canvas paintings, such as the painting 10W30 (1981), depicting a pair of chickens nesting in a discarded carton that once had held 10W30 grade engine oil. He also uses thick, opaque watercolor pigments, straight from the tube, creating effects similar to oil paints.

To minimize interruptions while painting outdoors, Wyeth paints from a weathered fish bait box.

== Works ==
=== Early ===
With frank and friendly advice from his father, Wyeth quickly developed his technique and style. In 1963, at the age of 17, he painted Portrait of Shorty, a bravura minutely detailed portrait of a local railroad worker. Shorty was a man who lived for 20 years in Chadds Ford, in a humble hut, speaking only with a local store owner. The composition of an unshaven Shorty against an elegant wing chair is unexpected. Joyce Hill Stoner, art historian and paintings conservator, found it has the "exactitude characteristic of sixteenth-century German oil technique".

Lincoln Kirstein, a family friend of the Wyeth family, was the subject of his first major portrait of a prominent person, titled appropriately, Portrait of Lincoln Kirstein. Kirstein was impressed by the portrait, and declared Wyeth the finest American portrait painter since John Singer Sargent. Kerstein's quote made it into the catalog for his first one-man exhibition, at the Knoedler Gallery in New York in 1966. Landscapes and portraits of people from the Chadds Ford area were presented at the exhibit.

=== "Eyewitness to Space" ===
From 1966 to 1971, Wyeth served in the Delaware Air National Guard. Although at one point he was scheduled for immediate deployment to the Vietnam War, flights were cancelled for noncombatants. During that period, he painted Adam and Eve and the C-97 (1969), depicting the Biblical couple astonished by a Boeing C-97 Stratofreighter cargo plane flying overhead. The painting was executed using military-standard oil paint on a piece of parachute cloth measuring 10 by 30 feet (3.0 by 9.1 m).

His assignment changed when he was granted top security clearance and took part in "Eyewitness to Space", a program jointly sponsored by NASA and the National Gallery of Art in Washington, D.C., to depict the activities of the Apollo Moon mission through an artist's perspective. A total of 47 artists were involved in the "Eyewitness to Space" program, including Robert Rauschenberg, Lamar Dodd, Norman Rockwell, and Morris Graves. Participants met astronauts at launch sites, such as Cape Kennedy, or rode helicopters to observe the pickup of astronauts. Of the works developed, the National Gallery of Arts chose 70 paintings, sculptures, and drawings for "The Artist and Space" exhibit that ran from December 1969 to early January 1970.

=== Political portraits and works ===
- Draft Age (1965), made during the Vietnam War, portrays a friend as a rebellious, proud young man who might be required to serve his country to protect values that he may question. Made in oil, the picture shows mastery of the subject, message and medium beyond the artist's 19 years.
- Through his acquaintance with the Kennedy family, Wyeth was commissioned to do a posthumous unofficial Portrait of John F. Kennedy (1967), with the understanding that he would keep it if it was not accepted by the surviving family. Both brothers Robert F. Kennedy and Ted Kennedy posed for Wyeth, and he studied photographs and films of the deceased president for three weeks. He attempted to portray JFK early in his presidency, perhaps in a moment of doubt or indecision over the Bay of Pigs Invasion, with the burden of power weighing on him. Jackie Kennedy thought the portrait accurate, but RFK and other family members did not like the less-than-triumphal depiction. The painting did not hang in the White House, and after stays at the French embassy in Paris, France and Trinity College in Dublin, Ireland, it was on loan from the artist to The Vice-President's Residence Foundation in Washington, D.C. Through great public acceptance, it has become one of the most famous images of JFK, including use on a 1988 postage stamp issued in Ireland. In 2014, the artist gave the portrait as a partial gift and partial purchase to the Museum of Fine Arts, Boston.
- Harper's Magazine engaged Wyeth as a court artist for the Watergate hearings and trials that included US Senate and the Supreme Court proceedings regarding the impeachment of President Richard Nixon, including the tense courtroom scenes in Judge John J. Sirica's trial of John Ehrlichman, G. Gordon Liddy, and other Watergate defendants.
- In New York during the 1970s, Wyeth painted president-elect Jimmy Carter.
- In 1984 he painted Night Vision to commemorate the Vietnam Veterans Memorial. This piece depicts a soldier of the Vietnam era as though seen through a Starlight scope or similar night vision device. It was later reproduced as a signed limited edition and sold to benefit the Vietnam Veteran's Memorial, colloquially known as "The Wall".

=== Main body of work ===
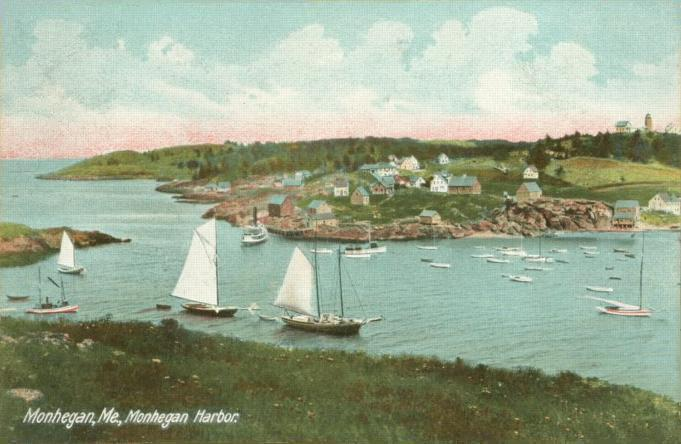
Monhegan Harbor, Monhegan, Maine (1909)

- Portrait of Andrew Wyeth (1969) depicts his father with a sober expression. His eyes, something Wyeth focuses on to indicate character, are determined and focused. The ruddy face of his father, and the large buttons of his naval coat, with all else in black, suggest that the subject had just arrived home fresh from a brisk walk by the sea.
- In New York during the 1970s, Wyeth painted Andy Warhol, Rudolf Nureyev and Arnold Schwarzenegger. Wyeth and Andy Warhol exchanged portraits of each other. A 1976 show featuring the portraits, at the Coe Kerr Gallery in New York, has been credited with reviving the popularity of the genre, after a period of being eclipsed by Abstract Expressionism. Curator Wendy Wick Reaves has said of the pair: "They were considered polar opposites. Andy was called the Patriarch of Pop, and Jamie was called Prince of Realism. ... Both had become enormously famous but also had endured extraordinary critical censure for the way their art was done. And they had a lot of interests in common: They collected Americana; they were interested in death and morbidity. They really got along splendidly." In Portrait of Andy Warhol (1976), Warhol seems to be "caught off guard without his personal persona". Nureyev's portrait reflects an intense man. Wyeth was fascinated by Nureyev, and found him to have an animal-like presence and strength that is captured in the portrait.
- Apart from visits to New York, his primary subjects in the 1970s and 1980s were the people, animals, and landscapes of his Pennsylvania home and of Monhegan island in Maine.
- Some of Wyeth's most famous animal portraits are: Portrait of a Pig (1970), Angus (1974), Islander (1975), and 10W30 (1981). Wyeth knows the animals that he paints and the work grows out of their kinship. When painting animals Wyeth changes the textures of the paint to reflect fur, wool, or feathers.
- Wyeth's self-portrait Pumpkinhead — Self-Portrait (1972), depicting a figure in black standing in a field with a pumpkin over his head, is as self-effacing as his father's self-portrait Trodden Weed (1951), showing only Andrew's legs from the knees down. Jamie Wyeth submitted it to the National Academy of Design as a required response to his invitation to join, but it was rejected. He then submitted a half-length nude self-portrait against a dark background, securing his membership at the young age of 23.
- Kleberg (1984), portrays a yellow Labrador Retriever adorned with a comical black ring drawn around one eye, sitting next to a traditional skep beehive. The painting captures Wyeth's love of animals, but also reflects some of Wyeth's favorite books, visible on a bookshelf in the background. Titles of books indicate the close connection to his family: Treasure Island, illustrated by his grandfather, N. C. Wyeth; Christina's World made by his father; and The Stray, written by his mother, Betsy Wyeth and illustrated by Jamie Wyeth. Other individuals who earned his respect are represented: Howard Pyle in Pyle's Book of Pirates, Lincoln Kirstein's Lay This Laurel, and a biography of John F. Kennedy. Favored books include The Magus by John Fowles, The Wanderer by Alain-Fournier and the 1908 children's book The Wind in the Willows.
- Much of his output since 1990 was created at Tenants Harbor. Wyeth's fascination with island life is revealed in its more disturbing form in If Once You Have Slept on an Island (1996) which depicts a young woman sitting on a tousled bed who appears sad and exhausted from wild dreams. The title was derived from a poem by Rachel Field with the opening lines:
  If once you have slept on an island,
  You'll never be quite the same.
- Screen Door to the Sea, painted in 1994, is also representative of this era. This painting features a teenage islander who Wyeth painted a number of times, named Orca Bates. On painting him, Wyeth has said, "I see a distinct islandness with islanders, a certain edge. Am I putting that into them? I don't care, as long as something comes out of it." This painting is representative of an "elusive form of realism", typical of later works by Wyeth. Though grounded in portraiture, the painting's details suggest a narrative.
- In 2002, Wyeth followed up with another humorous self-portrait Pumpkinhead Visits the Lighthouse.
- Inferno, Monhegan (2005) depicts a semi-expressionistic chaotic scene of a young boy stuffing decaying garbage into a beachside incinerator, surrounded by a screaming flock of seagulls trying to snatch pieces of leftover food. This large 60-by-80-inch (1.5 by 2.0 m) painting was executed on corrugated cardboard with thick opaque watercolor pigments, and its completion was documented in a short film accompanying a 2014 traveling exhibition. The work is a reinterpretation of earlier paintings, such as Cat Bates of Monhegan (1995) and Harbor, Monhegan (1998), which show the same scene in a more realist style.
- A Seven Deadly Sins (c. 2005–2008) series of paintings depicts the traditional vices using expressive images of seagulls enacting each scenario. The series was inspired in part by Wyeth's memories of a parallel series done in 1945 – 1949 by New York magical realist painter Paul Cadmus.

=== Other works ===
Other noteworthy commissions in addition to Wyeth's portrait of JFK have been the design of a 1971 eight-cent Christmas stamp, the official White House Christmas cards for 1981 and 1984, and the Eunice Kennedy Shriver portrait for use on the 1995 Special Olympics World Games Commemorative silver dollar. He also lent his support to lighthouse preservation efforts in Maine in 1995 with his exhibition, "Island Light".

Wyeth has illustrated three children's books, The Stray (1979), written by his mother Betsy James Wyeth, Cabbages and Kings (1997), written by Elizabeth Seabrook, and Sammy in the Sky (2011) about the loss of a beloved dog, by Maine author Barbara Walsh.

Wyeth has also produced detailed miniature dioramas (called tableaux vivants), including two 2013 works: one portrays Andy Warhol dining with friends at The Factory, and another depicts Lincoln Kirstein and other friends dining at a New York restaurant. These works were exhibited in a 2014 retrospective show.

Three of Wyeth original paintings, Snapper, Red tailed Hawk, and With Green Pepper, were destroyed by a fire which occurred at the Maine Wyeth Art Gallery in Port Clyde, Maine in September 2023.

=== Critical reaction ===
When Wyeth had his first exhibition in New York in 1965, he received a scathing review by the New York Times. His work was compared to that of his ancestors, neither of whom were considered contenders in the commercial business of modern art. Jamie Wyeth's critics level some of the same charges as they do against his father — to some, both artists seem anachronistic, too close to illustration, and out of touch with the 20th century evolution of post-Picasso modernism. He answers, "We're charged, my father and I, with being a pack of illustrators. I've always taken it as a supreme compliment. What's wrong with illustration? There's this thing now that illustrations are sort of secondary to art and I think it's a bunch of crap."

According to the Brandywine River Museum, "James Wyeth had earned national attention with a posthumous portrait of John F. Kennedy and other work. Later, he produced striking portraits of Rudolf Nureyev and Andy Warhol, studies for which are in the museum's collection. Since then, Wyeth has established a distinctive style, characterized by strong images and sharp contrasts in his landscapes and portraits. He is known for his monumental animal portraits, including Portrait of Pig and Raven in the museum's collection, which represents various stages in his changing style."

In "Jamie Wyeth: Proteus in Paint" Joyce Hill Stoner described Wyeth's work as reflecting his connection to his artistic heritage and his ability to translate detailed observations into varied visual styles, citing Portrait and Comet as examples.

Ann Morgan, author of Oxford Dictionary of American Art and Arts, describes his style as one that follows the realistic style of his father, Andrew Wyeth, while venturing into "more psychologically fraught territory". When making portraits, Wyeth sees into the nature of an individual and portrays them with such detail and realism that the shocked subjects "often hid them up in their closets".

=== Exhibitions ===
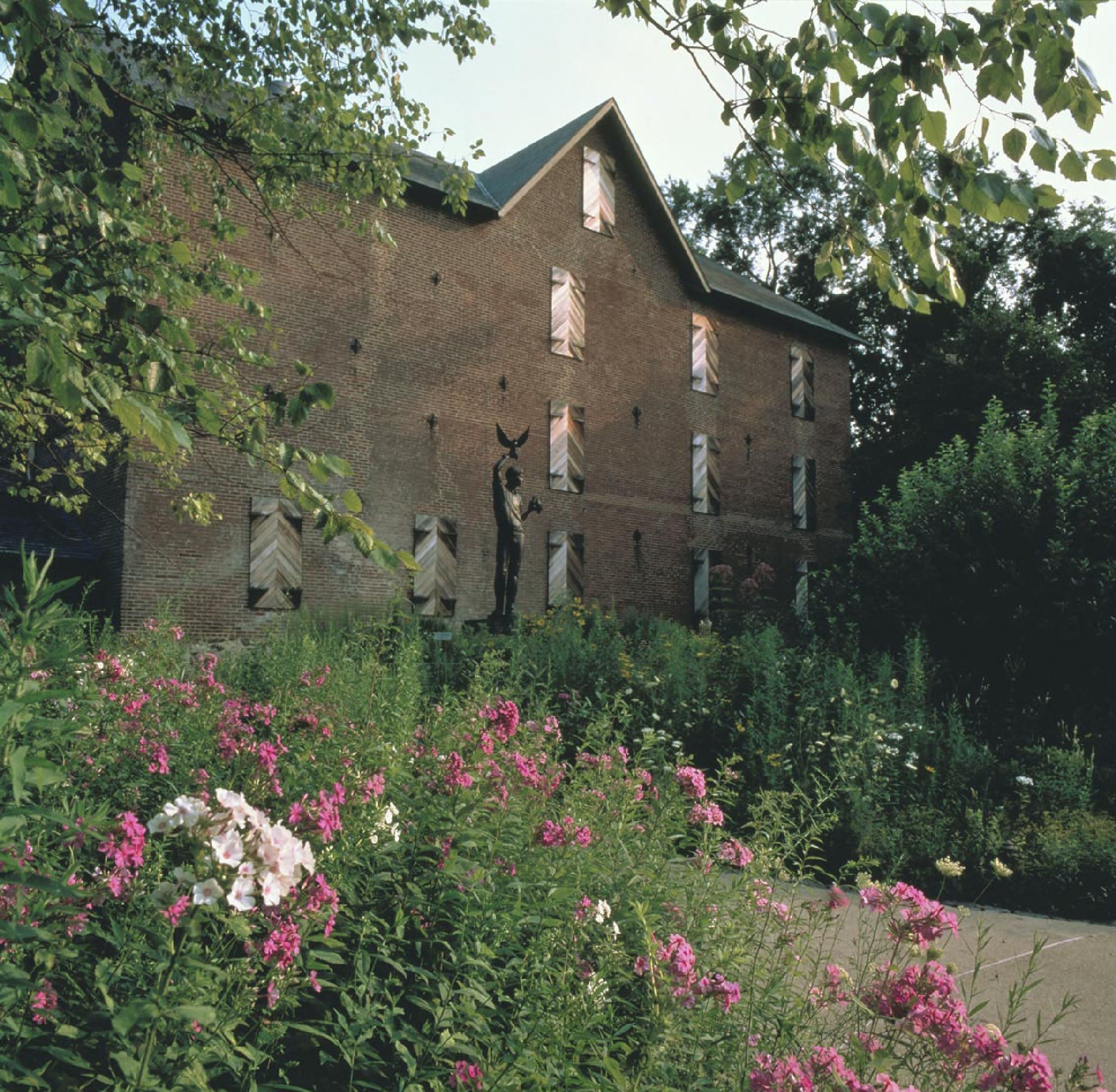
Brandywine River Museum, Chadds Ford, Pennsylvania

- Wyeth's work became more widely known after being shown alongside his father's and grandfather's art at an exhibition in 1971 at the newly opened Brandywine River Museum at Chadds Ford, the foremost repository for all the Brandywine artists. A highlight of the show was Wyeth's Portrait of Pig, a 7-by-5-foot (2.1 by 1.5 m) painting befitting its subject's size and status.
- In March 1987, Wyeth traveled to Leningrad to attend the opening of An American Vision: Three Generations of Wyeth Art, a major exhibition of 117 works whose rural subjects proved very popular with the Russian people. In an earlier visit during the summer of 1975, Wyeth had been invited to the Soviet Union to tour the country's art museums, and he had taken the opportunity to meet with dissident artists. After his 1987 trip, he expressed astonishment at the newfound artistic freedom there, and also his concerns that Mikhail Gorbachev risked a repressive backlash against his new policy of "Glasnost" (this was several years before the failed 1991 Soviet coup d'état attempt).
- Since 1990, Jamie Wyeth has been presented at dozens of exhibitions throughout the United States and abroad.
- Wyeth's works are presented at Mary Louise Cowan Gallery in Maine; exhibits have included: The Maine Influence: Selected Works by James Wyeth, and Capturing Nureyev: James Wyeth Paints the Dancer, and others.
- In 2008, Wyeth's exhibition, Seven Deadly Sins, was held at the Adelson Galleries, New York.
- Farm Work by Jamie Wyeth was a 2011 exhibit at the Brandywine River Museum.
- In 2014, the Museum of Fine Arts, Boston mounted the first major retrospective of Wyeth's work, which traveled to three other venues. Some critics gave mixed reviews, while others were more enthusiastic. The retrospective covered his entire career, from drawings made when he was two or three, to paintings and dioramas completed in 2013, and also resulted in publication of a large book-format exhibition catalog.

=== Museums and awards ===
Jamie Wyeth's works are in the collections of the Brandywine River Museum, the Farnsworth Art Museum, the Terra Museum of American Art, the National Gallery of Art, the National Portrait Gallery, the Fine Arts Museums of San Francisco, and the Museum of Fine Arts, Boston.

In 1972 Wyeth was appointed a council member of the National Endowment for the Arts. In 1975 he became a member of the board of governors of the National Space Institute. He is a member of the National Academy of Design and the American Watercolor Society. He holds many honorary degrees including from Elizabethtown College (1975), Dickinson School of Law (1983), and Pine Manor College (1987).
