= Senator Coe =

Senator Coe may refer to:

- Earl Coe (1892–1964), Washington State Senate
- George Coe (Michigan politician) (1811–1869), Michigan State Senate
- Hank Coe (born 1946), Wyoming State Senate
- Henry Waldo Coe (1857–1927), Oregon State Senate
- John D. Coe (1755–1824), New York State Senate
- John W. Coe (1839–1890), New York State Senate
- Louise Holland Coe (1894–1985), New Mexico State Senate
