= Wyeth (name) =

Wyeth is a surname. Notable people with the name include:

- N. C. Wyeth (1882–1945), American artist, or one of his family:
  - daughter Henriette Wyeth (1907–1997), artist
  - daughter Carolyn Wyeth (1909–1994), artist
  - son Nathaniel C. Wyeth (1911–1990), mechanical engineer and inventor
    - grandson Howard Wyeth (1944–1996), drummer and pianist
  - daughter Ann Wyeth McCoy (1915–2005), artist
  - son Andrew Wyeth (1917–2009), artist
    - grandson Jamie Wyeth (born 1946), artist
- Adam Wyeth (born 1978), English poet, playwright and essayist
- Alison Wyeth (born 1964), English long-distance runner
- Arthur Wyeth (1887–1971), Australian cricket umpire
- Ezra Wyeth (1910–1992), Australian cricketer
- Huston Wyeth (1863–1925), American businessman
- John Wyeth (1770–1858), American publisher
- John Allan Wyeth (1845–1922), American Confederate veteran and surgeon
- Joseph Wyeth (1663–1731), English Quaker merchant
- Joshua Wyeth (1758-1829), Blacksmith Apprentice, American Patriot, Participated in and later coined the phrase "Boston Tea Party"
- Katya Wyeth (born 1948), German-born American model and actress
- Marion Sims Wyeth (1889–1982), American architect
- Nathan C. Wyeth (1870–1963), American architect, designer of the Oval Office and West Wing
- Nathaniel Jarvis Wyeth (1802–1856), American inventor, ice harvester, explorer and trader
- Steven Wyeth, British football commentator
