= Wyeth (disambiguation) =

Wyeth was an American pharmaceutical company.

Wyeth may also refer to:

== Places ==
- Wyeth, Missouri, United States
- Wyeth, Oregon, United States
- Wyeth Heights, Antarctica

== Other ==
- Wyeth (name), including a list of people with the name
- 5090 Wyeth, main-belt asteroid

== See also ==
- Wyeth House (disambiguation)
- Wyethia, a genus of flowering plants
