= Joshua Lewis House =

Historic house in Massachusetts, United States

- U.S. National Register of Historic Places
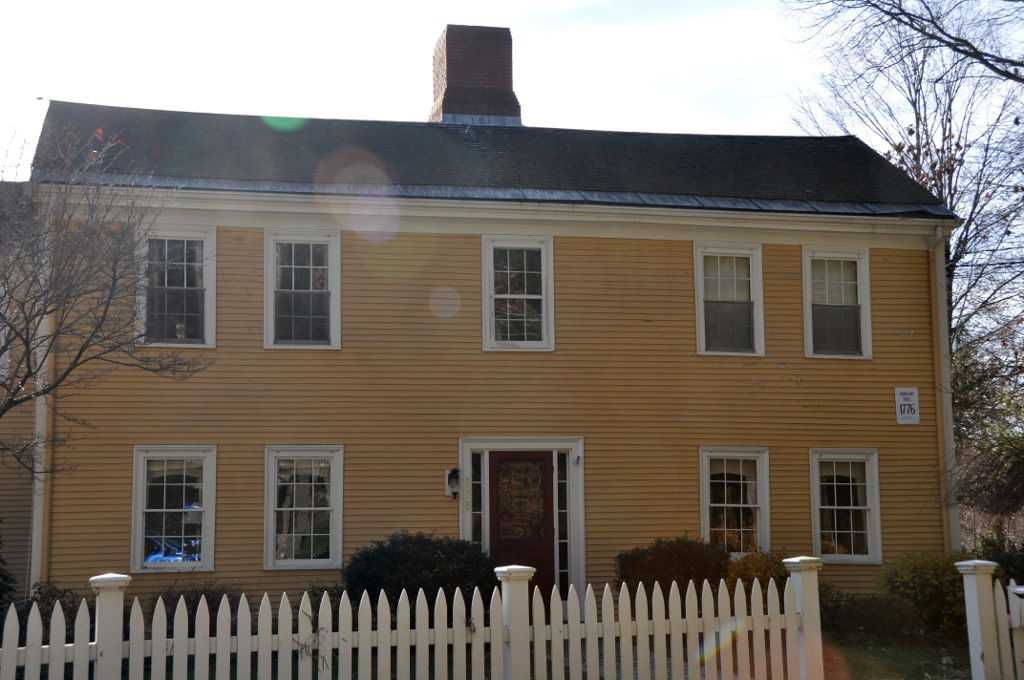

- Location within Massachusetts Location within the United States
- Location: 178 South St., Needham, Massachusetts
- Coordinates: 42°16′8″N 71°12′49″W
- Area: 1.25 acres (0.51 ha)
- Architectural style: Georgian
- NRHP reference No.: 82002749
- Added to NRHP: April 1, 1982

The Joshua Lewis House is a historic house in Needham, Massachusetts. Built in 1776, it has a well-preserved example of late Georgian architecture, which has been home to a number of individuals of local and national importance, including artist N.C. Wyeth. It was listed on the National Register of Historic Places in 1982.

== Description and history ==
The Joshua Lewis House stands in a residential area of southeastern Needham, on the south side of South Street between its junctions with Green Street and Needhamdale Road. It is set on 1.2 acres (0.49 ha) overlooking the Charles River. It is a 2 1/2-story wood-frame structure, with a side-gable roof that extends down to the first floor in the rear, giving the house a saltbox profile. Its exterior is clad in wooden siding, and it has a brick central chimney. Its main facade is five bays wide, with a center entrance flanked by sidelight windows. The interior follows a typical center-chimney plan, with a narrow entrance vestibule, parlors on either side of the chimney, and long kitchen behind the chimney. It retains original period fireplace surrounds and other woodwork. There are modern additions extending to the south and northeast.

The house was built in 1776 by Joshua Lewis, on land originally belonging to his wife's family. Little is known of the Lewises; his wife, Mary Lyons, was the daughter of a prominent local landowner. The first notable owner of the house was David Livingston, a regionally prominent woodcarver whose credits include work in the Massachusetts State House. In 1874 the house was purchased by Denys Zirngiebel, a Swiss horticulturalist who served as an early director of the Arnold Arboretum. Zirngiebel was a protégé of Louis Agassiz, and was friends with Henry Wadsworth Longfellow, who is known to have visited here. Longfellow is said to have mentioned a tree on this property in his poem "To the River Charles". Zirngiebel's daughter Henriette married Andrew Newell Wyeth, the father of artist N.C. Wyeth purchased the house in 1921, and used it as a home and studio for a number of years.

== See also ==
- National Register of Historic Places listings in Norfolk County, Massachusetts
