= Trodden Weed =

1951 painting by Andrew Wyeth

- Artist: Andrew Wyeth
- Year: 1951
- Type: Tempera on board
- Dimensions: 50.8 cm × 46.35 cm (20 in × 18 1/5 in)
- Location: Private collection

Trodden Weed is a 1951 painting by the American artist Andrew Wyeth. It is a self-portrait, displaying the painter from his knees down, dressed in a pair of old, high leather boots.

The boots had belonged to N. C. Wyeth's teacher Howard Pyle. Andrew Wyeth had received the boots as a Christmas gift from his wife in 1950. The boots fitted him and he used them as he walked around the countryside of Chadds Ford recovering from a serious operation. Wyeth described the creation of this painting in a letter published in ARTnews in May 1952.

Michael Ennis of Texas Monthly wrote in 1987: "In Trodden Weed (1951), a self-portrait from the knees down in which the artist donned Howard Pyle's wrinkled old boots, Andrew strides the coppery turf with an autobiographical symbolism that is as hackneyed as it is visually moribund".
