= Dub Williams =

American politician (1927–2014)

W. C. "Dub" Williams

Member of the New Mexico House of Representatives for the 56th district
- In office 1995–2009

Personal details
- Born: November 26, 1927 Bogalusa, Louisiana, United States
- Died: October 27, 2014 (aged 86) Glencoe, New Mexico, United States
- Party: Republican
- Spouse: Kathryn
- Children: two
- Profession: teacher, farmer, rancher

Walter Cecil "Dub" Williams, Jr. (November 26, 1927 – October 27, 2014), was an American politician who was a Republican member of the New Mexico House of Representatives from 1995 to 2009. Williams attended New Mexico State University and was a teacher, farmer and rancher. He lived in Glencoe, New Mexico. Williams died at his home in 2014 at the age of 86.
