= John Nickolls =

John Nickolls (1710?–1745) was an English collector and antiquary.

== Life ==
John Nickolls was born in Ware, Hertfordshire, in 1710 or 1711, the son of John Nickolls, a Quaker miller. He was apprenticed to Joseph Wyeth, merchant in London, and, after serving his time, became a partner with his father. Nickolls was elected a fellow of the Society of Antiquaries on 17 January 1740 and elected a Fellow of the Royal Society in 1744.

== Collector ==
Nickolls built up an extensive library at his house in Trinity parish, Queenhithe. He also collected from the bookstalls about Moorfields two thousand prints of heads; these later furnished Joseph Ames with material for his Catalogue of English Heads, London, 1748. From Wyeth's widow Nickolls received a number of letters at one time in John Milton's possession; they had since belonged to Milton's secretary, Thomas Ellwood, and had been used by Wyeth in the preparation for publication of Ellwood's Journal, which was issued in 1713. William Oldys visited Nickolls at Queenhithe on 22 December 1737, to see this collection of original letters. These documents were issued by Nickolls in 1743. Oldys says in his diary that Nickolls allowed Thomas Birch to use some of them in his life of Oliver Cromwell in the General Dictionary, Historical and Critical, 1731–41.

== Death and burial ==
Nickolls died of fever on 11 January 1745, and was buried at the Quaker Burying Ground, Bunhill Fields, five days later.

== Legacy ==
On 18 January 1746, Nickolls' father presented the original manuscripts from his collection to the Society of Antiquaries.

Nickolls' prints and rare pamphlets were purchased by John Fothergill.

== Notes ==
Attribution

This article incorporates text from a publication now in the public domain: "Nickolls, John". Dictionary of National Biography. London: Smith, Elder & Co. 1885–1900.
