= Nathaniel Wyeth (inventor) =

American inventor, mechanical engineer

Nathaniel C. Wyeth
- Born: October 24, 1911; Chadds Ford, Pennsylvania, U.S.
- Died: July 4, 1990 (aged 78); Glen Cove, Maine, U.S.
- Education: University of Pennsylvania
- Occupations: inventor, chemical engineer
- Spouses: Caroline Pyle (m. 1937; died 1973): Jean Grady
- Children: 8, including Howard Wyeth
- Parent: N. C. Wyeth

Nathaniel C. Wyeth (October 24, 1911 – July 4, 1990) was an American mechanical engineer and inventor. He is best known for creating a variant of polyethylene terephthalate that could withstand the pressure of carbonated liquids. Made of recyclable PET plastic, lighter than glass and virtually unbreakable, Wyeth's invention is used widely today for both carbonated and non-carbonated drinks.

== Early life and education ==
Born in Asgard near Chadds Ford, he displayed an engineering talent throughout his youth. Wyeth held a bachelor's degree in mechanical engineering from the University of Pennsylvania. Wyeth is also known as the brother of painters Andrew Wyeth, Carolyn Wyeth, and Henriette Wyeth Hurd, the father of musician Howard Wyeth, and as the son of artist and illustrator N. C. Wyeth.

Wyeth often called himself "the other Wyeth" because N.C. and Andrew Wyeth were so well known.

== Career ==
Nathaniel Wyeth joined DuPont in 1936 as a field engineer. By 1963 he was the company's first engineering fellow and when he retired in 1976, was DuPont's first senior engineering fellow, the company's highest technical position.

In 1967, he pondered whether soda (carbonated drinks) could be stored in plastic bottles. After experimenting with a plastic detergent bottle that proved incapable of withstanding the forces of pressurized liquids, he realized that a much stronger material would be required. He initially experimented with polypropylene, but ultimately settled on polyethylene terephthalate as the material and received the patent in 1973.

Wyeth received the 1981 Society of Plastics Engineers international award for outstanding achievement, and was inducted into the Society of the Plastics Industry Hall of Fame in 1986. He was a fellow of the American Society of Mechanical Engineers.

Wyeth was the first person named senior engineering fellow at DuPont, the company's highest technical position. Nathaniel invented or co-invented twenty-five products. In 1990, Wyeth was award DuPont's Lavoisier Award for Technical Achievement.

Wyeth's other innovations included improvements to manufacturing process, plastics, textiles, electronics and mechanical devices.

== Personal life ==
He married Caroline Pyle (Howard Pyle's niece) in 1937. Local residents were inclined to think Caroline and Wyeth's father, N. C. Wyeth, carried on a relationship, though biographer David Michaelis found little evidence to suggest it. Caroline died in 1973 and in 1984 Wyeth married Jean Grady.

Wyeth and Caroline had six sons and two daughters. Their oldest child, Katharine Pyle Wyeth, was born in 1938 but only lived a few hours. Biographer David Michaelis wrote that she was delivered during a forceps delivery and cited that as the cause of her death. Newell, their oldest son, died in 1945 alongside his grandfather, N.C. Wyeth (Wyeth's father), when their car stalled on a railroad crossing near their home and they were struck by a milk train.

== See also ==
- Wyeth
