= Louise Holland Coe =

American politician (1894-1985)

- Coe, 1930

President pro tempore of the New Mexico Senate
- In office 1929–1941

New Mexico State Senator
- In office 1925–1941
- Constituency: Lincoln County, Otero County, Socorro County, and Torrance County

Personal details
- Born: November 26, 1894 Bartlett, Texas
- Died: March 13, 1985 (aged 90) Roswell, New Mexico
- Party: Democratic
- Spouse: Wilbur Coe
- Education: University of New Mexico
- Occupation: Teacher, legislator

Louise Holland Coe (November 26, 1894 – March 13, 1985) was the first woman elected to the New Mexico Senate and its first female president pro tempore. She was elected six years after women in the United States won the right to vote, and she was also the first woman Democratic candidate for the United States Congress, running in 1940.

== Early life and teaching career ==
Louise Holland Coe was born as Louise Holland in Bartlett, Texas, on November 26, 1894. She moved to Roswell, New Mexico during her childhood.

Coe's early background and career was in public education and administration. She began teaching at rural schools. From 1916 to 1918, Coe taught classes in the Ruidoso Valley. At some point, she worked as the principal of the consolidated school system of San Patricio. In 1917, Holland was elected the Superintendent of Schools in Lincoln County; in this position, she made novel decisions for the time period, consolidating smaller schools into a larger district. In December 1920, Holland married a rancher, Wilbur Coe, who supported her political and educational ambitions. Later on, in 1938, a local newspaper stated that after she married, she "began to live on a ranch in the Ruidoso Valley in the White Mountains of the south central section of New Mexico. Two miles away from her ranch home was a one-room school attended only bv Spanish-American children. Teachers for this school were hard to find and none ever stayed for a full term. Motivated by this Louise Coe decided to teach here and give these children who were her friends and neighbors a better opportunity."

== Political career and continuing education ==
In 1924, Coe was elected to the New Mexico Senate as its first female senator, just four years after women won the right to vote, and just three years after women won the right to run for office in New Mexico. She represented Lincoln, Otero, Socorro and Torrance counties. She held her office from 1925 to 1941, for four consecutive terms. Coe's main focus was on education, including programs and legislation that improved the state's public education system. For 12 years, she was the chairman of the Senate Education and "was influential in securing legislation providing free textbooks, larger libraries, higher teacher qualifications and salaries, and designating sales and severance taxes as school revenues." Outside of education, Coe sponsored legislation that would have given women the right to control their property. Coe was elected by her peers as the Senate president pro tempore from 1929 to the end of her term, the nation's first woman president pro tempore in any senate.

Coe attended the University of New Mexico and graduated in 1930 with a Bachelor of Science in Education with a minor in Spanish. While at university, she joined the women's fraternity Alpha Delta Pi.

In 1940, Coe ran for a position in the United States House of Representatives and was the first Democratic woman to do so. However, she lost to Clinton Presba Anderson in the primary election. After Coe left her position in the state Senate, no woman would be elected until 1965. As of 2012, Coe is still the only female president pro tempore of the New Mexico Senate.

== Later life ==
In 1980, Mortar Board, an academic honors society, awarded Coe the Distinguished Women Award for her "outstanding contributions to education and government in New Mexico."

Louise Holland Coe and her husband Wilbur may eventually have moved to Glencoe, New Mexico, an unincorporated community nearby. This community was named in her family's honor. Through her life, she traveled to various countries, including Thailand, Japan, and India.

Coe died in 1985 from unstated natural causes, at Casa Maria Health Care Center in Roswell, New Mexico. Her remains were cremated and buried at her family's private cemetery in Glencoe.

== Publications ==
- Coe, Louise Holland; Robinson, Amye (1981). Lady and the law books : sixteen years first and only woman member of the New Mexico Senate. Albuquerque, New Mexico: Modern Press. (Originally published in New Mexico Magazine in the 1970s)
- Coe, Louise Holland (February 1984). "Lady Rancher on the Ruidoso". New Mexico Magazine. Vol. 52. p. 30.
- Coe, Louise Holland; Robinson, Amye (1984). Highroads to friendships. Roswell, New Mexico: Hall-Poorbaugh.
