= Carolyn Wyeth =

American painter (1909–1994)

- Born: October 26, 1909
- Died: March 1, 1994 (aged 84); Chadds Ford, Pennsylvania, U.S.
- Father: N. C. Wyeth
- Relatives: Andrew Wyeth (brother); Jamie Wyeth (nephew); Henriette Wyeth Hurd (sister); Nathaniel Wyeth (brother); Andrew Wyeth (brother)
- Known for: Painting

Carolyn Wyeth (/ˈwaɪɛθ/ WY-eth; October 26, 1909 – March 1, 1994), daughter of N.C. Wyeth and sister of Andrew Wyeth, was a well-known artist in her own right. Her hometown was Chadds Ford, Pennsylvania. She worked and taught out of N. C. Wyeth House and Studio. Her nephew, Jamie Wyeth was one of her students.

== Biography ==
=== Childhood ===
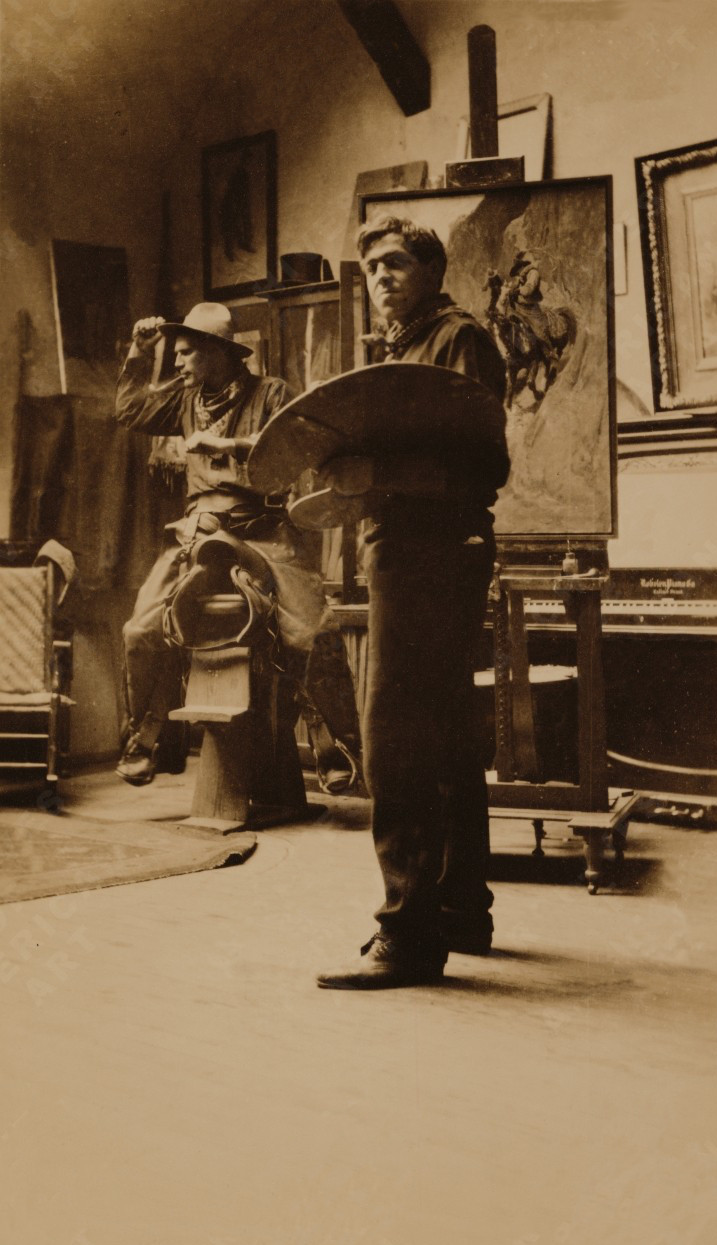
N.C. Wyeth in his studio with a cowboy model

Carolyn Wyeth (1909–1994) was the second child of illustrator and artist N.C. (Newell Convers) Wyeth and his wife, Carolyn Bockius Wyeth to live into their adulthood. Their first, also named Carolyn, was born in 1906 and died December of the same year. As a girl, Wyeth attended the Quaker Friends' School with her sister Henriette.

N.C. was an attentive father, fostering each of the children's interests and talents. The family was close, spending time reading together, taking walks, fostering "a closeness with nature" and developing a feeling for Wyeth family history. As Carolyn Wyeth said about her father to David McCullough for a Smithsonian video, "The Wyeths: A Father and his Family," "He did everything in a big way; if he bought paint he bought too much paint-which I do."

In the 1920s Wyeth's father had become a celebrity and the family often had celebrities as guests, such as F. Scott Fitzgerald and Mary Pickford. The home bustled with creative activity and competition.

N.C. and Carolyn's five children were all talented. Henriette Wyeth Hurd, the eldest, became a well-known painter of portraits and still lifes. Nathaniel Wyeth, the third child, was a successful inventor. Their fourth child, Ann, was a musician at a young age, then became a composer as an adult. Artist Andrew was the youngest child.

=== Artistic training ===
At the age of 12, Wyeth began training with her father in his studio starting with a foundational grounding in drawing using charcoal, mastering studies of cubes, pyramid and plaster casts. Her father's guidance to know and become emotionally in tune with her subjects became her artistic guiding principle.

=== Adulthood ===
Wyeth's sensitive nature lies beneath "her feisty, no-nonsense demeanor" attributes which are reflected in the direct yet perceptive depiction of her subjects. By her early 20s, Carolyn Wyeth found her own mode of expression and won exhibition awards and accolades.

She lived in her parents Chadds Ford home her entire life and married fellow artist Franceso Joseph Delle Donne (1919–2007) in 1941. They divorced in 1952. She died on March 1, 1994. Her grand-niece, Victoria Wyeth, described her as "She was crazy in a really fun way... she had like eight dogs around the house." After her death, her family held an unusual memorial service where her cremated remains "went kaboom" after being shot into the air in front of her home.

== Teaching ==
Wyeth taught painting for more than 30 years starting in the 1940s, primarily at Chadds Ford, and also in Maine during the summers.

At age 12, Wyeth's nephew Jamie began study in the studio filled with the art work and props of his grandfather. In the morning he studied English and history at his home, and in the afternoon joined other students at the studio, learning fundamentals of drawing and composition. He stated later, "She was very restrictive. It wasn't interesting, but it was important." Through Wyeth, Jamie developed an interest in working with oil, a medium he enjoyed at a sensory level: the look, smell and feel of it.

== Style and technique ==
Wyeth found her inspiration for her work in solitude of Chadds Ford. For her, painting was soothing. She followed her own path artistically, yet like her father and brother Andrew she drew from her life and the surroundings of Chadd Ford. Wyeth's work reflects strong design, bold color and nuanced emotion. Wyeth primarily painted still lifes of items that were part of her daily life, like a chair, pumpkin, items in the studio. She also drew landscapes of the woods and fields seen around her home. Wyeth painted about four paintings a year and rarely exhibited. Of her work, Brandywine Museum published: "Her paintings reconstruct private moments from the past and often evoke an air of romance, remembrance and loss."

Wyeth passed some of her traits to her nephew. Both prefer to work with oil paint and charcoal. Wyeth enjoys working with animals "particularly chickens and dogs", as does Jamie. Both also enjoy solitude to work. Carolyn said to Richard Meryman in an interview "I think all great stuff comes out of being alone. At the time you may feel lonely, but it's doing something wonderful to you."

== Exhibitions ==
- "Unique Force: The Art of Carolyn Wyeth" at the Brandywine River Museum in 2008 included 40 paintings and drawings, including portraits of family members, including her brother Andrew. It was the first exhibition of her work in 30 years.

== See also ==
- Wyeth
