= Glencoe, New Mexico =

Unincorporated community in the United States

- Unincorporated community
- Location within New Mexico Location within the United States
- Coordinates: 33°24′33″N 105°26′56″W
- Country: United States
- State: New Mexico
- County: Lincoln
- Elevation: 5,738 ft (1,749 m)
- Time zone: UTC-7 (Mountain (MST))
  - Summer (DST): UTC-6 (MDT)
- ZIP code: 88324
- Area code: 575
- GNIS feature ID: 906564

Glencoe is an unincorporated community in Lincoln County, New Mexico, United States. Its ZIP code is 88324.

The community is located on the Rio Ruidoso and U.S. Highway 70, between Ruidoso Downs and San Patricio. It is just east of the Lincoln National Forest. It contains one location the State Register of Cultural Properties, St. Anne's Chapel. Its economy is historically based on agriculture, and its inhabitants have historically participated in ranch dances, rodeos, and baseball games. The area was settled in the 1880s, and as of the 2010 census, had a population of 210 people.

== History ==
The community was named after the word glen, a Scottish term for a valley, and the Coe family, including outlaws George Coe and Frank Coe. The Coe family began settling in the area around 1880 after moving south from Las Vegas, Nevada and working the Santa Fe Trail throughout the 1870s. After the Lincoln County War ended in 1881, the family members temporarily left the area as the side they had backed had lost, though they would return to settle promptly. They built a school and post office in 1882, officially naming the town then. Other early families included the Bonnells and Sanchezes.

In 1929, Reverend Frederick Bingham Howden began collecting money from services to build a permanent church, St. Anne's Chapel, of which a local builder began construction in 1933. The chapel was named after the mother of the wife of Frank Coe, and its architecture is attributed to John Gaw Meem, also a close personal friend of Reverend Howden.

The Great Depression hit the area in the 1930s, affecting the farming community.

After the Ruidoso Downs Race Track was built in 1952, families in the area stopped focusing on farming to work at the racetrack instead, though many still kept some cows.

New Mexico's first female state senator Louise Holland Coe married into the namesake Coe family. Holland Coe and her husband Wilbur may have moved to Glencoe after her retirement from politics. After her death in 1985 in Roswell, New Mexico, her remains were cremated and buried at her family's private cemetery in Glencoe.

In 2002, St. Anne's Chapel was added to the State Register of Cultural Properties.

== Geography and infrastructure ==
Glencoe is located near the Rio Ruidoso flowing from the Sierra Blanca, with Ruidoso Downs six miles to the west and San Patricio six miles to the east.

The community has two churches, St. Anne's Chapel and San Ysidro Catholic Church, though San Ysidro is now only used for funerals and the Catholic community attending St. Jude's Church in San Patricio.

It lies along U.S. Route 70 and is a 10.4 mile drive away from Sierra Blanca Regional Airport.

== Demographics ==
As of the census of 2010, the zip code had 210 residents, 92 households, and 67 families. There were 126 housing units. The racial makeup of the village was 91.4% White, 0% African American, 3.3% Native American, 0% Asian, 0% Pacific Islander, 6.2% from other races, and 0.9% from two or more races. Hispanic or Latino of any race were 40.0% of the population.

Out of the 92 households, 17.4% had individuals under the age of 18 living with them, 58.6% were married couples living together, 7.6% had a female householder, 6.5% had a male householder, and 27.2% were non-families. 20.7% of all households were made up of individuals, and 10.9% had someone living alone who was 65 years of age or older. The average household size was 2.28 and the average family size was 2.58.

In terms of age, 13.8% were under the age of 18, 3.3% from 18 to 24, 17.1% from 25 to 44, 34.8% from 45 to 64, and 31.0% who were 65 years of age or older. The median age was 52 years. For every 100 females, there were 100 males. For every 100 females age 18 and over, there were 110.5 males.

As of the census of 2000, the median household income was $28,750, and the median income for a family was $29,792. Males had median earnings of $34,063 versus $48,750 for females. The per capita income for the village was $17,670. About 9.7% of families and 17.3% of the population were below the poverty line, including 40.0% of those age 65 or over.

== Economy ==
The community and region are known for growing apples. Other orchard fruits and more general agricultural products were also sold to truckers who would then transport the produce to Texas. By 1950, however, the Washington state apple industry outcompeted the area producers, and many families switched to ranches and pastures instead. As U.S. Route 70 was realigned in the next few decades, smaller produce stands were no longer located on the main highway, driving yet more families to ranching instead. Both women and men worked as cowboys, with some of Frank Coe's daughters outcompeting Texas cowboys in 1918.

After cars became widely used, the area received tourists who wanted to experience the Wild West, and local ranches accommodated guests with horse rides and resources for overnight stops.

== Education ==
Before the 1940s, children were educated at various local homes, with the local one-room Glencoe School built around 1934. After the school was torn down in the 1940s, children attended the Stetson School in Ruidoso Downs.

== Culture and entertainment ==
Until a 1941 flood, members of Glencoe and nearby communities held dances on the ranches for entertainment and as social events, with local musicians playing regardless of age. Parents taught children how to play instruments, and on occasion, families formed multi-generational orchestras. Baseball games and rodeos also featured as local recreational activities.

The Glencoe Distillery uses the region's fruit, grain, and nut productions to produce liquors. The community is also near the location of Fox Cave, a former hideout for Billy the Kid which has at various times hosted a museum, gift shop, and other retailers.

== Notable people ==
- Frank Coe (1851-1931), Old West cowboy, and for a time, member of the Lincoln County Regulators
- George Coe (1856-1941), Old West cowboy, and for a time, member of the Lincoln County Regulators
- Louise Holland Coe (1894-1985), first woman elected to the New Mexico Senate, first woman to run for U.S. Congress
- Dub Williams (1927-2014), rancher and politician, lived in Glencoe.
