= Peter Hurd =

American artist (1904–1984)

- Henriette Wyeth, Portrait of Peter Hurd, 1936
- Born: February 22, 1904; Roswell, Territory of New Mexico, United States
- Died: July 9, 1984 (aged 80); Roswell, New Mexico
- Education: N.C. Wyeth
- Known for: Illustration, painting
- Spouse: Henriette Wyeth

Peter Hurd (February 22, 1904 – July 9, 1984) was an American painter whose work is strongly associated with the people and landscapes of San Patricio, New Mexico, where he lived from the 1930s. He is equally acclaimed for his portraits and his western landscapes.

Early in his life, Hurd studied in Chadds Ford, Pennsylvania under the noted illustrator N. C. Wyeth, along with two of his grown children. Hurd later married the painter's eldest daughter, Henriette Wyeth, who also is known as an accomplished painter. During World War II, Hurd worked for Life magazine as a war correspondent attached to the US Air Force. He created hundreds of "War Sketches".

== Life ==
Born in Roswell, New Mexico, Peter Hurd originally attended military school before he realized he loved painting and wanted to pursue it professionally. After graduating from the New Mexico Military Institute in Roswell, he was halfway through West Point when he changed course to follow his true calling. He moved to Philadelphia, where he graduated from the Pennsylvania Academy of Fine Arts, which he entered in 1924. Afterward, he became a private pupil of N. C. Wyeth, a noted illustrator and painter based in an area near the city.

Hurd worked alongside Wyeth’s own children, Andrew and Henriette, who were also studying under their father. Hurd worked as Wyeth's assistant at his studio in Chadds Ford, Pennsylvania, for a number of years. In 1929, he married Henriette Wyeth. They had three children, Peter, Carol, and Michael Hurd.

In the mid-1930s, during the Great Depression, the Hurds moved to San Patricio, New Mexico, settling on 40 acres. They gradually acquired more land, developing the 2200-acre Sentinel Ranch. The ranch and its surrounds provided endless material for their work. Their painting careers developed side by side. Henriette focused on floral studies, oil portraits, and still life paintings.

Hurd worked at capturing the landscape and the people who lived within it. His large egg tempera paintings of the local landscape earned him national recognition; reproductions were published in Life magazine. Later, during World War II, Life magazine sent Hurd all over the world as a combat correspondent with the US Air Force. He covered almost all the fronts of the far-flung battle line, creating hundreds of "War Sketches" that range from poignant to comic.

Hurd’s years with the Air Force had a profound effect on his artistic work. He had always been a careful and precise worker when he worked in tempera. But as an embedded war reporter documenting urgent or fleeting moments, he had to draw and work much more quickly. He began using watercolor, which he soon mastered. When he returned to painting the New Mexico landscapes, his work was characterized by a new freedom and looseness, but still displayed his customary subtle tones as a gifted colorist.

Some of Hurd’s most well-known portraits were of his neighbors, family, and friends at Sentinel Ranch. He loved to paint people who were deeply connected to the land, and always showed them outdoors, against the hills and sky. He wrote, “the ones I like best to paint are those whose lives are spent under the sky: Men whose clothing, skin and eyes are all conditioned by the wind.” His Portrait of Jose shows the foreman of Sentinel Ranch amid the ridges of the land he cared for. In what is perhaps Hurd’s hallmark work, Eve of St. John, Herrera’s daughter is bathed in the light of a candle she carries.

From 1953 to 1954, Hurd was commissioned for a major mural by Texas Technological College (now Texas Tech University) in Lubbock, Texas. He and his assistants painted the fresco mural in the rotunda of what was then the West Texas Museum (now Holden Hall). Hurd completed about one fresco per week over a two-year period, depicting pioneers and influential leaders of West Texas.

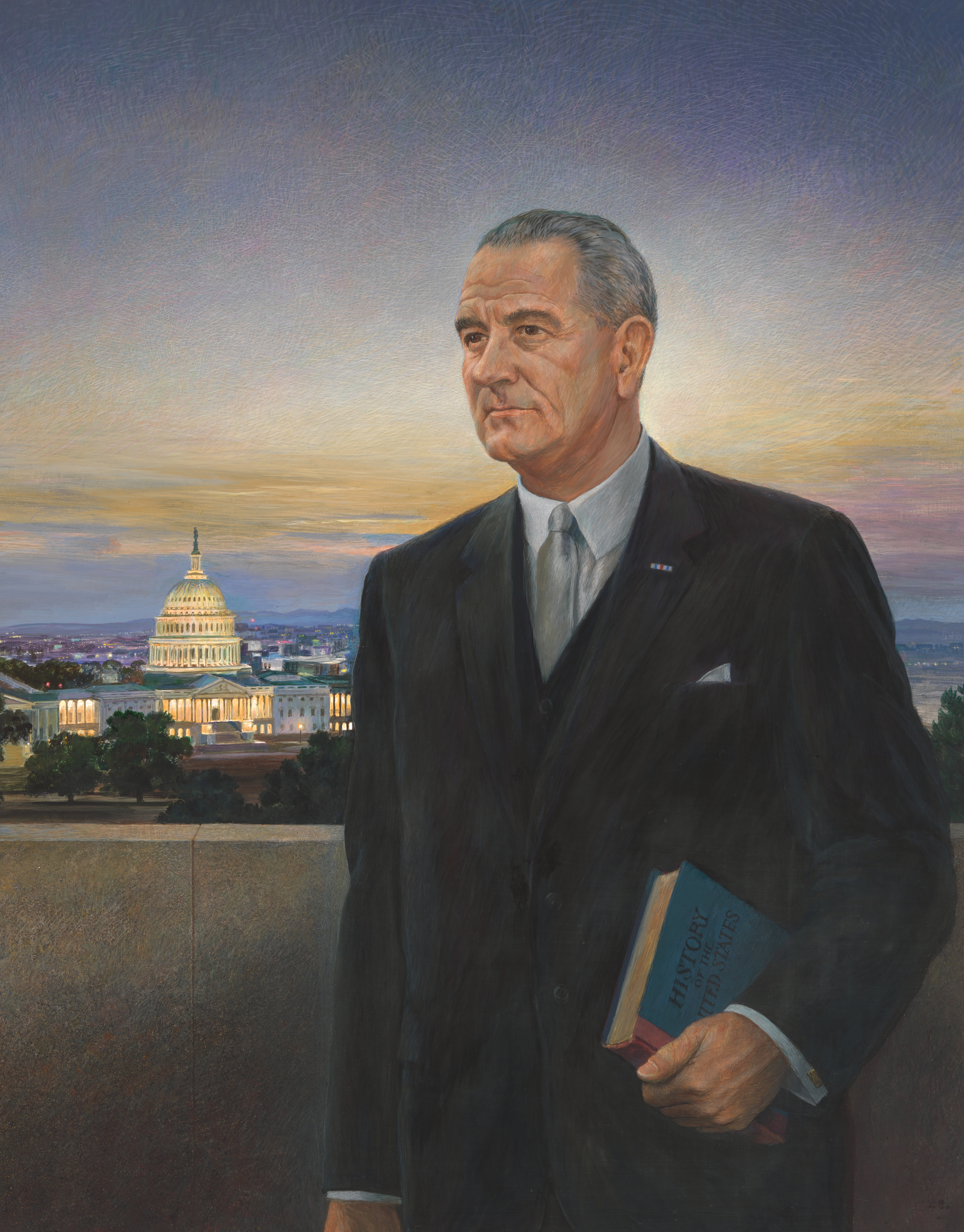
Hurd's LBJ portrait

Hurd also was commissioned to paint the official portraits of two heads of state, United States President Lyndon B. Johnson and King Faisal of Saudi Arabia. He had previously done a portrait of the former for the cover of the January 1, 1965 issue of TIME which announced the President-elect as the magazine's Man of the Year. He had received the commission because Johnson liked his work. Usually needing 30 hours with a live model for such a portrait, he was granted one half-hour sitting at Camp David. It took Hurd 400 hours to complete the portrait, relying exclusively on photographs. Upon first viewing the finished painting under less than ideal lighting at his ranch in late-October 1965, Johnson famously rejected it by saying, "That’s the ugliest thing I ever saw." When Hurd asked the President about his portrait style preference, Johnson responded with one done by Norman Rockwell for LOOK's presidential election coverage in its October 20, 1964 issue. This story wasn't made public until it was the subject of a feature article in The Washington Post on January 5, 1967. After a travelling exhibition to raise funds for various nonprofit organizations around the country, Hurd donated the painting to the Smithsonian Institution's National Portrait Gallery where it's currently on display. The only stipulation was that it wouldn't be exhibited until after Johnson left office. The official Johnson presidential portrait that hangs at the White House was painted by Elizabeth Shoumatoff.

Many of Hurd's works, along with those of his wife Henriette Wyeth, father-in-law N.C. Wyeth, and son Michael Hurd, can be seen at the Hurd-La Rinconada Gallery in San Patricio, New Mexico.

== Works ==
Hurd set many of his works in southeastern New Mexico, on his family's ranch in San Patricio and in the Hondo Valley.

Some of his works include:

- The Eve of St. John
- The Oasis
- The Gate and Beyond
- The Red Pickup
- The Late Call
- The Future Belongs To Those Who Prepare For It - this mural was originally located inside the Prudential Building in Houston, Texas, which has since been demolished. The mural was saved and relocated in 2010 to a new public library building in Artesia, New Mexico.
