= Joseph Wyeth =

Joseph Wyeth (1663–1731) was an English merchant and Quaker controversial writer.

== Life ==
The son of Henry and Sarah Wyeth, he was born on 19 September 1663 in the parish of St Saviour, Southwark. He became a successful London merchant.

Wyeth died of fever on 9 January 1731, and was buried at the Park, Worcester Street, Southwark, on the 15th. His wife Margaret died at Tottenham, aged 76, on 13 September 1749, and was buried with her husband.

== Works ==
Wyeth was the author of several controversial works. ‘Anguis Flagellatus: or a Switch for the Snake. Being an answer to the Third and Last Edition of the Snake in the Grass’ London, 1699, was a reply to Charles Leslie. To this a supplement was added by George Whitehead, to whose ‘Antidote against the Venom of the Snake in the Grass’ Wyeth had also written what he calls ‘An Appendix’ or sequel (published separately) entitled ‘Primitive Christianity continued in the Faith and Practice of the People called Quakers,’ London, 1698. Of all the attacks upon early quakerism, Leslie's ‘Snake in the Grass’ provoked the most replies. The ‘Switch’ was answered by Richard Mather, and ‘Primitive Christianity’ by Francis Bugg. Wyeth also contributed ‘An Answer to a Letter from Dr. Bray,’ London, 1700, and ‘Remarks on Dr. Bray's Memorial,’ London, 1701, to the opposition organised by the quakers against the establishment of a state church in Maryland, which Thomas Bray as commissary-general, succeeded in carrying through the English parliament in 1701.

He was for twenty years a friend of Thomas Ellwood, whose ‘Life’ he prepared for the press, adding a supplement, preface, and bibliography to the first edition, 1714. For the preparation of this he reviewed many letters and documents which had formerly belonged to John Milton; the most important of them were afterwards published by John Nickolls, who had at one time been apprenticed to Wyeth.

He also published ‘The Athenian Society unvail'd, or their Ignorance and Envious Abusing of the Quakers detected and reprehended,’ London, 1692, and ‘A Vindication of W. P. from the Erronious [sic] and False Testimony of Thomas Budd. Being an Answer to a sheet of his entitled “A Testimony for Truth against Error,”’ London, 1697, supporting William Penn against Thomas Budd.
