= Wyeth-Smith House =

Historic house in Massachusetts, US

- U.S. National Register of Historic Places
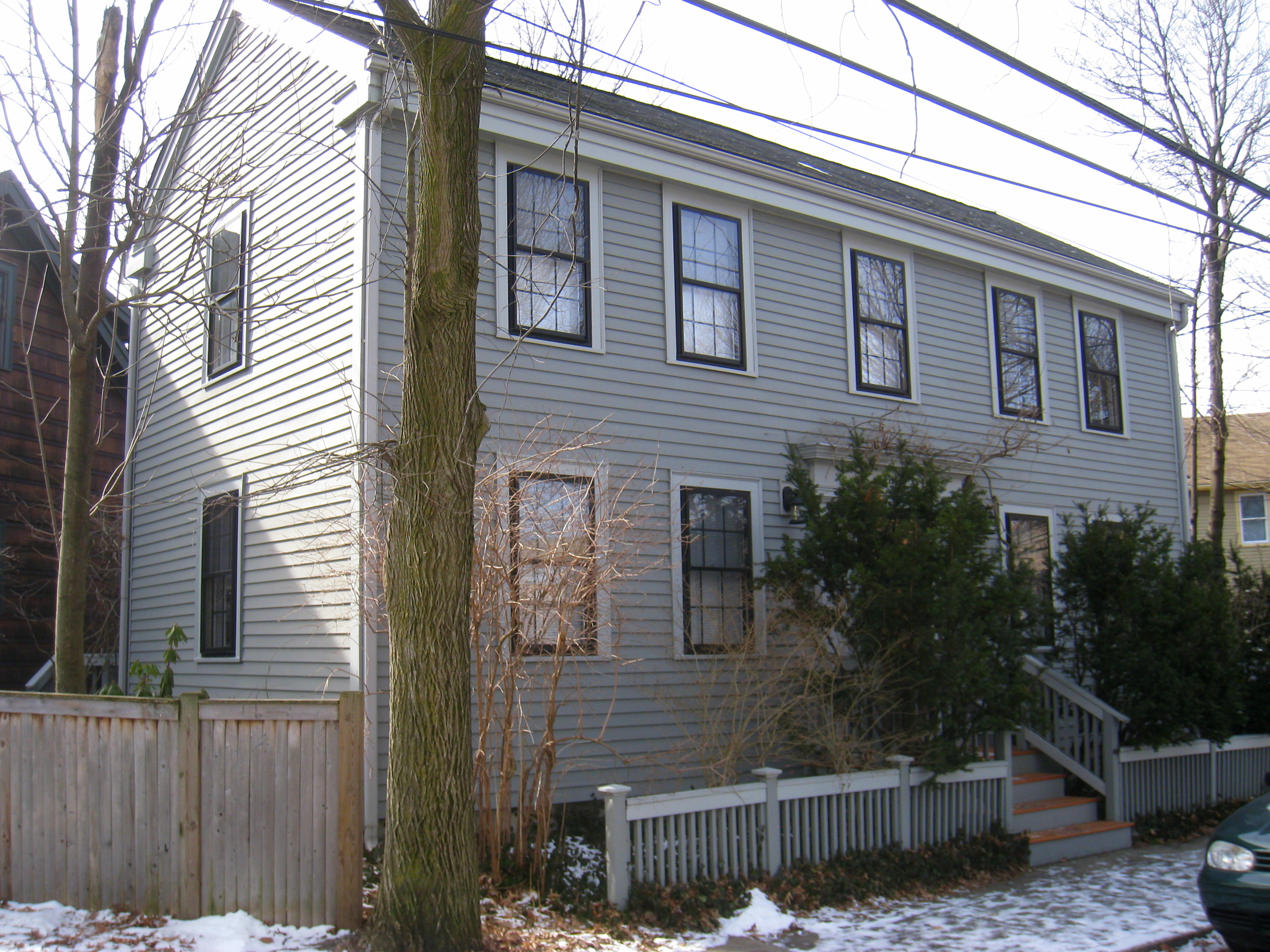

- Location within Massachusetts Location within the United States
- Location: 152 Vassal Lane, Cambridge, Massachusetts
- Coordinates: 42°23′00.8″N 71°08′20.1″W
- Built: 1820
- Architectural style: Federal
- MPS: Cambridge MRA
- NRHP reference No.: 82001989
- Added to NRHP: April 13, 1982

The Wyeth-Smith House is an historic house in Cambridge, Massachusetts. It is a 2 1/2-story wood-frame structure, five bays wide, with a side-gable roof. Its only significant decorative element is the entrance, which is flanked by sidelight windows and pilasters, with an entablature above. It was built in 1820 by Jacob Wyeth, and leased to Ebenezer Smith, a tenant farmer. The house, which is the finest extant period farmhouse in the area, was originally located at the junction of Fresh Pond Parkway and Huron Avenue, and was relocated to its present site in 1893.

The house was listed on the National Register of Historic Places in 1982.

== See also ==
- National Register of Historic Places listings in Cambridge, Massachusetts
