= N. C. Wyeth =

American illustrator and painter (1882–1945)

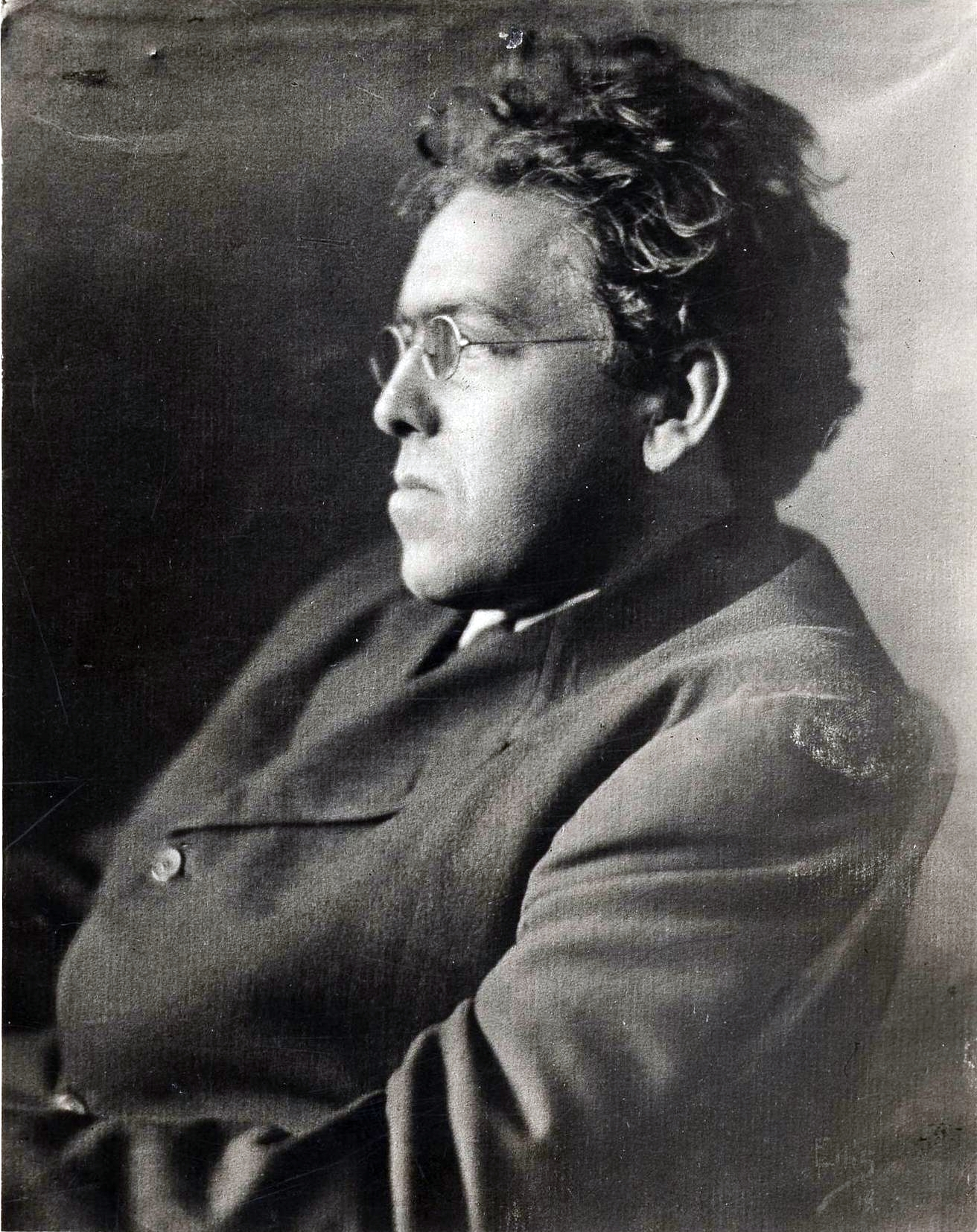
- Wyeth c. 1920
- Born: Newell Convers Wyeth; October 22, 1882; Needham, Massachusetts, U.S.
- Died: October 19, 1945 (aged 62); Chadds Ford, Pennsylvania, U.S.
- Known for: Illustration, painting
- Notable work: Treasure Island; Robinson Crusoe
- Style: Brandywine School
- Movement: Realism, Romanticism
- Spouse: Carolyn Brenneman Bockius of Wilmington (m. 1906)
- Children: Andrew Wyeth; Henriette Wyeth Hurd; Carolyn Wyeth; Ann Wyeth McCoy; Nathaniel C. Wyeth
- Family: Jamie Wyeth (grandson)

Newell Convers Wyeth (October 22, 1882 – October 19, 1945) was an American painter and illustrator. He was a student of Howard Pyle and became one of America's most well-known illustrators. Wyeth created more than 3,000 paintings and illustrated 112 books — 25 of them for Scribner's, the Scribner Classics, which is the body of work for which he is best known. The first of these, Treasure Island, was one of his masterpieces and the proceeds paid for his studio. Wyeth was a realist painter at a time when the camera and photography began to compete with his craft. Sometimes seen as melodramatic, his illustrations were designed to be understood quickly. Wyeth, who was both a painter and an illustrator, understood the difference, and said in 1908, "Painting and illustration cannot be mixed—one cannot merge from one into the other."

He was the father of Andrew Wyeth and the grandfather of Jamie Wyeth, both also notable American painters.

== Early life ==
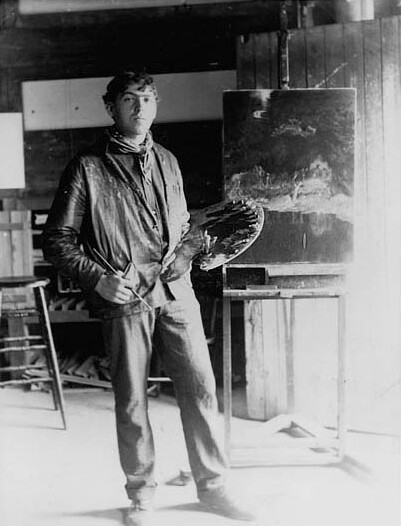
Wyeth in his studio, c. 1903

Wyeth was born in 1882, in Massachusetts to parents Andrew Newell Wyeth II and Henriette Zirngiebel Wyeth. An ancestor, Nicholas Wyeth, a stonemason, came to Massachusetts from England in 1645. Later ancestors were prominent participants in the French and Indian Wars, the Revolutionary War, the War of 1812, and the American Civil War, passing down rich oral histories and tradition to Wyeth and his family and providing subject matter for his art, which was deeply felt. His maternal ancestors came from Switzerland, and during her childhood, his mother was acquainted with literary giants Henry David Thoreau and Henry Wadsworth Longfellow. His literary appreciation and artistic talents appear to have come from her.

He was the oldest of four brothers who spent much time hunting, fishing, and enjoying other outdoor pursuits, and doing chores on their farm. His varied youthful activities and his naturally astute sense of observation later aided the authenticity of his illustrations and obviated the need for models: "When I paint a figure on horseback, a man plowing, or a woman buffeted by the wind, I have an acute sense of the muscle strain."

His mother encouraged his early inclination toward art. Wyeth was doing excellent watercolor paintings by age twelve. He went to Mechanics Arts School to learn drafting, and then Massachusetts Normal Art School, where painting instructor Richard Andrew advised him to become an illustrator. He then went on to the Eric Pape School of Art to learn illustration, under George Loftus Noyes and Charles W. Reed.

== Career ==
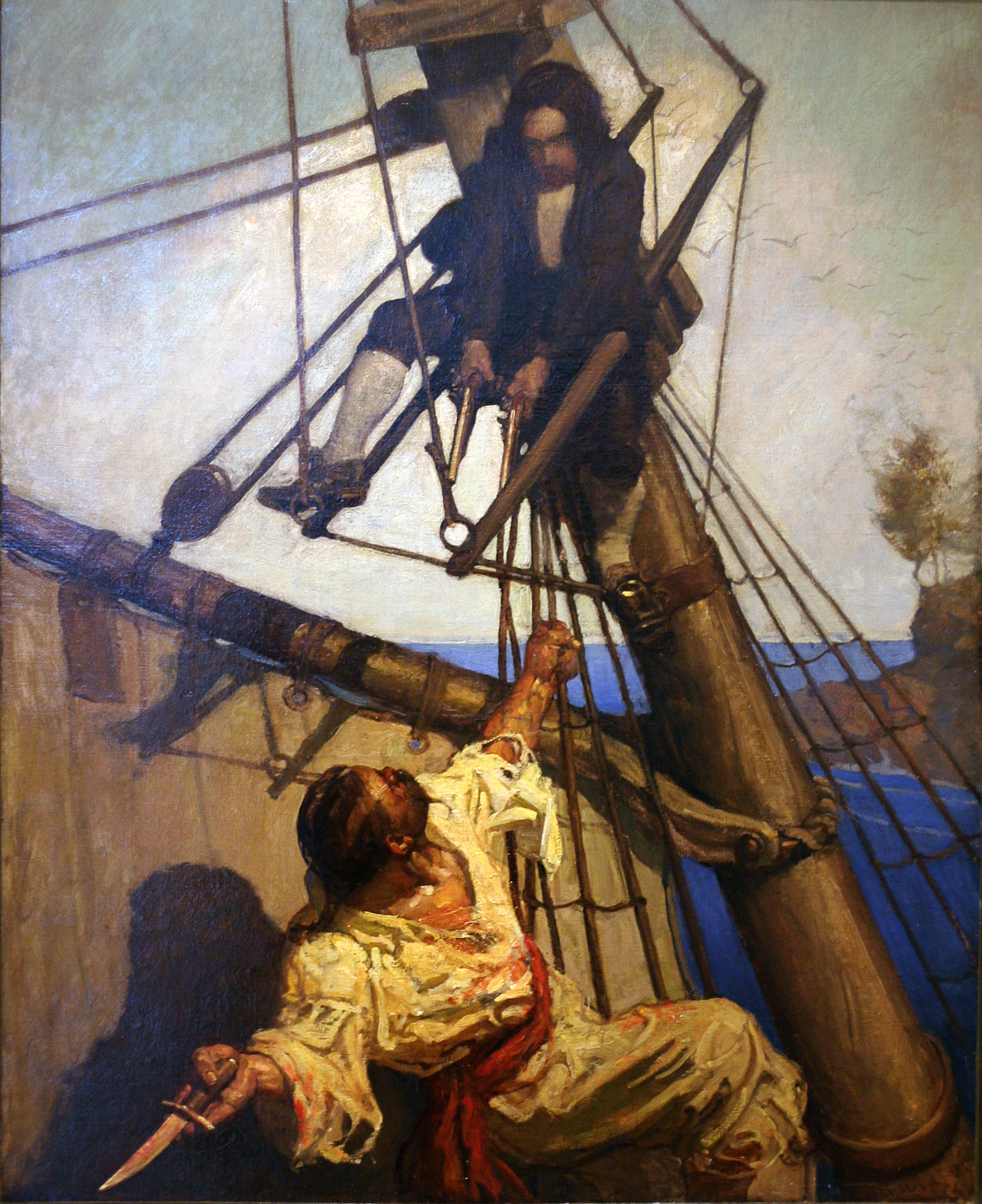
One More Step, Mr. Hands, Treasure Island (1911) by Robert Louis Stevenson

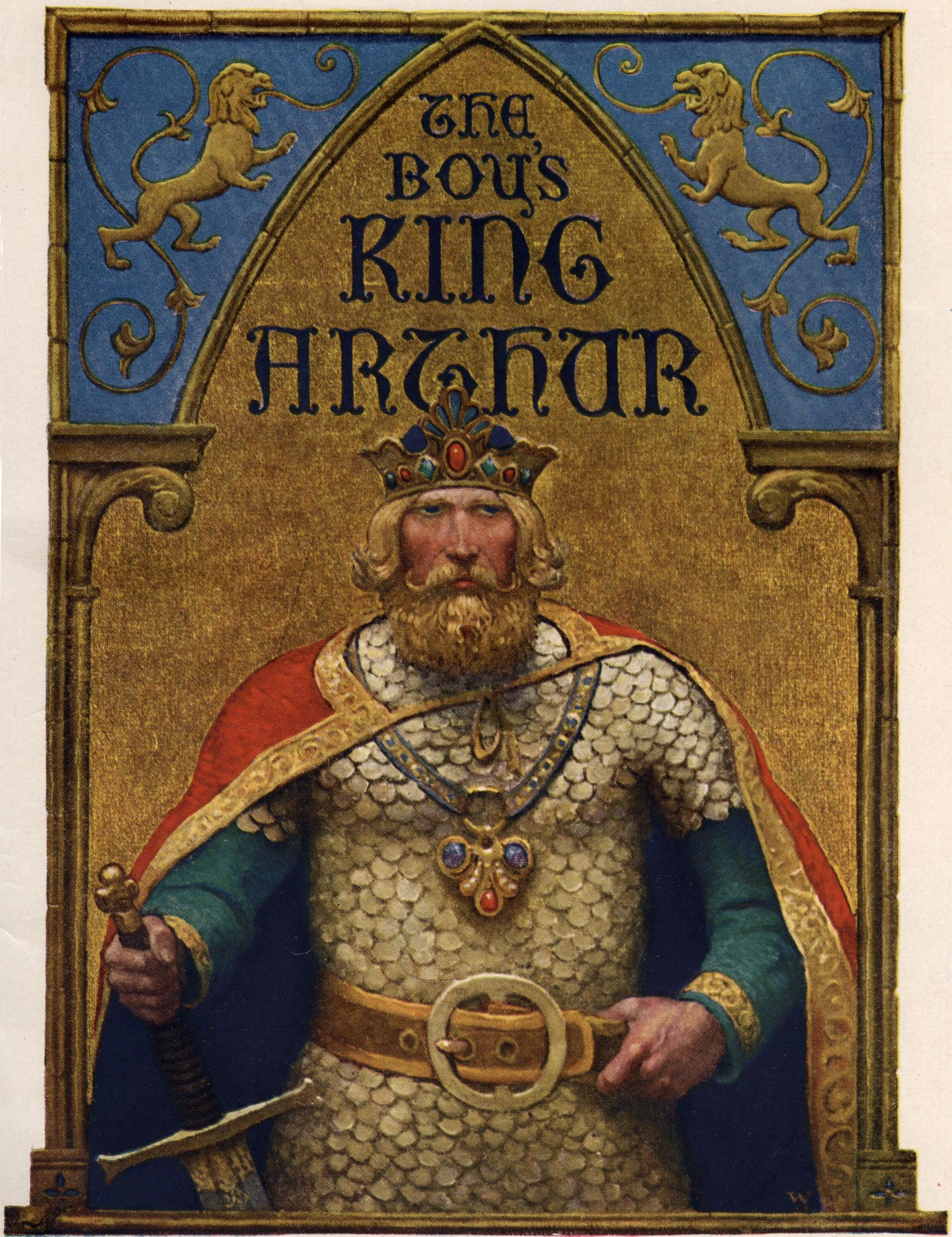
Title page, The Boy's King Arthur (1922), by Sidney Lanier

Wyeth traveled to the Brandywine Valley to study with Howard Pyle, eventually settling in Chadds Ford, Pennsylvania. A bucking bronco for the cover of The Saturday Evening Post on February 21, 1903, was Wyeth's first commission as an illustrator. That year he described his work as "true, solid American subjects—nothing foreign about them".

It was a spectacular accomplishment for the twenty-year-old Wyeth, after just a few months under Pyle's tutelage. In 1904, the same magazine commissioned him to illustrate a Western story, and Pyle urged Wyeth to go West to acquire direct knowledge, much as Zane Grey had done for his Western novels. In Colorado, he worked as a cowboy alongside the professional "punchers", moving cattle and doing ranch chores. He visited the Navajo in Arizona and New Mexico and gained an understanding of aboriginal American culture. When his money was stolen, he worked as a mail carrier, riding between the Two Grey Hills, New Mexico trading post and Fort Defiance, Arizona, to earn enough to get back home. He wrote home, "The life is wonderful, strange—the fascination of it clutches me like some unseen animal—it seems to whisper, 'Come back, you belong here, this is your real home.'"

On a second trip two years later, he collected information on mining and brought home costumes and artifacts, including cowboy and aboriginal American clothing. His early trips to the western United States inspired a period of images of cowboys and aboriginal Americans that dramatized the Old West.

Upon returning to Chadds Ford, he painted a series of farm scenes for Scribner's Magazine, finding the landscape less dramatic than that of the West but nonetheless a rich environment for his art: "Everything lies in its subtleties, everything is so gentle and simple, so unaffected." His painting Mowing (1907), not done for illustration, was among his most successful images of rural life.

In 1906, Wyeth had married Carolyn Brenneman Bockius of Wilmington. In 1908 they moved to Chadds Ford, Pennsylvania, along the Brandywine Creek. The Wyeths created a stimulating household for their talented children Andrew Wyeth, Henriette Wyeth Hurd, Carolyn Wyeth, Ann Wyeth McCoy, and Nathaniel C. Wyeth. In 1937, Nathaniel would marry Howard Pyle's niece. Wyeth was very sociable, and frequent visitors included F. Scott Fitzgerald, Joseph Hergesheimer, Hugh Walpole, Lillian Gish, and John Gilbert.

According to Andrew, who spent the most time with his father due to his sickly childhood, Wyeth was a strict but patient father who did not talk down to his children. His hard work as an illustrator gave his family the financial freedom to follow their own artistic and scientific pursuits.

Andrew went on to become one of the foremost American painters of the second half of the 20th century, and both Henriette and Carolyn became painters also; Ann became a painter and composer. Nathaniel became an engineer for DuPont and worked on the team that invented the plastic soda bottle. Henriette and Ann married two of Wyeth's protégés, Peter Hurd and John W. McCoy. Wyeth is the grandfather of painters Jamie Wyeth and Michael Hurd, and the musician Howard Wyeth.

By 1911, Wyeth began to move away from Western subjects and on to illustrating classic literature. He painted a series for an edition of Treasure Island (1911), by Robert Louis Stevenson, thought by many to be his finest group of illustrations. The set made him famous, and the proceeds from this great success paid for his house and studio. He also illustrated editions of Kidnapped (1913), Robin Hood (1917), The Last of the Mohicans (1919), Robinson Crusoe (1920), Rip Van Winkle (1921), The White Company (1922), and The Yearling (1939). He did work for prominent periodicals, including Century, Harper's Monthly, Ladies' Home Journal, McClure's, Outing, The Popular Magazine, and Scribner's.

By 1914, Wyeth loathed the commercialism upon which he became dependent, and for the rest of his life he battled internally over his capitulation, accusing himself of having "bitched myself with the accursed success in skin-deep pictures and illustrations". He complained of money men "who want to buy me piecemeal" and that "an illustration must be made practical, not only in its dramatic statement, but it must be a thing that will adapt itself to the engravers' and printers' limitations. This fact alone kills that underlying inspiration to create thought. Instead of expressing that inner feeling, you express the outward thought… or imitation of that feeling."

Wyeth also did posters, calendars, and advertisements for clients such as Lucky Strike, Cream of Wheat, and Coca-Cola, as well as paintings of Beethoven, Wagner, and Liszt for Steinway & Sons. He painted murals of historical and allegorical subjects for the Federal Reserve Bank of Boston, the Westtown School, the First National Bank of Boston, the Hotel Roosevelt, the Franklin Savings Bank, the National Geographic Society, the Wilmington Savings Fund Society, and other public and private buildings. During both World Wars, he contributed patriotic images to government and private agencies. Wyeth was a member of The Franklin Inn Club in Philadelphia.

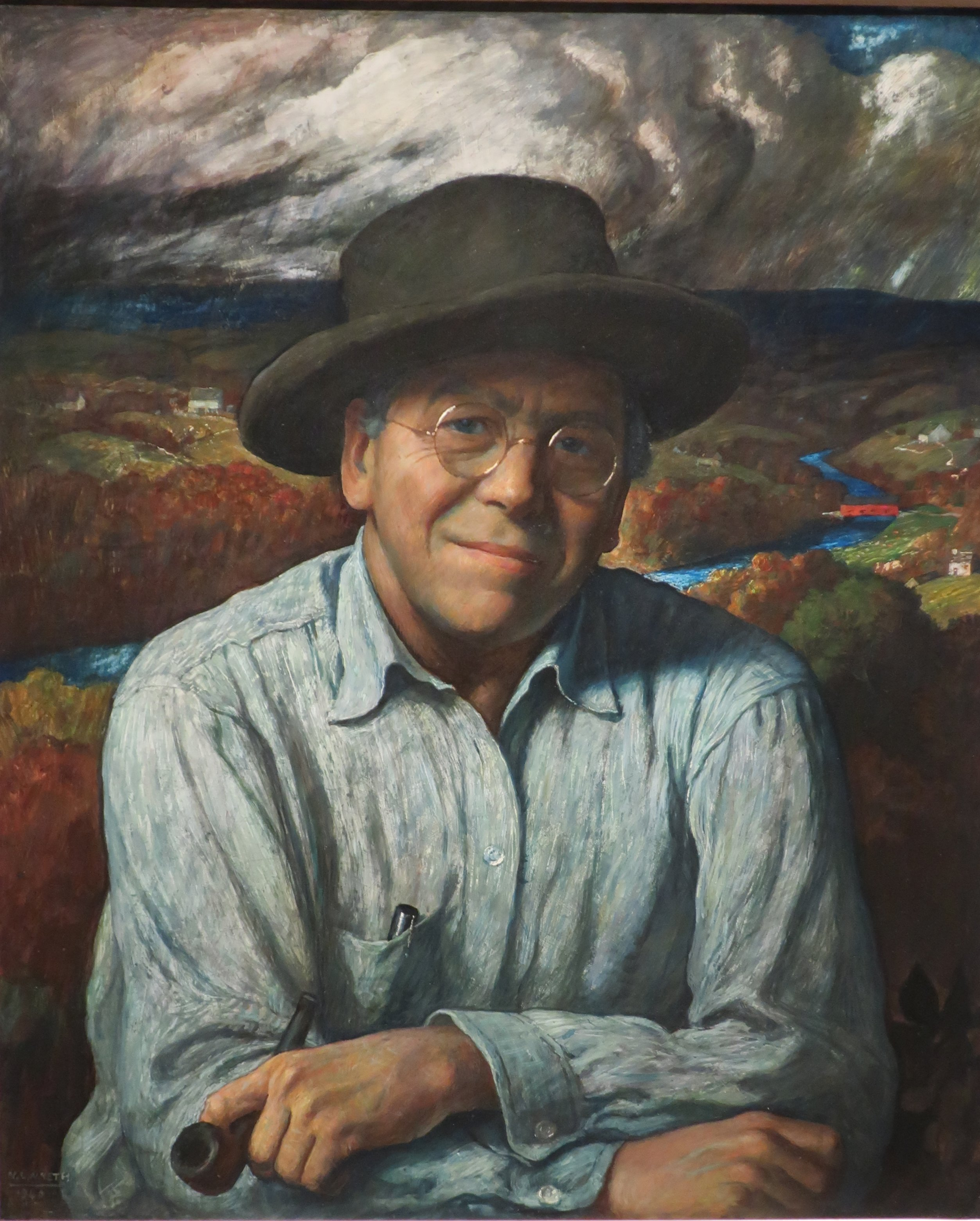
Self-portrait by N. C. Wyeth, 1940

His nonillustrative portrait and landscape paintings changed dramatically in style throughout his life as he experimented first with impressionism in the 1910s (feeling an affinity with the nearby "New Hope Group"), the principles of the divisionist painter Giovanni Segantini, then by the 1930s veering to the realistic American regionalism of Thomas Hart Benton and Grant Wood, painting with thin oils and, occasionally, egg tempera. That was the medium favored by his son Andrew, and introduced to both of them by his son-in-law Peter Hurd. Wyeth worked rapidly and experimented constantly, often working on a larger scale than necessary, befitting his energetic and grand vision which often harked back to his ancestral past. He could conceive, sketch and paint a large painting in as little as three hours.

Wyeth made four illustrations for a 1939 edition of Helen Hunt Jackson's Ramona, a novel about a Scottish-Native American orphan living in Southern California after the Mexican-American War. The second illustration out of the four, depicting the tension between Ramona and her mother Señora Moreno, was found 80 years later in a Savers thrift store for $4 and sold for $191,000 at auction in 2023.

== Death and legacy ==
In June 1945, Wyeth had received the honorary degree of Master of Arts from Bowdoin College. He was a member of the National Academy, the Society of Illustrators, the Philadelphia Water Color Club, the Fellowship of the Pennsylvania Academy of the Fine Arts, the Philadelphia Art Alliance, the Chester County Art Association, and the Wilmington Society of the Fine Arts.

In October 1945, Wyeth and his grandson (Nathaniel's son, whose name was also Newell) were killed when the automobile they were riding in was struck by a southbound Octoraro Branch freight train at a railway crossing over Ring Road near his Chadds Ford home. His vehicle was carried 143 feet (44 m) down the line and flipped several times before coming to a stop. At the time, Wyeth had been working on an ambitious series of murals for the Metropolitan Life Insurance Company depicting the Pilgrims at Plymouth, a series completed by Andrew Wyeth and John McCoy.

Significant public collections of Wyeth's work are on display at the Brandywine River Museum in Chadds Ford, in Maine at the Portland Museum of Art, and at the Farnsworth Art Museum in Rockland, Maine. The Brandywine River Museum offers tours of the N. C. Wyeth House and Studio in Chadds Ford. His home and studio were designated a National Historic Landmark in 1997, and are open to the public. His studio is set up just as he left it — the palette he used on the day of his death sits by his last canvas.

Wyeth's frontispiece illustration depicting Henry David Thoreau’s book Men of Concord was destroyed by a fire which occurred at the Maine Wyeth Art Gallery in September 2023.

== Bibliography ==
- Stevenson, R. L. – Treasure Island (Charles Scribner's Sons, New York, 1911)
- Johnston, M – The Long roll (Houghton Mifflin, 1911)
- Johnston, M – Cease Firing (Houghton Mifflin, 1912)
- Stevenson, R. L. – Kidnapped (Charles Scribner's Sons, New York, 1913)
- Clemens, S. – The Mysterious Stranger (Harper, 1916)
- Stevenson, R. L. – The Black Arrow (Charles Scribner's Sons, New York, 1916)
- Creswick, P. – Robin Hood (David McKay, Philadelphia, 1917)
- Verne, J. – The Mysterious Island (Charles Scribner's Sons, New York, 1918)
- Cooper, J. F. – The Last of the Mohicans (Charles Scribner's Sons, New York, 1919)
- Malory, T. – The Boy's King Arthur (Charles Scribner's Sons, New York, 1920)
- Kingsley, C. – Westward Ho! (Charles Scribner's Sons, New York, 1920)
- Defoe, D. – Robinson Crusoe (Cosmopolitan Book Corp., 1920)
- Irving, W. – Rip Van Winkle (David McKay, Philadelphia, 1921)
- Longfellow, H. W. – The Courtship of Miles Standish (Harrap, 1921)
- MacSpadden, J.W. & Wilson, C. – Robin Hood (Harrap, 1921)
- Porter, J. – The Scottish Chiefs (Hodder, 1921)
- Doyle, A. C. – The White Company (Cosmopolitan Book Corp. 1922)
- Matthews, J. B. – Poems of American Patriotism (Charles Scribner's Sons, New York, 1922)
- Bullfinch, T. – Legends of Charlemagne (David McKay, Philadelphia, 1924)
- Stevenson, R. L. – David Balfour (Charles Scribner's Sons, New York, 1924)
- Cooper, J. F. – The Deerslayer (Charles Scribner's Sons, New York, 1925)
- Parkman, F. – The Oregon Trail (Little Brown, 1925)
- Verne, J. – Michael Strogoff (Charles Scribner's Sons, New York, 1927)
- Boyd, J. – Drums (Charles Scribner's Sons, New York, 1928)
- Homer – The Odyssey (Houghton, 1929)
- Rollins, P. A. – Jinglebob (Charles Scribner's Sons, New York, 1930)
- ____ The Parables of Jesus (David McKay, Philadelphia, 1931)
- Fox, J. W. – The Little Shepherd of Kingdom Come (Charles Scribner's Sons, New York, 1931)
- Thoreau, H. D. – Men of Concord (Houghton Mifflin, 1936)
- Jackson, H. M. H. – Ramona (Little Brown, 1939)
- Rawlings, M. K. – The Yearling (Charles Scribner's Sons, New York, 1939)

== Other works ==
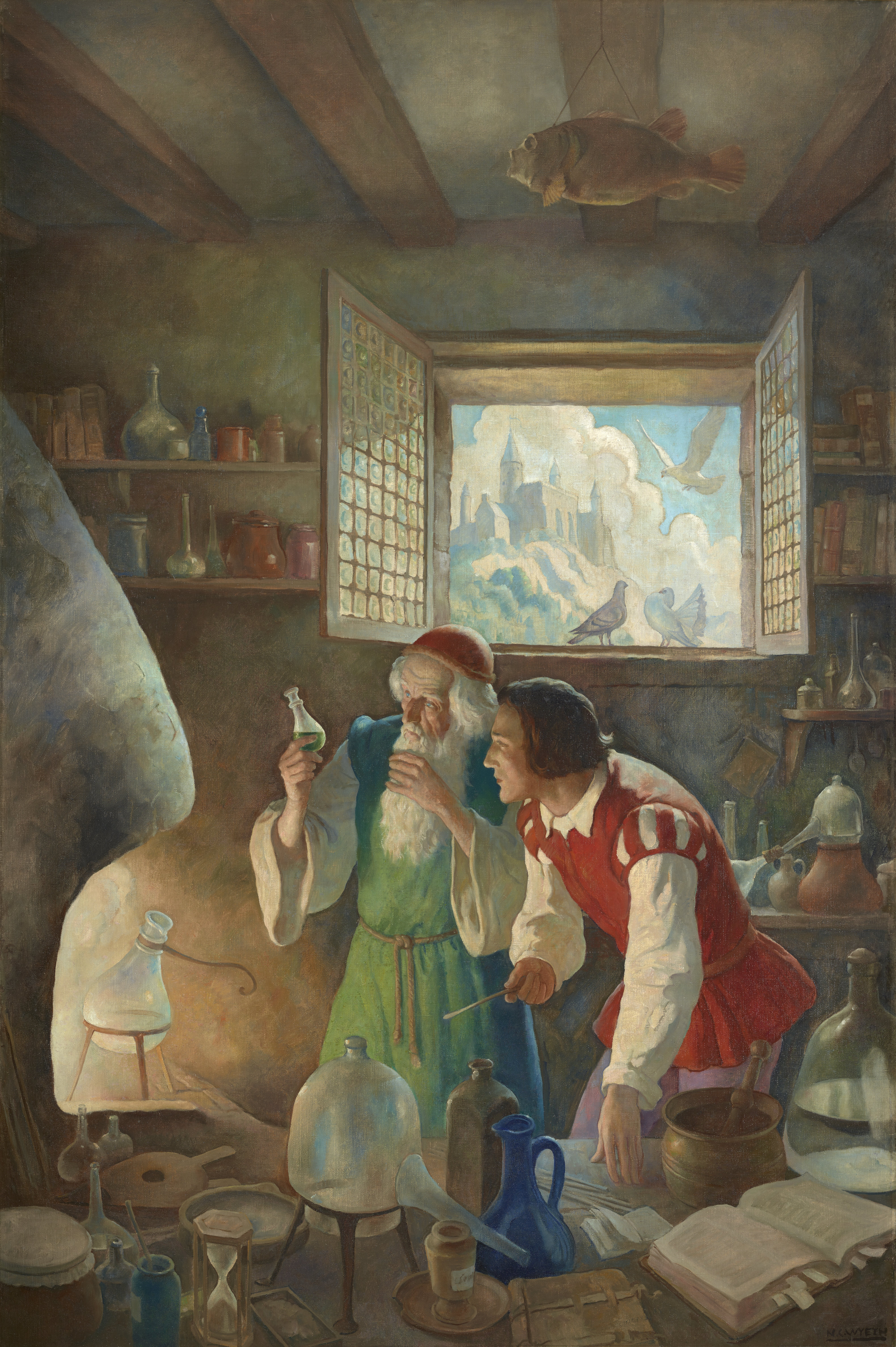
The Alchemist N. C. Wyeth 1937

- Mowing (1907)
- Long John Silver and Hawkins (1911)
- The Long Roll (1911)
- The Great Train Robbery (1912)
- Cease Firing (1912)
- The Sampo: A Wonder Tale of the North (1912)
- The Fence Builders (1915)
- The Mysterious Stranger (1916)
- The Scottish Chiefs (1921) by Jane Porter (originally published 1809)
- Stand and Deliver (1921)
- Rip Van Winkle (1921)
- The Giant (1922)
- Drums (1925, reissued in 1928 and 1953) a book by James Boyd with illustrations by N. C. Wyeth OCLC 246805249 and OCLC 485435631
- The Deerslayer (Scribners, 1925, reissued in 1929) by James Fenimore Cooper (originally published 1841) OCLC 1301654
- Reception to Washington on April 21, 1789, at Trenton on his way to New York to Assume the Duties of the Presidency of the United States (1930), a 17-foot by 12-foot painting
- Apotheosis of the Family (1932): a 60-foot-by-19-foot mural including likenesses of members of the Wyeth family, located in a building in downtown Wilmington, Delaware
- Dying Winter (1934)
- Men of Concord and some others as portrayed in the Journal of Henry David Thoreau (1936), a book edited by Francis H. Allen, with illustrations by N.C. Wyeth OCLC 275651
- The Alchemist (1937)
- They Took Their Wives with Them on Their Cruises (1938)
- Deep Cove Lobsterman (1939)
- The War Letter (1944)
- Nightfall (1945)
- The Homecoming (1945)

== Gallery ==
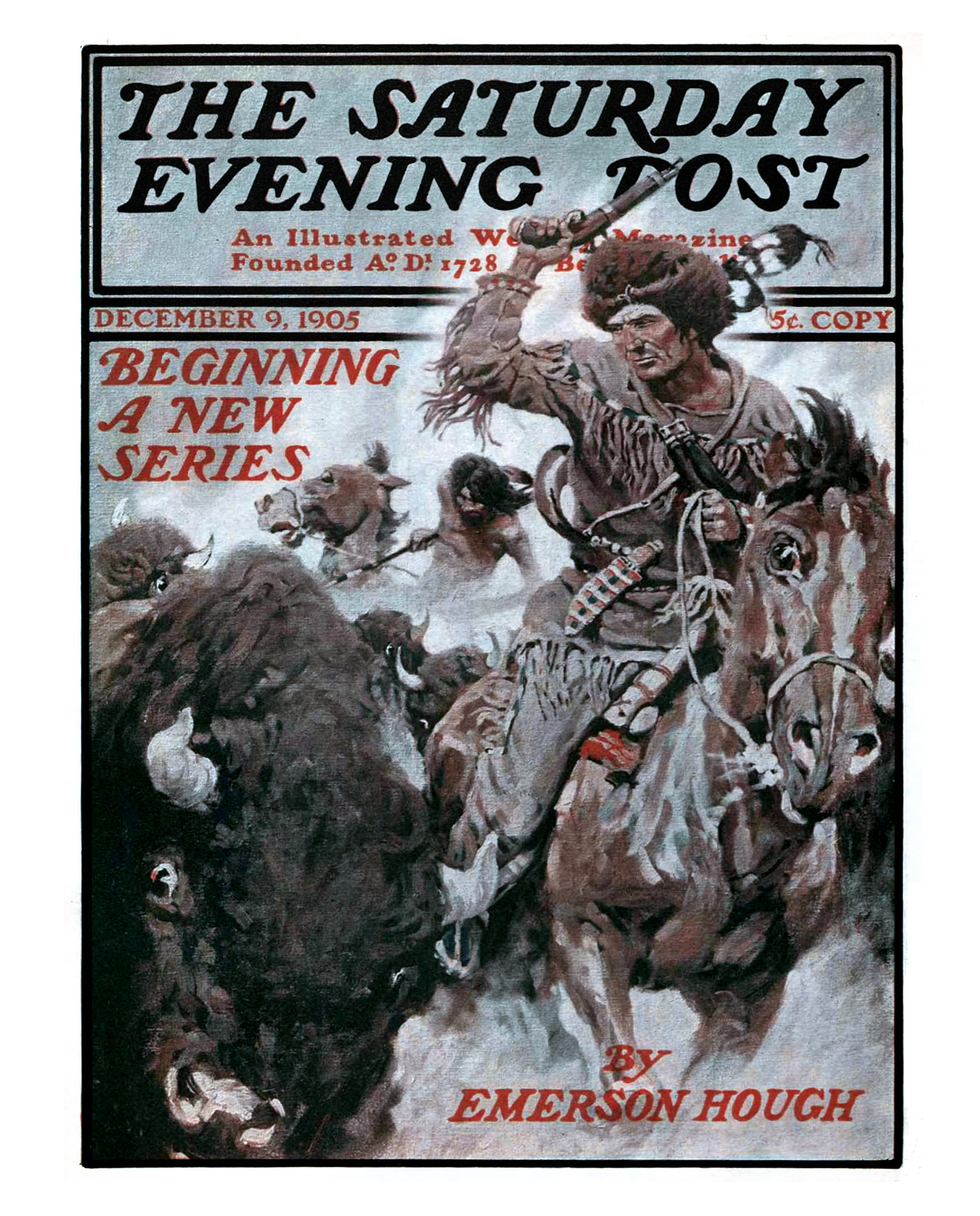
The Saturday Evening Post, cover illustration, December 9, 1905

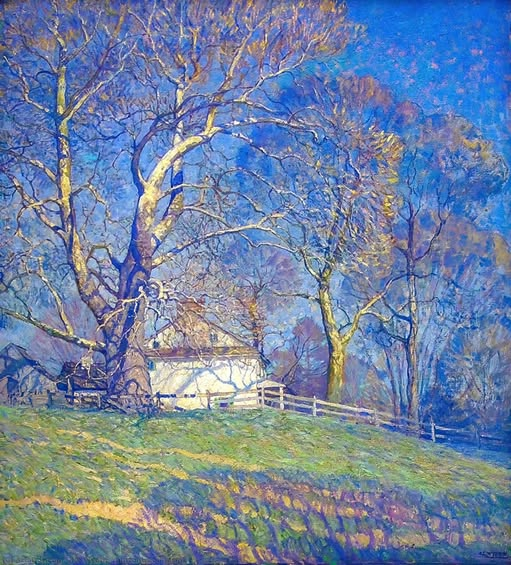
Buttonwood Farm, Early Spring, 1920

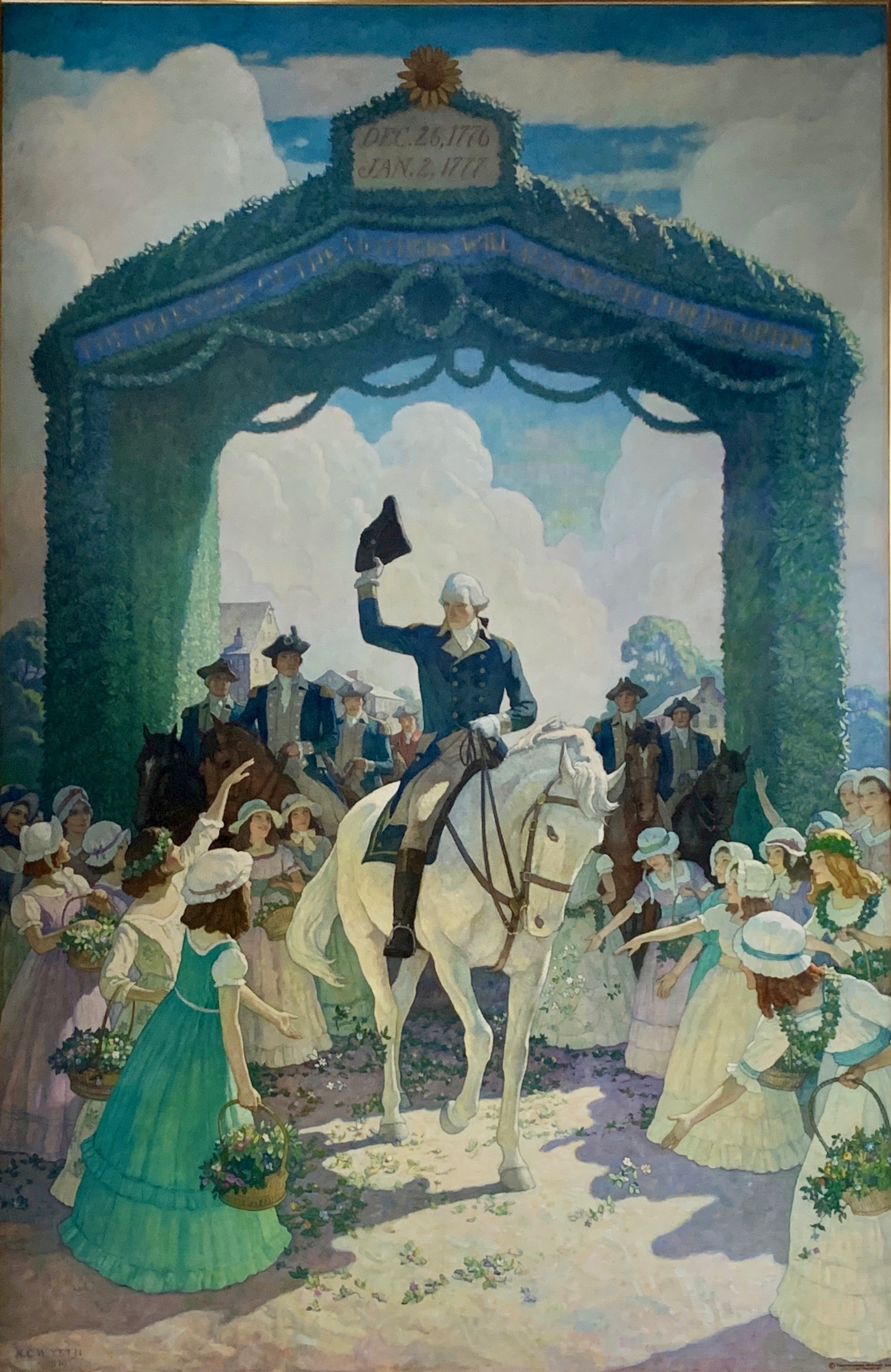
Reception to Washington on April 21, 1789 portraying George Washington's reception at Trenton, 1930

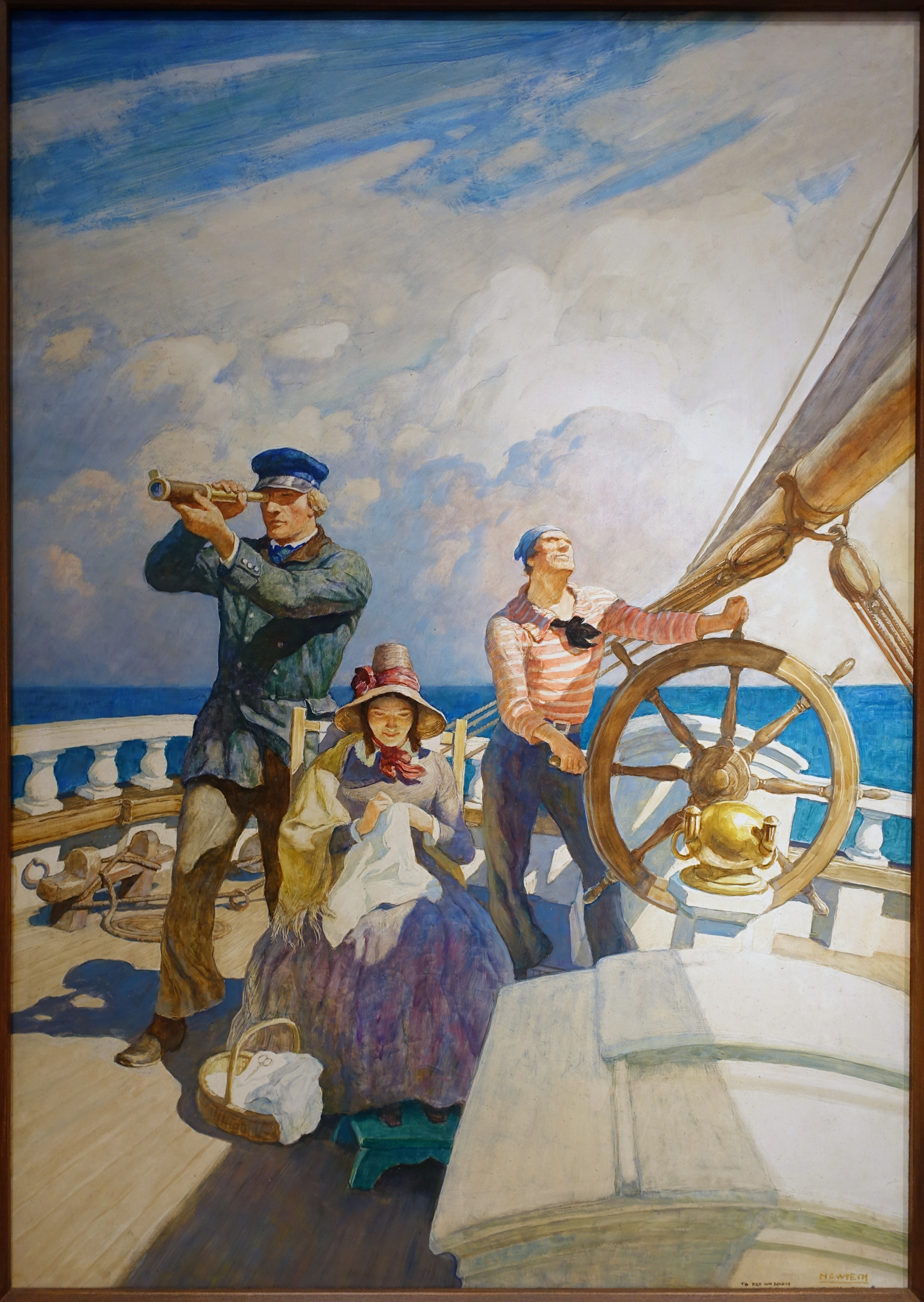
They Took Their Wives with Them on Their Cruises, c. 1938

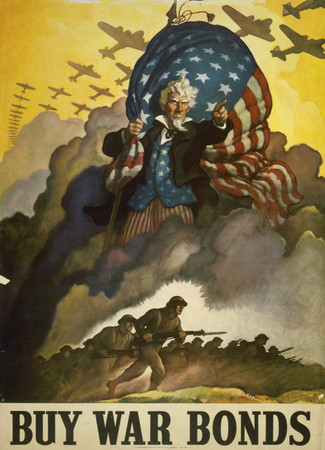
Fighting Uncle Sam, 1942 US Treasury poster

== See also ==
- Brandywine School
- National Museum of American Illustration
- Wyeth
