= San Patricio, New Mexico =

Unincorporated community in New Mexico, United States

- Unincorporated community
- Location within New Mexico Location within the United States
- Coordinates: 33°24′32″N 105°19′37″W
- Country: United States
- State: New Mexico
- County: Lincoln
- Time zone: UTC-7 (Mountain (MST))
  - Summer (DST): UTC-6 (MDT)
- ZIP codes: 88348
- Area code: 575

San Patricio is a small community in Lincoln County, New Mexico, United States. It is located along the Rio Ruidoso and U.S. Highway 70, between the communities of Hondo and Glencoe. It is just east of the Lincoln National Forest.

The community is the site of San Patricio Retreat Center, a Benedictine spirituality center recently purchased by the Diocese of Las Cruces, New Mexico. The Hurd-LaRinconada Gallery, owned by artist Michael Hurd, is located here. The gallery displays original works of art by the Wyeth and Hurd families and there are guest houses on the ranch.

== History ==
In the 1850s, Hispanic settlers moved to the area, which caused conflict with the native Apache. According to an interview with Frank Coe, these settlers lived in placitas, or "adobe family compounds enclosed for defensive purposes." Some still survive in the 21st century. Historic documents collected by the New Mexico Department of Transportation note:

In his book Frontier Fighter, George Coe describes the late 1800s houses in San Patricio as being "built for defense with thick adobe walls and portholes on top." Robery Utley's book High Noon in Lincoln describes San Patricio in the 1870s as made up of "some 15 adobe buildings scattered along a single street."

In the following decades, European-American settlers began to move here as well. The town was estimated to have about 40 families in 1867. That year the first acequia in the Hondo Valley was dug in San Patricio.

Around 1870, the town was named Ruidoso after the nearby river. Several years later it was renamed after a Catholic church built here: La Iglesia de San Patricio. This church, also known as the San Patricio Catholic Church, was the first church in the area. It became an important cultural center for the residents. Similar churches of this type are found throughout the Hondo Valley.

San Patricio was the site of a battle in the Lincoln County War. It was associated with Billy the Kid, who attended dances in town during the 1870s. In 1878, James Dolan and his allies, including the Rio Grande Posse, vandalized the town and stole and killed horses.

By the 1920s, the population grew to 822. Artists Peter Hurd and his wife Henriette Wyeth moved to the area in the 1930s, starting a farm of 40 acres. They were the first among numerous artists to live in the area and eventually had a 2200-acre ranch.

During World War II the population declined. Postwar development followed highway construction, and businesses moved to follow the changing path of U.S. Route 70.

In 1967, St. Jude's Church was built, consolidating the congregations of all nearby Catholic churches in the Hondo Valley.

== Geography ==
The coordinates of San Patricio are 33°24′32″N 105°19′37″W (33.408976, -105.326928).

The elevation is 5436 feet (1657 m).

San Patricio is located near the confluence of Rio Ruidoso and Rio Bonito. Glencoe is to the west and Hondo to the east. After their confluence, the rivers become the Rio Hondo.

== Demographics ==
The Catholic community in Glencoe attends St. Jude's Church in San Patricio. This church incorporated the bells from the historical Glencoe and Hondo Catholic churches, and San Patricio Church.

== Economy ==
The community and region are known for growing apples; the orchards were a major part of the economy until the mid-1900s. Other orchard fruits, like peaches, pears, and cherries, and more general agricultural products were also sold to truckers along with the apples.

Floods in 1941 and 1965, and the threat of cold weather have been the main dangers to these orchards. Early businesses of San Patricio included a general store, a grocery shop, a bar, a pool hall, a post office, and a gas station. In the early 2000s, only the post office is still operating.

== Education ==
San Patricio built its first school before 1880. The school district included 70 students in 1880 and 153 in 1920. The four-room elementary school closed in 1960 after the smaller school districts in the area consolidated to Hondo's elementary school.

== Infrastructure ==
U.S. Route 70 serves the town, which is a 16.5 mile drive from Sierra Blanca Regional Airport.
