= Henriette Wyeth =

American painter (1907–1997)

- Born: October 22, 1907; Wilmington, Delaware
- Died: April 3, 1997 (aged 89); Roswell, New Mexico
- Education: N.C. Wyeth; Pennsylvania Academy of Fine Arts
- Known for: Painting
- Spouse: Peter Hurd
- Father: N. C. Wyeth

Henriette Wyeth Hurd (October 22, 1907 – April 3, 1997) was an American artist noted for her portraits and still life paintings. The eldest daughter of illustrator N.C. Wyeth, she studied painting with her father and brother Andrew Wyeth at their home and studio in Chadds Ford, Pennsylvania.

After she and artist Peter Hurd married, they moved to San Patricio, New Mexico, in the mid-1930s and raised their three children on a ranch there. They were both inspired by the landscape and eventually had a 2200-acre ranch. One of her well-known quotes is: "I don't know what is important and what is unimportant, so I call it all immensely important."

== Early life ==
Henriette Wyeth was born in Wilmington, Delaware, into an artistic family. Wyeth was the eldest of the five children of noted illustrator N.C. Wyeth and his wife Carolyn Bockius. Her siblings Carolyn and Andrew also became artists, and all three studied with their father. Andrew Wyeth became the most well-known artist of this family.

Henriette contracted polio at the age of three, which altered her health and use of her right hand. As a result, she learned to draw with her left hand and paint with her right. She grew up on the family farm in Chadds Ford, Pennsylvania, and attended local Quaker schools. She and her siblings were eventually homeschooled because their father distrusted the public school system. She began formal art lessons with her father at the age of 11, making charcoal studies and geometric shapes.

== Artistic career ==
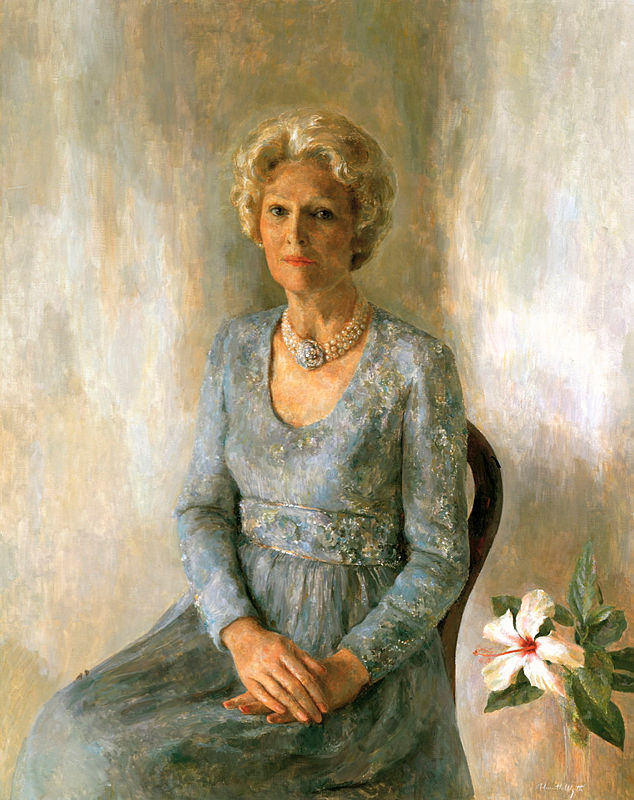
Portrait of Patricia Ryan Nixon (1978) by Henriette Wyeth, the White House, Washington, D.C.

A child prodigy, at the age of 13 Wyeth was enrolled in the Normal Arts School in Boston, Massachusetts. The next year, in 1921, she entered the Boston Museum of Art Academy. Two years later she moved to Philadelphia to study painting at the Pennsylvania Academy of Fine Arts. By the age of 16, she was well known as a portraitist and received commissions for paintings of Wilmington residents. Deeply influenced by her father's unique realistic style, she rejected early 20th-century painting styles such as Impressionism and Cubism. She was also socially and politically conservative. As a result, later in life she rejected the progressive movements of the 1960s and 1970s, including the women's movement. She often criticized television and modern culture.

Soon after her student years, Hurd exhibited at the Pennsylvania Academy (1927, 1936–44), where she was awarded the 1937 Mary Smith Prize for a portrait of her son Peter. Wyeth's work spanned portraits of adults and children, still lifes, and floral landscapes. In her work, she "often included objects that related to the subject's interest or personality". She eventually stopped painting children because, as she said, "today's children--they are so deadpan."

She painted for Helen Hayes, Paulette Goddard, and Mrs. John D. Rockefeller III (Blanchette Hooker Rockefeller), for which she earned a lasting celebrity. In 1963, she painted a portrait of her brother Andrew for the cover of Time magazine. Hurd and Wyeth were both commissioned to produce a cover portrait of President Lyndon B. Johnson for Time's "Man of the Year" issue. She received awards for her work, including the Governor's Award in New Mexico and a Living Legacy Award from the Women's International Center.

Her most widely known work is the official White House portrait of First Lady Pat Nixon.

== Personal life ==
At the age of 21, in 1929 Wyeth married artist Peter Hurd, a fellow student at the Pennsylvania Academy and her father's apprentice. The couple had three children together: Peter Jr., Carolyn, and Michael Hurd. In the mid-1930s they moved to San Patricio, New Mexico, settling on a farm of 40 acres. By 1939, they established the Sentinel Ranch there, gradually acquiring more land until they had 2200 acres. It was in southern New Mexico near Roswell, New Mexico, her husband's birthplace.

Wyeth's father was not happy when they left the Pennsylvania area. As she said in a 1989 interview, "He felt I should not let marriage interfere with my painting" and worried that living on a ranch would draw her energy from it. Henriette Wyeth, however, did continue to paint for the rest of her life and was inspired by the landscape. Later health problems prevented her from making art. She criticized contemporary television and feminism, and said that modern society had "blunted" children.

== Death ==
Henriette Wyeth died in her Roswell, New Mexico home-studio from complications from pneumonia in April 1997.

== Legacy ==
According to her biography on the Wyeth Hurd Gallery website, she was "considered by many art scholars to be one of the great women painters of the 20th century". Her papers, and those of her husband (who died in 1984), are in the Archives of American Art at the Smithsonian Institution.

== Exhibitions ==
Portrait of Peter Wyeth Hurd (1937) by Henriette Wyeth, El Paso Museum of Art, El Paso, Texas.

Much of her work is held by the Roswell Museum and Art Center, in Roswell and at the Hurd La Rinconada Gallery in San Patricio, both in New Mexico. Her paintings can also be found in the permanent collections of the Brandywine River Museum in Pennsylvania, the Los Angeles Athletic Club, the National Portrait Gallery, the New Mexico Museum of Art in Santa Fe, and the Texas Tech University Fine Art Museum. Wyeth's work has also been exhibited at such notable institution as the Metropolitan Museum of Art in New York, the Carnegie Institute in Pittsburgh, the Art Institute of Chicago and New Mexico's Roswell Museum of Art.

Other exhibitions have included:

- The Wyeth Family (1935), Philadelphia, Pennsylvania
- Exhibition of Paintings by Peter Hurd & Henriette Wyeth (1967), the Columbus Gallery of Fine Arts, Columbus, Ohio

Her work has also been included in a number of posthumous exhibitions:

- The Wyeths' Wyeths (2010), Farnsworth Art Museum, Rockland, Maine
- The Wyeth Family: Three Generations of American Art (2010), Dulwich Picture Gallery, London
- The Wyeths: America's Artists (2011), Kalamazoo Institute of the Arts, Kalamazoo, Michigan
- Nomads: Traversing Adolescence (2013), Kemper Museum of Contemporary Art, Kansas City, Kansas, and Kemper East, Kansas City, Missouri
- Magical & Real: Henriette Wyeth and Peter Hurd, a Retrospective (2018), Michener Art Museum, Doylestown, Pennsylvania

== See also ==
- Wyeth
