= N. C. Wyeth House and Studio =

Historic house in Pennsylvania, United States

- U.S. National Register of Historic Places
- U.S. National Historic Landmark District
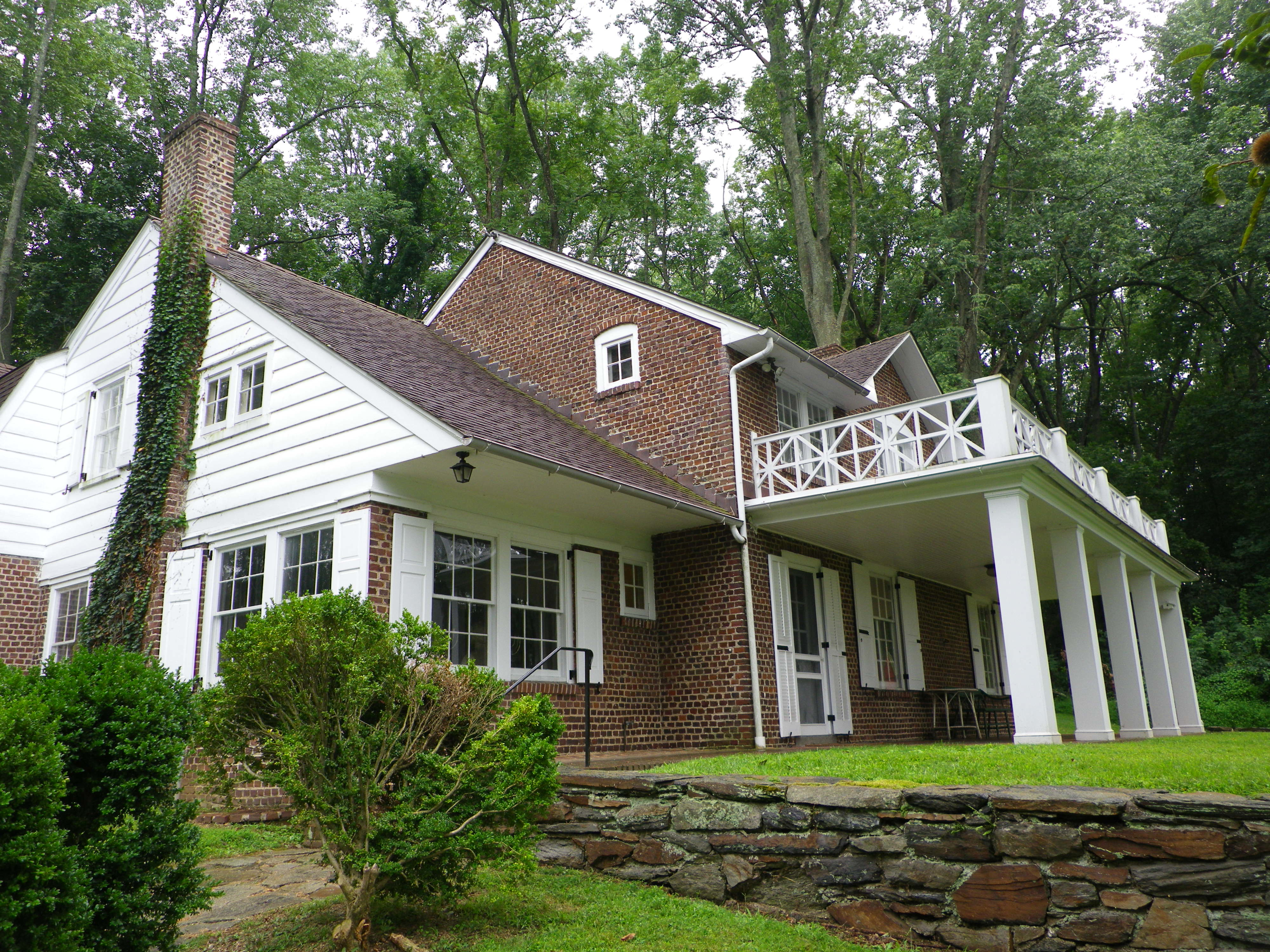
- Wyeth House in 2010

- Location within Pennsylvania Location within the United States
- Location: Murphy Road; Chadds Ford Township, Pennsylvania, United States
- Coordinates: 39°51′54″N 75°34′42″W
- Area: 18 acres (7.3 ha)
- Built: 1911
- Architect: William D. Brincklé; et al.
- Architectural style: Colonial Revival
- NRHP reference No.: 97001680

Significant dates
- Added to NRHP: December 9, 1997
- Designated NHLD: December 9, 1997

The N. C. Wyeth House and Studio is a historic house museum and artist's studio on Murphy Road in Chadds Ford Township, Pennsylvania, United States. Beginning with its construction in 1911, it served as the principal home and studio of artist N.C. Wyeth (1882–1945). It was restored to its original appearance around the time of his death. The property is managed by the Brandywine River Museum, which offers tours. It was designated a National Historic Landmark District in 1997.

== Description and history ==
The Wyeth House and Studio are located in a rural-residential area southeast of the village center of Chadds Ford, on the south side of Murphy Road. Set on about 18 acres (7.3 ha) of land are the main house, art studio, barn, and pump house. The property is bounded on the north by Murphy Road and the south by Brandywine Creek. The house is set on a ridge that is part of the Brandywine Battlefield area, having been occupied by Continental Army troops during the 1777 Battle of Brandywine. The house is a two-story Colonial Revival structure, designed for Wyeth by William Draper Brinkle and built in 1911. It was enlarged in 1926 to provide additional space for Wyeth's growing family. The studio is a large L-shaped single-story structure, built in stages in 1911, 1923, and 1931. The main studio space is distinguished by a large north-facing Palladian window.

N.C. Wyeth was renowned as one of the leading illustrators of the first half of the 20th century, his works appearing in Harper's, Scribner's, McClure's, and the Saturday Evening Post. Wyeth drew much inspiration from the landscape around this property, which influenced many of his rural landscape works. He purchased this property with funds made from his first major commission, a series of illustrations for an edition of Robert Louis Stevenson's Treasure Island.

After Wyeth died in 1945, his wife lived in the house until 1973, after which their daughter, Carolyn Wyeth, lived there and painted in the studio until her death in 1994. The Brandywine River Museum then took possession of the property and began restoration. It has been restored to its state as of 1945, and includes paintings left unfinished by Wyeth at the time of his death, and family artifacts that never left the property.

In 2012, N.C. Wyeth's studio was opened to the public for the first time since his death. The museum now offers guided tours of the property. Accessibility was further increased in 2017 with the opening of new walking trails between Potts Meadow, the Andrew Wyeth Studio, and the N.C. Wyeth House and Studio.

== See also ==
- List of National Historic Landmarks in Pennsylvania
- National Register of Historic Places listings in Delaware County, Pennsylvania
