= Chadds Ford Township, Pennsylvania =

Township in Pennsylvania, US

- Township
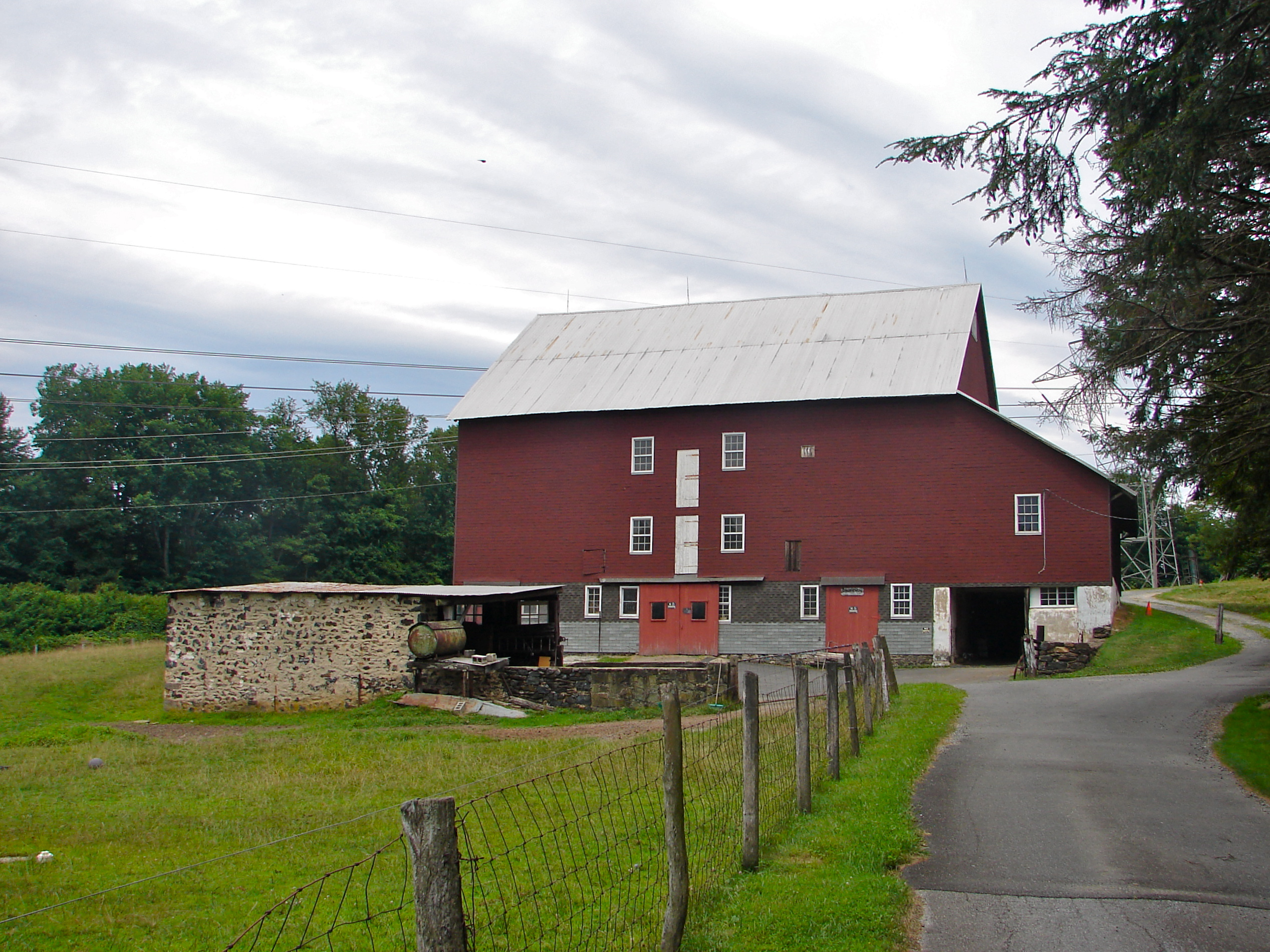
- Kuerner Farm in Chadds Ford Township in July 2011

- Flag Logo

- Location of Chadds Ford Township in Delaware County, Pennsylvania (top) and of Delaware County in Pennsylvania (bottom)

- Location of Chadds Ford Township in Pennsylvania
- Coordinates: 39°52′29″N 75°33′15″W
- Country: United States
- State: Pennsylvania
- County: Delaware

Area
  - Total: 8.72 sq mi (22.59 km^{2})
  - Land: 8.66 sq mi (22.43 km^{2})
  - Water: 0.062 sq mi (0.16 km^{2})
- Elevation: 315 ft (96 m)

Population (2020)
  - Total: 3,972
  - Density: 459/sq mi (177.1/km^{2})
- Time zone: UTC-5 (EST)
  - Summer (DST): UTC-4 (EDT)
- ZIP Code: 19317
- Area codes: 610 and 484
- FIPS code: 42-045-12442
- GNIS feature ID: 1216378
- Website: www.chaddsfordpa.gov

Chadds Ford Township (/tʃædsfɔːrd/ Chadds-ford, alternatively /tʃædsfərd/ Chadds-furd) is an affluent township in Delaware County, Pennsylvania, United States. It is located about 25 miles (40 km) southwest of Philadelphia. Prior to 1996, Chadds Ford Township was known as Birmingham Township; the name was changed to allow the township to correspond to both its census-designated place and to distinguish itself from the adjacent Birmingham Township in Chester County. As of the 2020 census, Chadds Ford Township had a population of 3,972, up from 3,640 at the 2010 census.

Chadds Ford was home to N. C. Wyeth, his son Andrew Wyeth, his daughter Ann Wyeth McCoy, and his grandson Jamie Wyeth. Brandywine Battlefield, the site of the Battle of Brandywine during the American Revolutionary War, is located in the township, along with Brandywine River Museum, which houses much of the Wyeth collection.

Chadds Ford is also known for their annual pancake flipping competition, held on March 14th, 5:00 P.M., at the Brandywine River Museum of Art. Dates have been moved, such as March 17th, 2022 and March 1st, 2007. All pancakes that have been made during the event are repurposed in a free pancake buffet at the end of the event along with a cultural cheese tasting booth.

== History ==
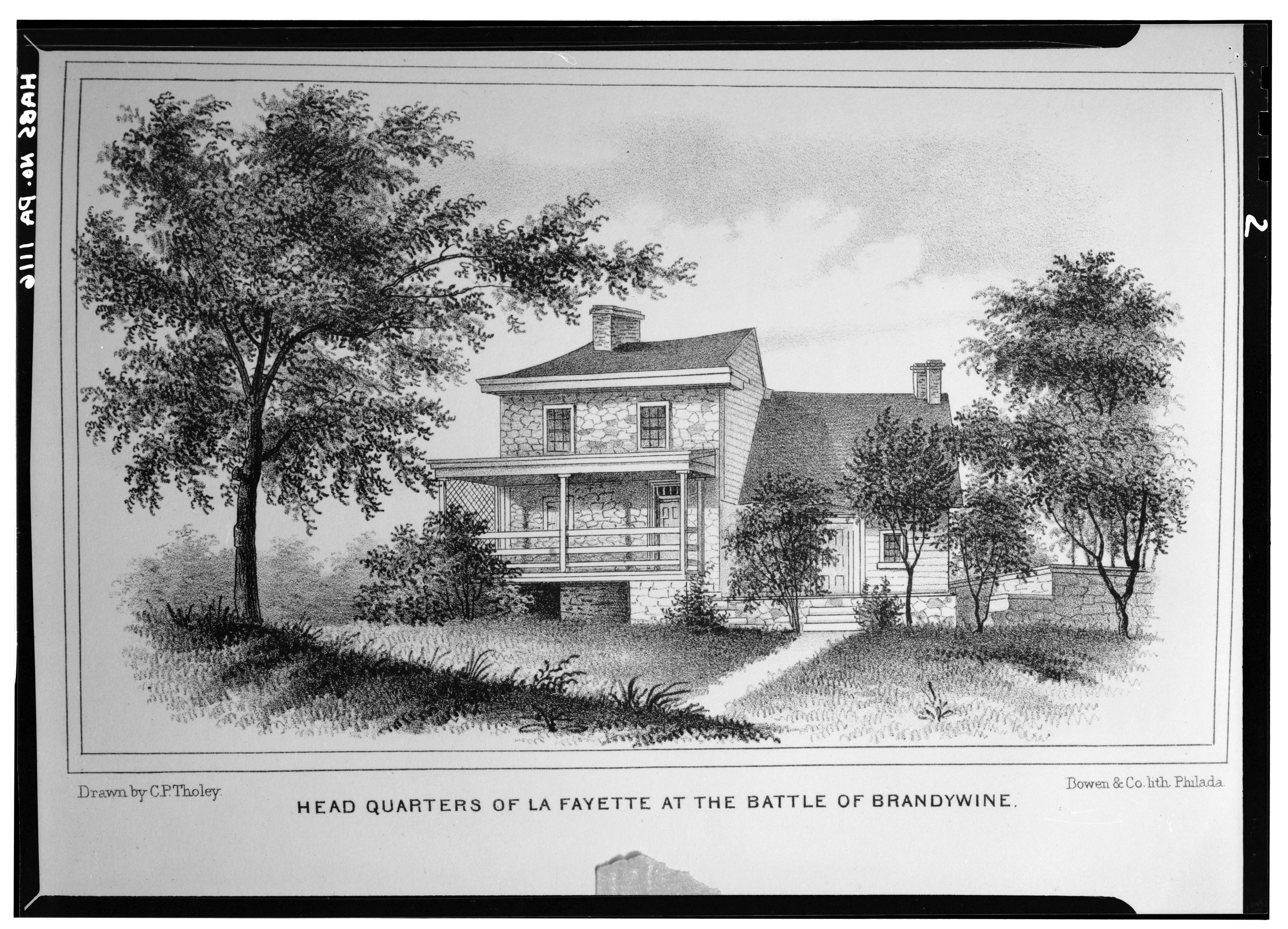
An Historic American Buildings Survey, including Chadds Ford

The township's original name was Birmingham, which was given to it by William Brinton in remembrance of the town of the same name in England.

Francis Chadsey, or Chads, improperly spelled Chadd, emigrated from Wiltshire, England in 1689 and lived in Chichester Township until 1696 when his name first appeared in the Birmingham Township tax records.

On September 11, 1777, the house owned by George Gilpin was occupied by General Howe of the British Army during the Battle of Brandywine. The local significance of the battle is such that a 1940 guidebook noted that "a local barber displays a large sign: 'This is where Washington and Lafayette had a close shave.'"

The Chad House, Chadds Ford Historic District, Gilpin Homestead, and William Painter Farm are all listed on the National Register of Historic Places.

The Battle of Brandywine took place near Chadds Ford on September 11. General George Washington had positioned his forces in Chadds Ford shortly before and during the battle before having to reposition due to the British flank.

== Geography ==
The township is the westernmost in Delaware County and is bordered to the west by Chester County, to the south by the state of Delaware, and to the east by Concord Township. The southern border is part of the Twelve-Mile Circle border between Delaware and Pennsylvania. Brandywine Creek forms the western boundary of both the township and of Delaware County.

The village of Chadds Ford is in the northwestern part of the township, and a small piece of Dilworthtown is in the northern corner of the township.

According to the U.S. Census Bureau, the township has a total area of 8.7 square miles (22.6 km^{2}), of which 8.6 square miles (22.4 km^{2}) is land and 0.1 square miles (0.2 km^{2}), or 0.70%, is water.

=== Climate ===
The climate in this area is characterized by hot, humid summers and generally cool to cold winters. According to the Köppen Climate Classification system, Chadds Ford Township is in a transitional zone betweenf the humid subtropical and humid continental climatic zones. Of these two climate zones, Chadds Ford has much more in common with the humid continental climate. The hardiness zone is 7a except near the Brandywine Creek where it is 7b. Average monthly temperatures in the village center of Chadds Ford range from 31.5 °F in January to 75.9 °F in July.

== Demographics ==
Historical population
| Census | Pop. | Note | %± |
|---|---|---|---|
| 1930 | 718 | | — |
| 1940 | 805 | | 12.1% |
| 1950 | 836 | | 3.9% |
| 1960 | 1,093 | | 30.7% |
| 1970 | 1,281 | | 17.2% |
| 1980 | 2,057 | | 60.6% |
| 1990 | 3,118 | | 51.6% |
| 2000 | 3,170 | | 1.7% |
| 2010 | 3,640 | | 14.8% |
| 2020 | 3,972 | | 9.1% |

As of 2010 census, the racial makeup of the township was 89.4% White, 1.4% African American, 0.0% Native American, 7.6% Asian, 0.5% from other races, and 1.1% from two or more races. Hispanic or Latino of any race were 2.9% of the population .

== Education ==
Chadds Ford Township is located in the Unionville-Chadds Ford School District and public school students attend the district's schools. High school students attend Unionville High School in Kennett Square.

Rachel Kohl Library serves Chadds Ford Township.

== Points of interest ==
- Brandywine Battlefield Park
- Brandywine River Museum
  - N. C. Wyeth House and Studio
  - "The Mills", Andrew Wyeth home and studio
  - Kuerner Farm
- Brandywine Wildflower and Native Plant Gardens
- Chad House
- Chadds Ford Historic District
- Christian C. Sanderson Museum
- Gilpin Homestead
- William Painter Farm
- Twaddell's Mill and House

== Transportation ==
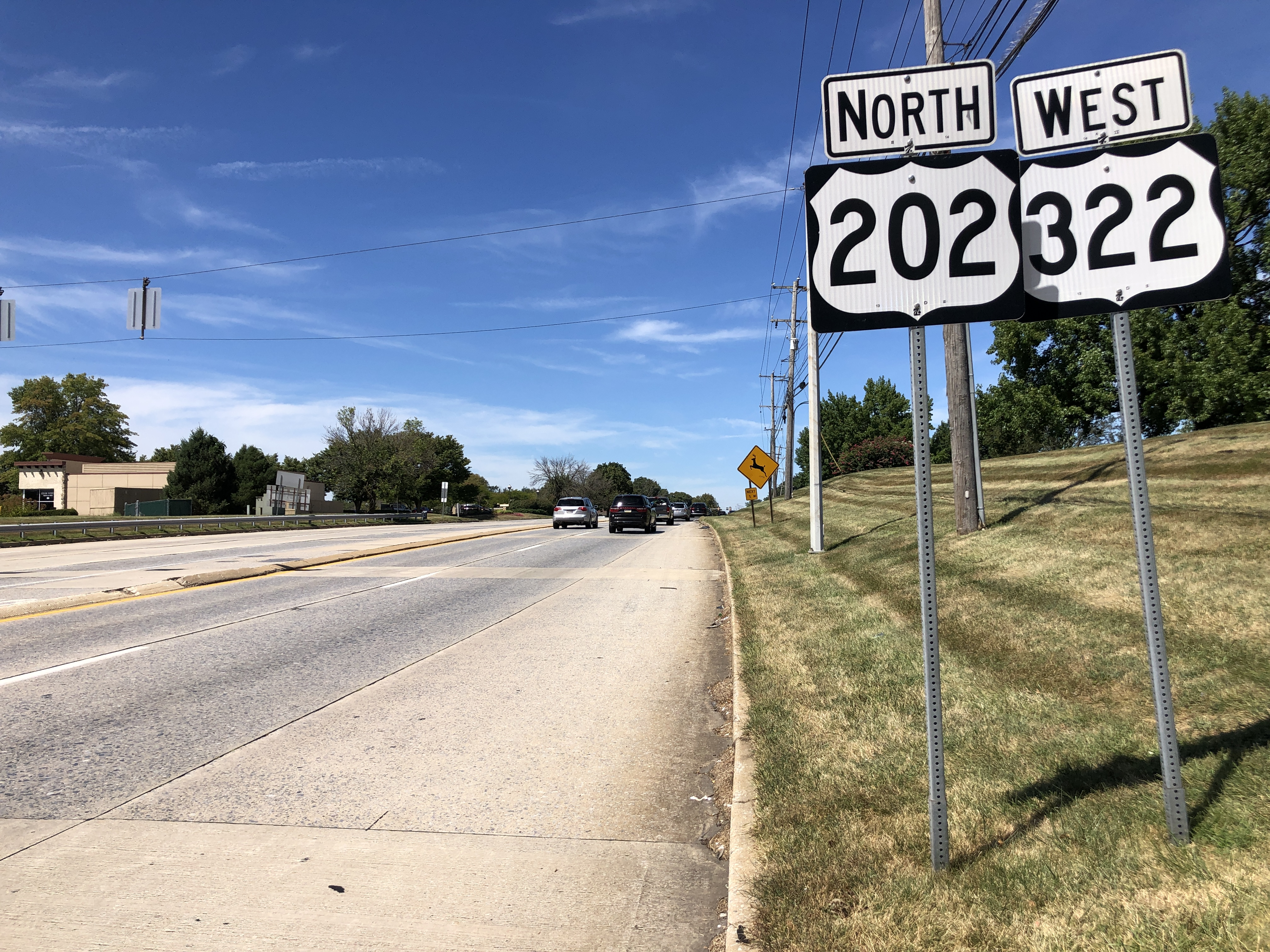
US Route 202 northbound and 322 westbound along the northeast edge of Chadds Ford Township

As of 2020, there were 31.02 miles (49.92 km) of public roads in Chadds Ford Township, of which 17.67 miles (28.44 km) were maintained by Pennsylvania Department of Transportation (PennDOT) and 13.35 miles (21.48 km) were maintained by the township.

U.S. Route 1 (Baltimore Pike) runs through the northern part of the township and intersects U.S. Routes 202 and 322 at Painters Crossroads on the township's eastern border. US 1 leads southwest toward Maryland, while US 202 leads south to Wilmington, Delaware, and US 322 leads east to Chester. US 202 and 322 together lead north to West Chester.

== Notable people ==
- Bill Bergey, American football player
- Weldon Brinton Heyburn, U.S. Senator
- Erin Matson, field hockey coach
- Ann Wyeth McCoy, composer
- Pat Meehan, U.S. Representative
- Robin Toner, journalist
- Andrew Wyeth, artist
- Jamie Wyeth, artist
- N.C. Wyeth, artist
