= Anna Brelsford McCoy =

American painter

- Born: 1940 (age 85–86); United States
- Education: Tower Hill School in Wilmington, Delaware; Bennett College in Millbrook, New York; Pennsylvania Academy of Fine Arts
- Occupation: Artist
- Spouse(s): George Alexis Weymouth; Divorced in 1979 after 18 years
- Children: Mac (adopted)
- Parent(s): John W. McCoy and Ann Wyeth

Anna Brelsford McCoy (born 1940) is an American artist.

== Biography ==
McCoy's mother was Ann Wyeth McCoy, the youngest daughter of the illustrator N. C. Wyeth who was closely tied to the Brandywine School approach to art. Her father was John W. McCoy, a student of N. C. Wyeth and son of a vice president of the DuPont Company. When McCoy was still a child, she decided she wanted to be a portrait artist. McCoy began studying art with her aunt, Carolyn Wyeth, at the age of fourteen. She also studied with Charles Vinson. Her uncle Andrew Wyeth and his son and her cousin, Jamie, loomed large in the School.

McCoy graduated from Bennett College in 1960 with a bachelor of arts degree. Instead of attending the Pennsylvania Academy of Fine Arts, she got married. She married Frolic Weymouth and they stayed married for 18 years until their divorce in 1979. Her active painting paused during her marriage.

McCoy is the author of the book, John W. McCoy, American Painter. McCoy lives in Chadds Ford, Pennsylvania and "paints what she likes." She also spends time in Maine. She is known for her portrait work, as well as landscapes and still lifes.
