= Christian C. Sanderson =

American historian (1882–1966)

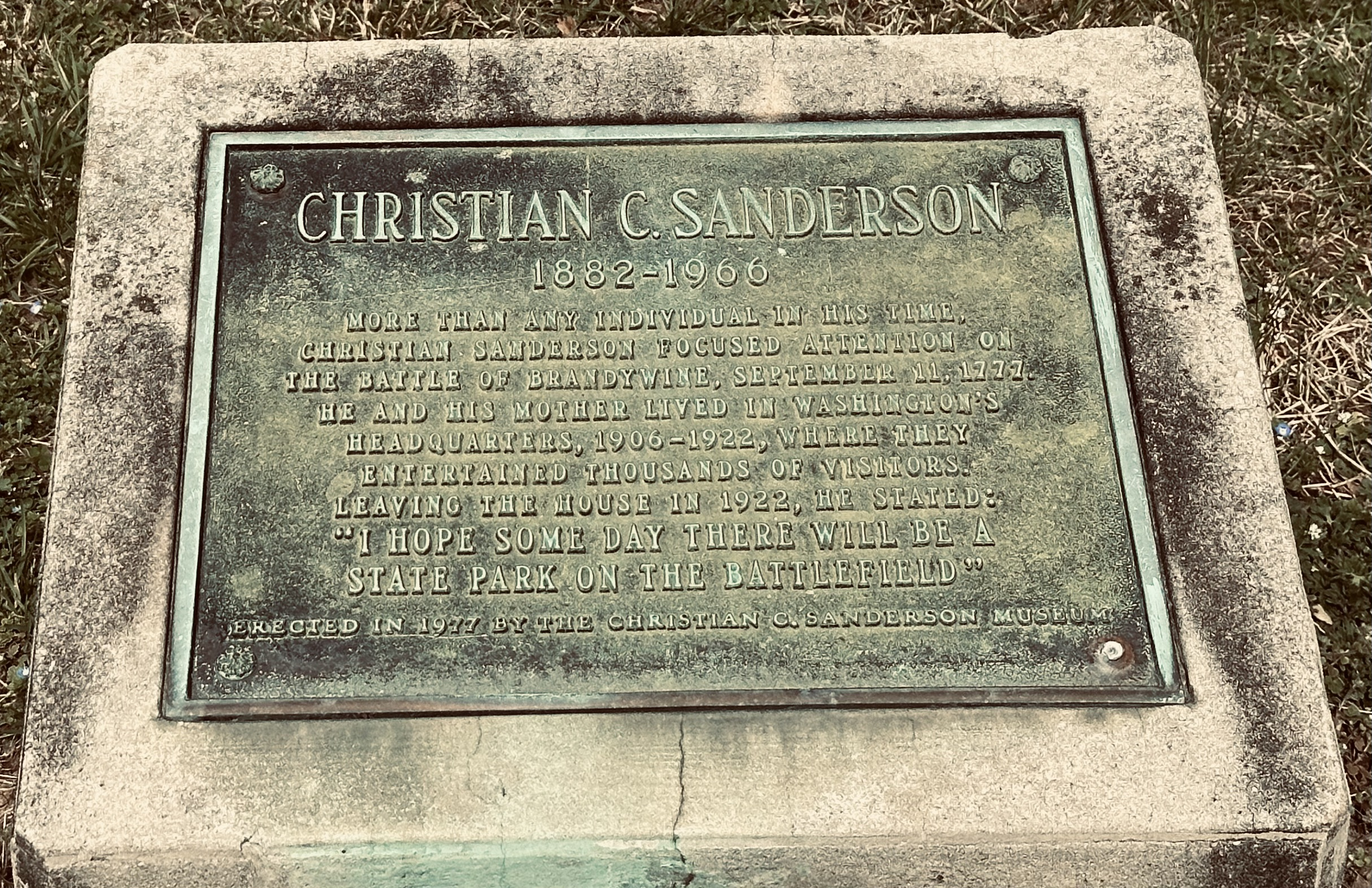
Commemorative plaque for Sanderson at the Battle of the Brandywine Park

Christian Carmack Sanderson (1882–1966) was a teacher, fiddler, square dance caller, poet, and noted local historian in southeastern Pennsylvania in the early to mid-20th century. He corresponded with a wide range of notable people of his time and was a remarkable collector of historical memorabilia (which are the basis of the collections on display in the Christian C. Sanderson Museum).

Sanderson lived the latter part of his life in Chadds Ford, Pennsylvania, and was friends with the Wyeth family there (including artists N.C., Andrew and Jamie). From 1906 to 1922, Sanderson lived in the Benjamin Ring House, which was Washington's Headquarters before and after the Battle of Brandywine and "more than any individual in his time, Christian Sanderson focused attention on the Battle".

Sanderson is the subject of a biography written by his friend Thomas R. Thompson. and a documentary film by Karen Kuder.

== See also ==
- Christian C. Sanderson Museum
