= George Alexis Weymouth =

American artist (1936–2016)

- Born: June 2, 1936; Wilmington, Delaware, U.S.
- Died: April 24, 2016 (aged 79); Chadds Ford, Pennsylvania, U.S.
- Other name: Frolic Weymouth
- Education: B.A. American Studies (1958)
- Alma mater: Yale University
- Occupations: Artist and Conservationist
- Spouse: Anna Brelsford McCoy (divorced 1979)
- Children: Mac
- Parent(s): George Tyler Weymouth and Dulcinea Ophelia Payne du Pont

George Alexis Weymouth (June 2, 1936 – April 24, 2016), better known as Frolic Weymouth, was an American artist, whip or stager, and conservationist. He served on the United States Commission of Fine Arts in the 1970s and was a member of the Du Pont family.

== Family and personal life ==
His mother, Dulcinea "Deo" Ophelia Payne du Pont (November 28, 1909 – February 8, 1981), was the eldest of Eugene Eleuthere du Pont's (August 27, 1882 – December 15, 1954) four daughters. Frolic was six generations removed from Éleuthère Irénée du Pont, the founder of the DuPont corporation. In 1930, Dulcinea married investment banker George T. Weymouth (December 14, 1904 – June 7, 1990).

Weymouth was christened George Alexis Weymouth. According to a well-known story, shortly after George's birth, his 3-year-old brother, Gene, lost his foxhound. After repeatedly asking his mother, "Where's Frolic?" his exasperated mother replied, "Shut up! Here's your damn Frolic!" and thrust George before Gene. The name stuck.

Weymouth graduated from St. Mark's School in Southborough, Massachusetts in 1954. He received his undergraduate degree in American studies from Yale University in 1958. Weymouth suffered from dyslexia, but he believed that being from a prominent family enabled him to graduate from Yale. "I couldn't read and write or spell. I still can't. I don't know anything but painting pictures and being on a horse," he said in 2007.

"It's no big deal" being a du Pont, he once said. In 2000, 3,700 members of the Du Pont family attended a reunion at Longwood Gardens. Several years later Weymouth wondered aloud, "How many there are now? Du Ponts have always been busy in bed."

Weymouth was married to Anna Brelsford McCoy for 18 years until their divorce in 1979. He has one son, Mac, whom he adopted.

He resided in a converted 17th-century Swedish trading post with an 18th-century addition on 250 acres (100 ha) called "Big Bend" (a translation of an Indian name for the land) in Chadds Ford, Pennsylvania, that he purchased in 1961. According to Weymouth, William Penn originally purchased the land from the Native American Lenape tribe in 1683. Big Bend was the Lenape's original term for the land, which lies along the Brandywine Creek. Other sources point to the land of Big Bend being the site of a Lenape village known as Queonemysing (place of the long fish). The chief Secetareus and his people of the Unami group, their totem the tortoise, of the Lenni-Lenape or Delawares, sold to William Penn the land between Chester Creek and Christina Creek (thus including Big Bend), December 19, 1688.

Weymouth died at the age of 79 on April 24, 2016, at his home in Chadds Ford. The announced cause of death was complications of congestive heart failure.

== Artist ==
Weymouth's early work, done in egg tempera, was often highly personal. His portrait of his grandfather, Eugene du Pont, Jr., features the detail of a herringbone suit coat and the worn fabric of a favorite recliner. His The Way Back (1963) is a self-portrait of only his hands guiding a single horse carriage up the lane to Big Bend.

Weymouth painted portraits of Luciano Pavarotti (1982) and of Prince Philip, Duke of Edinburgh (1995), Queen Elizabeth's husband, a work which hangs in Windsor Castle. Weymouth was selected by NASA to paint at Cape Canaveral during the moon shots.

Through his circle of fellow artists, Weymouth became a close friend and relation of artist Andrew Wyeth. He was married to artist Anna Brelsford McCoy, Andrew Wyeth's niece. They divorced in 1979. Jamie Wyeth, Andrew Wyeth's son, married Weymouth's cousin Phyllis.

Weymouth was the confidant who discreetly hid Andrew Wyeth's nudes of Prussian-born neighbor and caretaker Helga Testorf for 17 years before they became public. In the 2004 documentary, The Way Back: A Portrait of George A. Weymouth, Andrew Wyeth said he didn't "know of anyone who means as much to me."

He helped found the Brandywine River Museum, which presents the work of Andrew Wyeth, N.C. Wyeth, Jamie Wyeth, other Wyeth family members (including those such as Peter Hurd related by marriage) and selections from the canon of American art. Weymouth served on the Visual Arts Panel of the Pennsylvania Council of the Arts and received many awards, including the Cliveden Heritage Preservation Award and the University of Delaware Merit Award for Community Service. Weymouth was a member of the U.S. Commission of Fine Arts from 1972 to 1977.

In a conversation about Andy Warhol, Jamie Wyeth expressed the opinion that Frolic Weymouth was the "real character."

Weymouth surrounded himself with art and gardens. A centerpiece in Weymouth's Big Bend is "The Vidette," an enormous painting of a horseman in the snow dating from 1912. This N.C. Wyeth work is occasionally on loan for exhibitions. Anna Hyatt Huntington's "Greyhounds Playing" graces the garden. Elsewhere, a carved wooden Indonesian fertility bench features two interlocked monkeys, highlighting Weymouth's admitted fascination with fornication.

== Conservationist ==
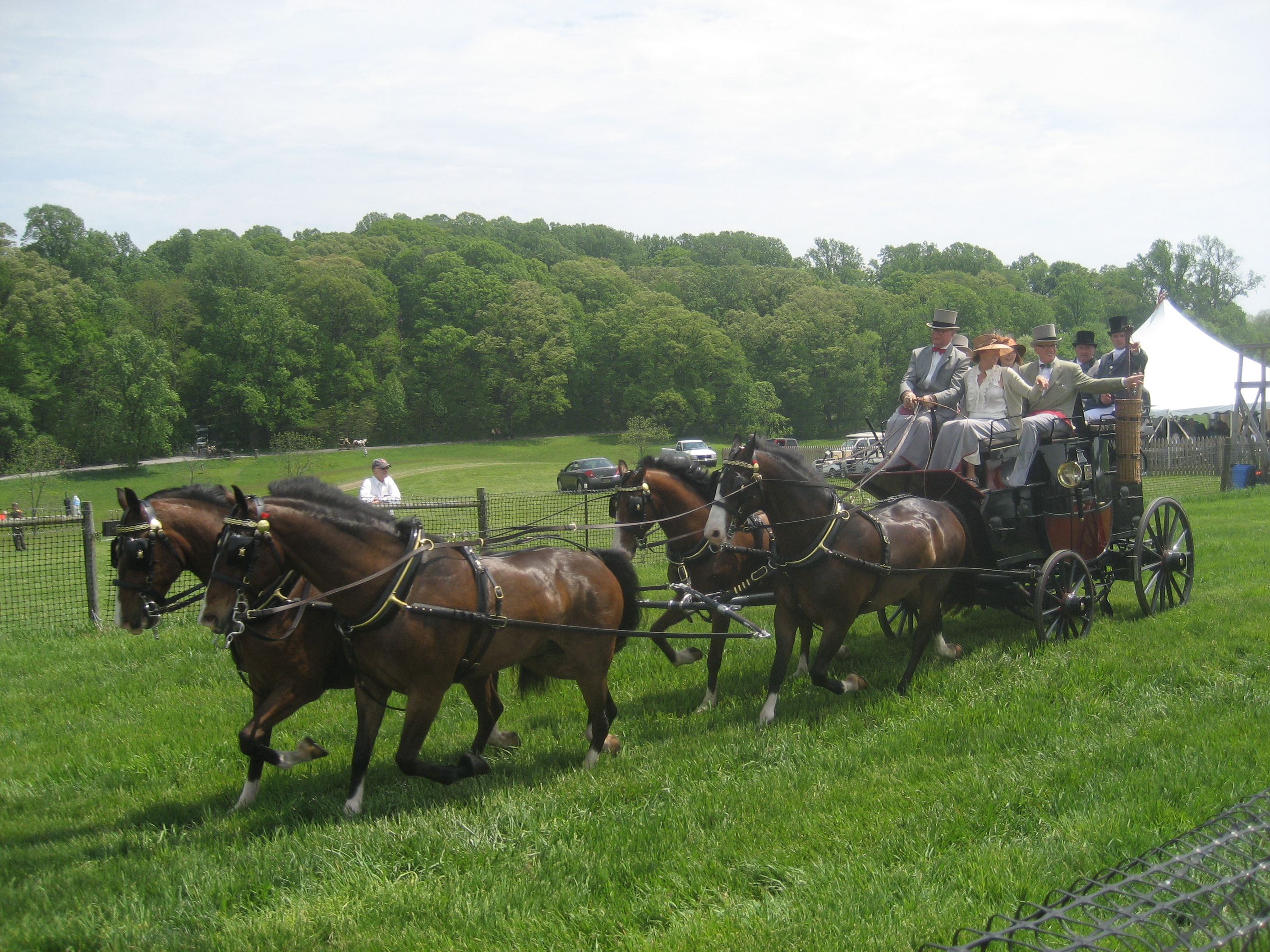
Frolic Weymouth driving his coach at the head of Winterthur's Point-to-Point carriage parade.

In the mid-1960s, Weymouth convinced friends F.I. du Pont and William Prickett to help him buy two parcels in Chadds Ford, along the banks of the Brandywine Creek which had been proposed for industrial development. This purchase led to the founding of the Tri-County Conservancy, which became the Brandywine Conservancy & Museum of Art, an environmental, arts, and cultural preservation organization that presaged similar foundations all over the country. Frolic was the chairman of the board of the Brandywine Conservancy from its beginning until his death. The organization has permanently protected from development more than 62,000 acres in southeastern Pennsylvania and northern Delaware.

In 1969, Weymouth donated his property to the Brandywine Conservancy as its first conservation easement. His home, "The Big Bend," surrounded by Brandywine Creek on three sides, is just inside Pennsylvania at the northern Delaware border. The period-furnished 1750s stone house addition to the original 1650s Swedish log cabin is surrounded by gardens. His donation was followed by those of the Harry G. Haskell, Jr., Ford B. Draper, and Jamie Wyeth. The four easements protected almost 340 acres (1.4 km^{2}) and 5 1/2 miles along the Brandywine Creek.

In 1984, the King Ranch in Pennsylvania went to market. Rumored buyers included a nuclear power plant, Disney, and a real estate developer. Weymouth organized a conservation team to purchase the 5,380 contiguous acres (2,180 ha) for $11.5 million. The land has been conserved and includes the 775-acre (3.14 km^{2}) Laurels Preserve.

In 1967, a mill along the Brandywine went up for auction. Through miscommunication, Weymouth and the Conservancy acquired it. The Brandywine River Museum opened in the building in 1971 after the mill was renovated with the addition of soaring, glass-walled lobbies on three floors.

== Whip or stager ==
Weymouth was a whip, the owner and driver of a coach. He acquired a collection of antique coaches and carriages and used them regularly. He had deeded rights-of-way on neighboring properties to be able to drive his four-in-hand around northern Delaware. His passengers through the years included Richard Nixon and Michael Jackson.

He initiated and led the coaching event at the Winterthur Museum's Point-to-Point in Delaware. He permanently retired a trophy at the Devon Horse Show in Pennsylvania. In the summer of 1985, he spent three months in England and managed to drive a carriage 1,000 miles (1,600 km). He whipped another 1,000 miles (1,600 km) in France.

He once drove from New York City's Upper East Side to Saratoga Springs, New York, and then on to Shelburne, Vermont. Carriages are not uncommon around Central Park but taking the carriage through Harlem caused a sensation.

== Awards and recognition ==
- 1971–77: Appointed by President Richard Nixon to the United States Commission of Fine Arts
- 1974: Served on the Visual Arts Panel of the Pennsylvania Council on the Arts
- 1981: Received the University of Delaware merit award for community service
- 1989: Received National Society of Fund Raising Executives' Outstanding Fund Raising Volunteer award
- 1990: Received the National Arts Club annual award
- 1999: Received Cliveden Heritage Preservation award
- 2000: Received Garden Club of America special citation award for exemplary service in the field of conservation and environmental protection
- 2007: Received the Henry Francis du Pont Award from the Winterthur Museum, Garden and Library

== Exhibitions ==
- 1991 George A. Weymouth: A Retrospective at the Brandywine River Museum
- 1991 George A. Weymouth: A Retrospective at the Jacksonville Art Museum
- 2001 George A. Weymouth: Landscapes and Portraits of Brandywine at the Haggerty Museum of Art, Marquette University, Milwaukee, Wisconsin
- 2018: The Way Back: The Paintings of George A. Weymouth at the Brandywine River Museum
