= Christian C. Sanderson Museum =

American museum of historical artifacts

Coordinates: 39.872890°N 75.591065°W

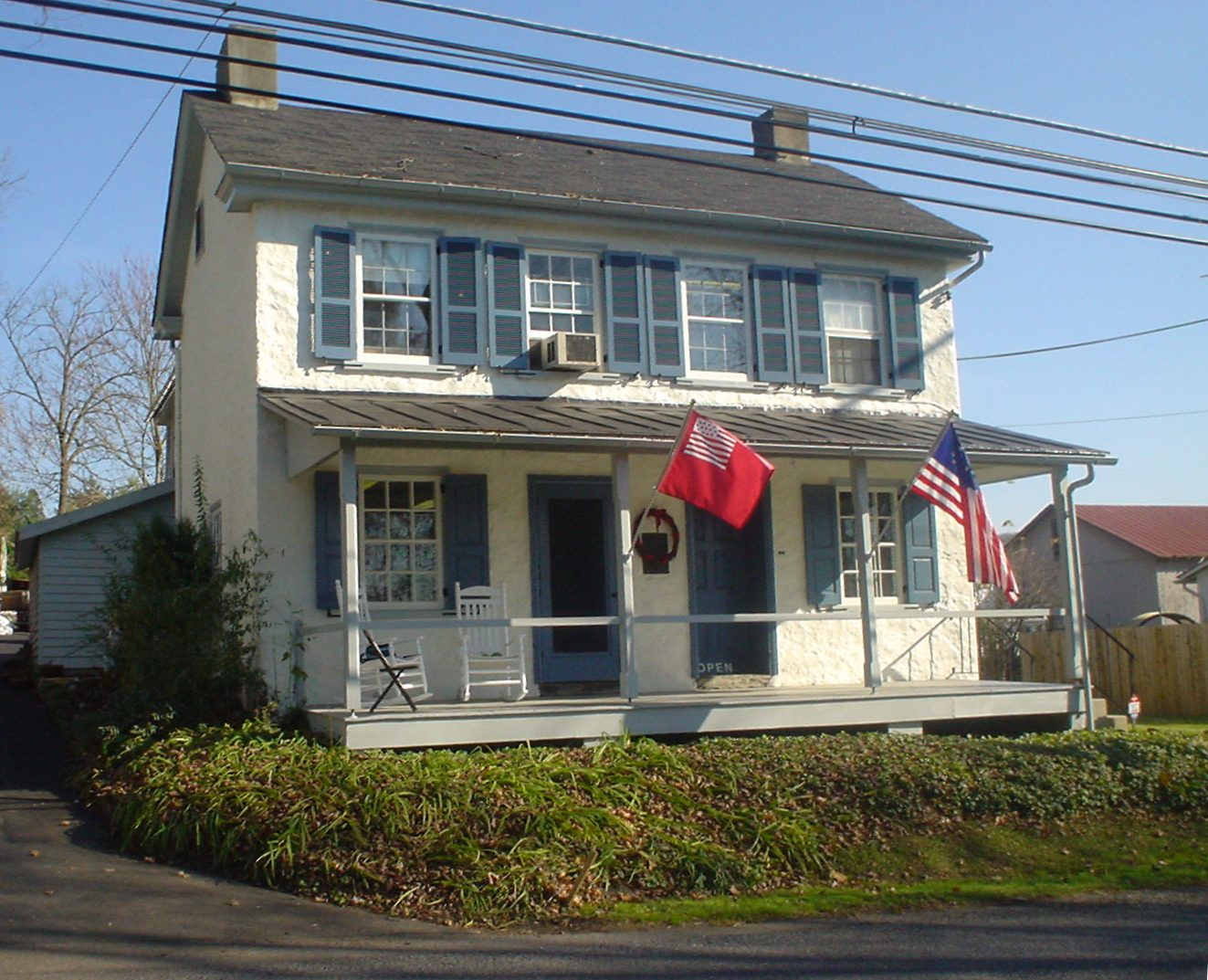
- Museum on Creek Road
- Location: 1755 Creek Road, Chadds Ford Township, Pennsylvania
- Type: Historical non-profit
- Founder: Andrew Wyeth
- Executive director: Makenzie McGonigle
- Curator: Charles Ulmann
- Website: sandersonmuseum.org

The Christian C. Sanderson Museum, or simply the Sanderson Museum, is a non-profit museum of local historical artifacts in Chadds Ford, Pennsylvania, located in the Chadds Ford Historic District. The museum is located at 1755 Creek Road (Old Route 100), Chadds Ford, PA 19317. According to a local newspaper, it get about one thousand visitors per year.

The museum contains part of the bandage put on President Abraham Lincoln after he was assassinated. The museum also houses the pocket book that Jennie Wade was carrying when she was killed at the battle of Gettysburg, and a number of autographs including those of Sitting Bull, Shirley Temple, Helen Keller, and Basil Rathbone. The Sanderson's archives contain close to 80 letters to Sanderson from Civil War veterans.

== History ==
Christian Carmac Sanderson (1882–1966) was a teacher, fiddler, square dance caller, poet, and noted local historian in southeastern Pennsylvania in the early to mid-20th century. He corresponded with a wide range of notable people of his time. Over his lifetime, he collected a large amount of historical memorabilia, which now serves as the museum's primary collection.

Sanderson lived the latter part of his life from 1906 to 1922 in Chadds Ford, Pennsylvania, in the Benjamin Ring House, which was George Washington's headquarters before and after the Battle of Brandywine. He was a close friend of the local Wyeth family, which included several now-famous artists: N.C. Wyeth, Andrew Wyeth, and Jamie Wyeth. Many of their works are now on display there.

After Sanderson died in 1966, some of his friends went to go clean up his house, only to find it full of hundreds of papers, antiques, and souvenirs. It reportedly took a group of volunteers over five years to sort through it all. Andrew Wyeth and five others founded the museum in 1967, by converting an old gristmill.

The board observed the museum's 40th anniversary in April 2007 with the dedication of a bronze plaque to the five founding members. Andrew Wyeth and Thomas Thompson, the two surviving founders, were present for the ceremony. In September 2008, the museum was filmed as part of a British documentary film by Karen Kuder on U.S. Route 1. Sanderson is also the subject of a biography written by his friend Thomas R. Thompson.

In November 2022, the Sanderson Museum hosted part of a mobile art exhibit by Michael Lynch, a sociology professor at Lincoln University, titled Projected in Place. The exhibit takes works of art based on real-life locations, and uses image projectors to superimpose the areas they depict. While the museum gave Lynch permission to do this, he did so without permission at the nearby N. C. Wyeth House and Studio, drawing criticism from its stewarding Brandywine Conservancy.

== See also ==
- Brandywine River Museum of Art
