= Painter's Folly =

Historic house in Pennsylvania, United States

- U.S. National Register of Historic Places
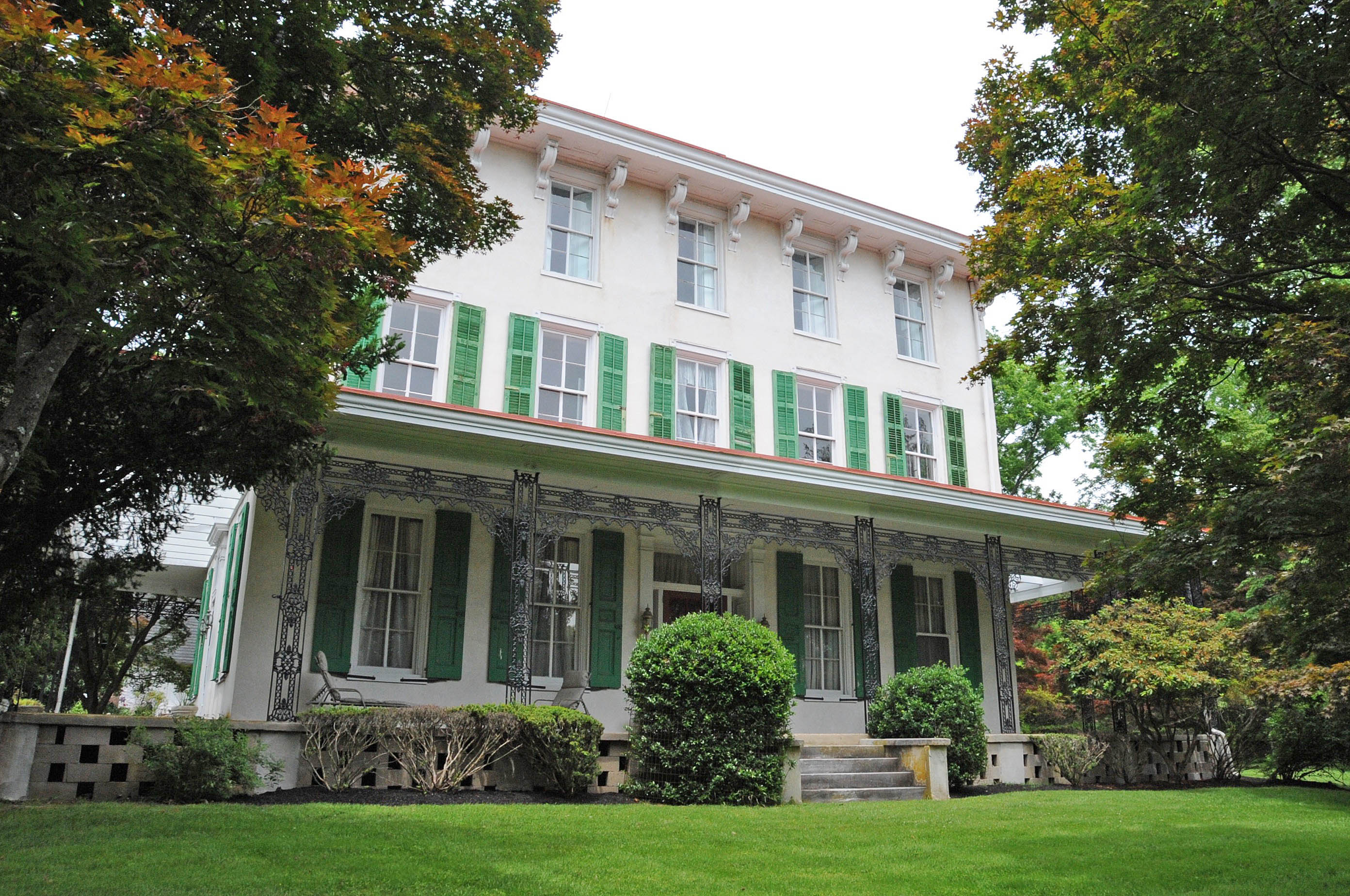
- Location: 1421 Baltimore Pike, Chadds Ford, Pennsylvania, U.S.
- Coordinates: 39°52′26″N 75°34′13″W
- Built: 1856
- Architect: Samuel Painter
- Architectural style: Italianate
- NRHP reference No.: 100010360
- Added to NRHP: May 23, 2024

Painter's Folly is an Italianate historic house located in Chadds Ford, Pennsylvania, United States. Purchased by the township in 2018 with the intention of preserving it and turning into a museum, the house was listed on the National Register of Historic Places in 2024.

== Description and history ==
Painter's Folly was built by a wealthy local farmer named Samuel Painter in 1856, soon after he returned from travels in Europe. The house's ornate Italianate design inspired neighbors to brand it "Painter's Folly." The three-story house spans 58,000 square feet and sits on a four-acre property adjoining the Brandywine Battlefield.

Painter's nephew, Howard Pyle, rented the house as a summer residence, where for years he hosted Brandywine School artists' gatherings and mentored artists, including N. C. Wyeth. Wyeth's son, Andrew Wyeth, later depicted the house in several of his paintings, including Painter's Folly (1989) and Widow's Walk (1990).
