= Brandywine Battlefield =

Historic district in Pennsylvania, United States

- U.S. National Register of Historic Places
- U.S. National Historic Landmark District
- Pennsylvania state historical marker
- Location within Pennsylvania Location within the United States
- Location: Delaware County, Pennsylvania, U.S.
- Nearest city: Philadelphia, Pennsylvania
- Coordinates: 39°52′31″N 75°34′31″W
- Area: 6,100 acres (2,500 ha)
- NRHP reference No.: 66000660

Significant dates
- Added to NRHP: October 15, 1966
- Designated NHLD: January 20, 1961
- Designated PHMC: March 18, 1952

The Brandywine Battlefield Historic Site is a National Historical Landmark. The historic park is owned and operated by the Pennsylvania Historical and Museum Commission, on 52 acres (210,000 m^{2}), near Chadds Ford, Delaware County, Pennsylvania in the United States.

It is part of the site of the Battle of Brandywine, which was fought on September 11, 1777, during the American Revolution, and was a decisive victory for the British and cleared a path directly to the rebel capital of Philadelphia.

Brandywine Battlefield Park became a Pennsylvania State Park in 1949 and a National Historic Landmark in 1961. Although the battle area covered more than ten square miles, or 35,000 acres, the modern park only covers the fifty acres that served primarily as the Continental encampment during the two days prior to the battle.

To the north, another part of the battlefield is maintained by Birmingham Township, Chester County, Pennsylvania as "Battlefield of the Brandywine Park," or "Sandy Hollow Heritage Park." Much of the afternoon's fighting took place between Birmingham Friends Meetinghouse and the William Brinton 1704 House near Dilworthtown.

On August 14, 2009, the state closed the battlefield and three other PHMC museums indefinitely due to a lack of funding as part of an ongoing budget crisis. The historic site opened again after 11 days, operating under an interim agreement between the PHMC and Chadds Ford Township with the Brandywine Battlefield Associates, or "Friends of Brandywine Battlefield" who now operate the site with staff and volunteers.

== Geography ==
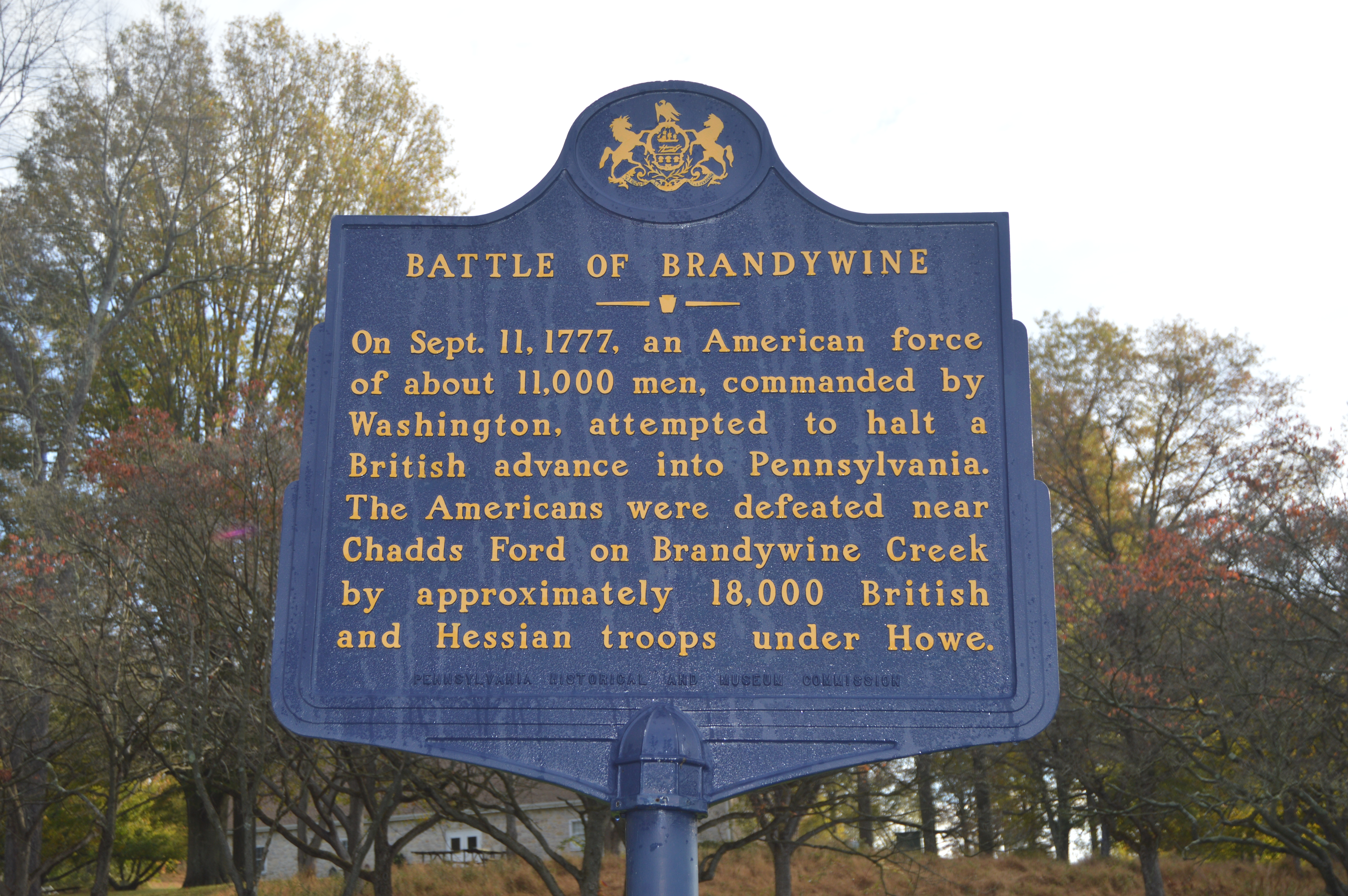
Battle of Brandywine historical marker.

Brandywine Battlefield Park is about a half-mile east of Brandywine Creek in southeastern Pennsylvania. Its proximity to Philadelphia, about 30 miles, led directly to the land being the location of a major battle of the American Revolution. The creek itself was a major military obstacle during the 1770s. Brandywine Creek served as a "moat" that blocked British access to the Schuylkill River and the Continental Congress in Philadelphia. The British Army sought to seize control of Philadelphia, drive the Congress out of the city and thereby bring an end to the war. The area was also a crossroads of the Thirteen Colonies. Control of the roads was crucial to the supply of both the British and Continental Armies.

== Battle ==
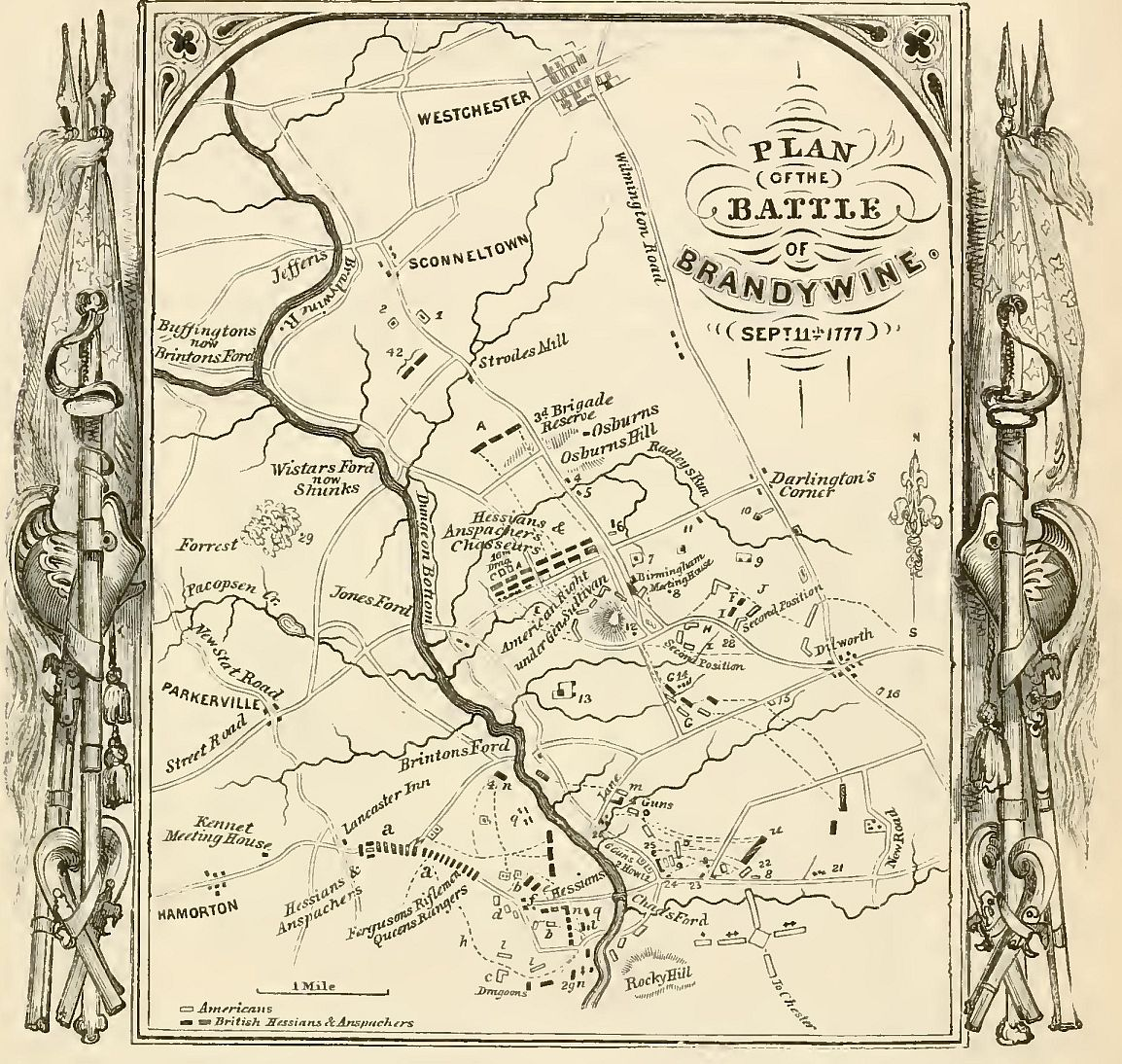
Map of the Battle of Brandywine.

General George Washington moved his troops to the Chadds Ford area to control the high ground, prevent the British Army under the command of General Howe from taking Philadelphia and to avoid being trapped between the British Army on land and the Royal Navy which was positioned on the Delaware River in September 1777. The British had landed at the head of Maryland's Elk River, on the northern end of the Chesapeake Bay near present-day Elkton, approximately 40–50 miles (60–80 km) southwest of Philadelphia and were marching towards Philadelphia.

The British grouped forces at nearby Kennett Square. Howe had no intention of mounting a full-scale attack against the prepared American defenses. He instead employed a flanking maneuver similar to those used in the Battle of Long Island. A portion of the army, about 5,000 men under the command of Wilhelm von Knyphausen, were to advance to meet Washington's troops at Chadds Ford, while the remainder, under the command of Lord Charles Cornwallis, were to march north to Jefferis' Ford, several miles to the north, which Washington had overlooked, and then march south to flank the American forces.

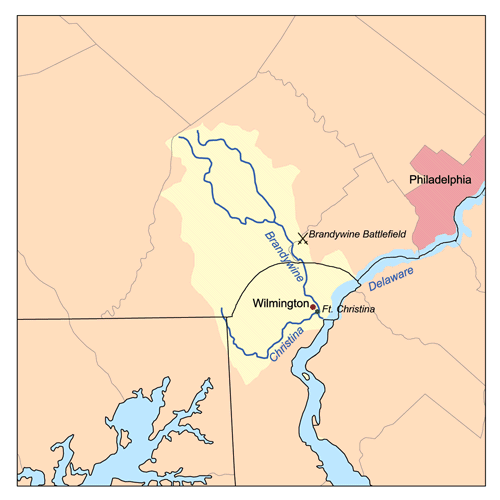
A map of Brandywine Creek (Christina River) showing the location of Brandywine Battlefield Park

September 11 began with a heavy fog, which provided cover for the British troops. Washington received contradictory reports about the British troop movements and continued to believe that the main force was moving to attack at Chadds Ford. The British appeared on the Americans' right flank at around 2 p.m. With Hazen's brigades outflanked, General John Sullivan, tried to reposition his troops to meet the unexpected British threat to their right flank. But Howe was slow to attack the American troops, which bought time for the Americans to position some of their men on high ground at Birmingham Meeting House, about a mile (2 km) north of Chadds Ford. By 4 p.m., the British attacked and quickly gained the ground from the Continental Army. Sullivan then attacked a group of Hessian troops trying to outflank the Americans near Meeting House Hill and bought some time for most of the men to withdraw. But Sullivan's men were cut down by return British fire, forcing them to retreat. At this point, Washington and Greene arrived with reinforcements to try to hold off the British, who now occupied Meeting House Hill. The remains of Sullivan's men held off the pursuing British for nearly an hour but were eventually forced to retreat. The Americans were also forced to leave behind most of their cannon on Meeting House Hill because most of the artillery horses were killed.

Knyphausen, on the east bank of Brandywine Creek, launched an attack against the weakened American center across Chadds Ford, breaking through and Wayne's division and forcing him to retreat and leave behind most of his cannon. Armstrong's militia, never engaged in the combat, also decided to retreat from their positions. Further north, Greene sent Colonel Weedon's troops to cover the road just outside the town of Dilworth to hold off the British long enough for the rest of the Continental Army to retreat. Darkness brought the British pursuit to a standstill, which then left Weedon's force to retreat. The defeated Americans were forced to retreat to Chester where most of them arrived at midnight, with some stragglers arriving until morning.

The battle cost the British about 89 killed and 487 wounded, while they claimed to have killed 200 Colonials, wounded 750 more, and captured over 400 as well as destroying or capturing 11 of the American artillery guns.

Although Howe had defeated the American army, the unexpected resistance he had met prevented him from destroying it completely. The American morale had not been destroyed; despite losing the battle, the Americans had good spirits hoping to fight the British again another day. But neither commander in the battle had proven themselves. Washington had committed a serious error in leaving his right flank wide open and nearly brought on destruction if it had not been for Sullivan, Sterling, and Stephen's divisions that fought for time. Howe had waited too long to attack the American right flank, showing again his lack of killer instincts because he was still afraid of sustaining heavy casualties since the costly victory at the Battle of Bunker Hill two years earlier, and thus allowed most of the American army to escape.

British and American forces maneuvered around each other for the next several days with only minor encounters such as the Paoli Massacre on the night of September 20–21.

The Continental Congress abandoned Philadelphia, first to Lancaster, Pennsylvania for one day and then to York, Pennsylvania. Military supplies were moved out of the city to the Van Leer Furnace in Reading, Pennsylvania during Washington's retreat, where they also came for musket repairs. On September 26, 1777, British forces marched into Philadelphia unopposed.

== Park facilities ==
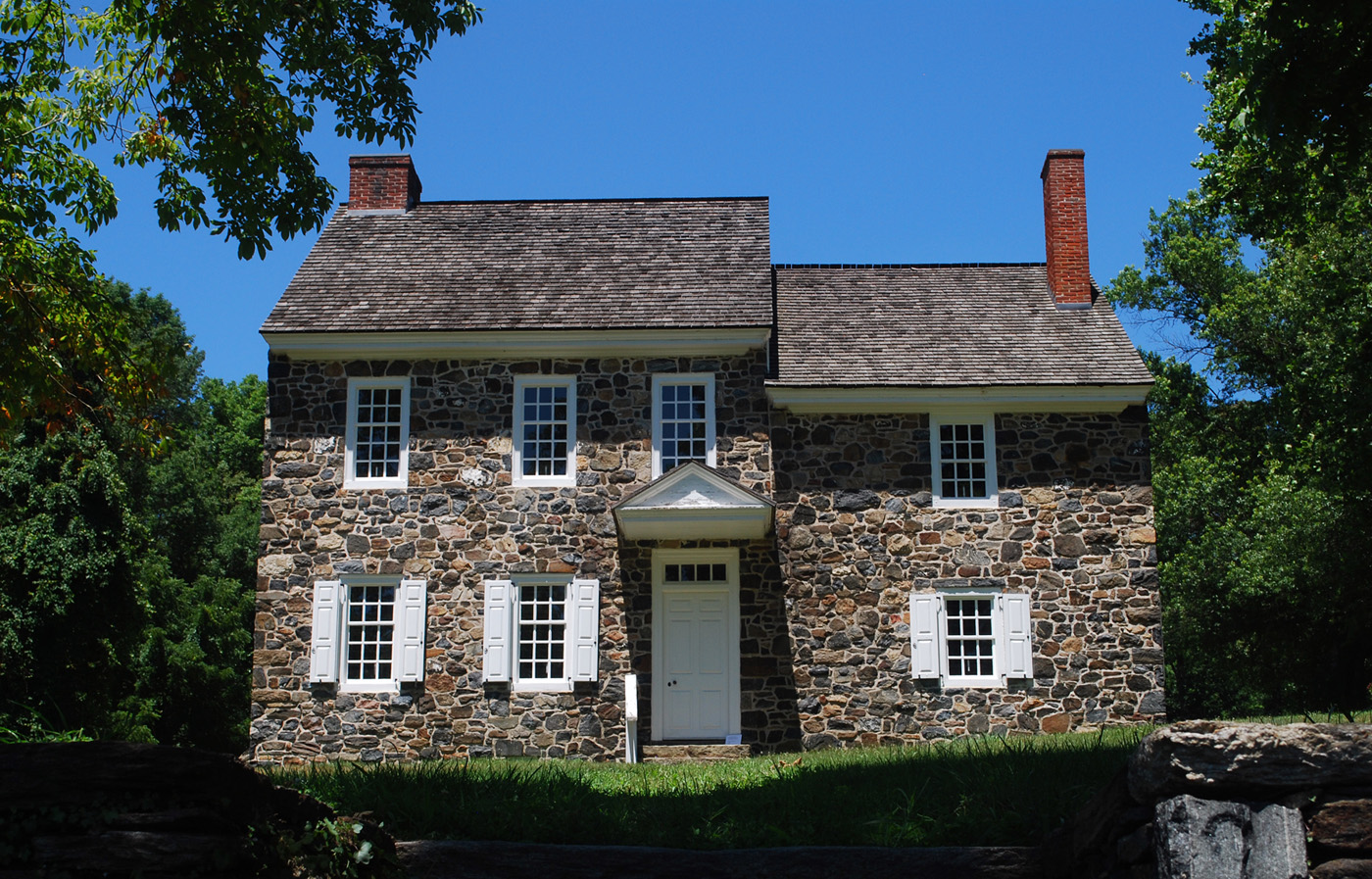
The Benjamin Ring house at the Brandywine Battlefield Park, 2010.

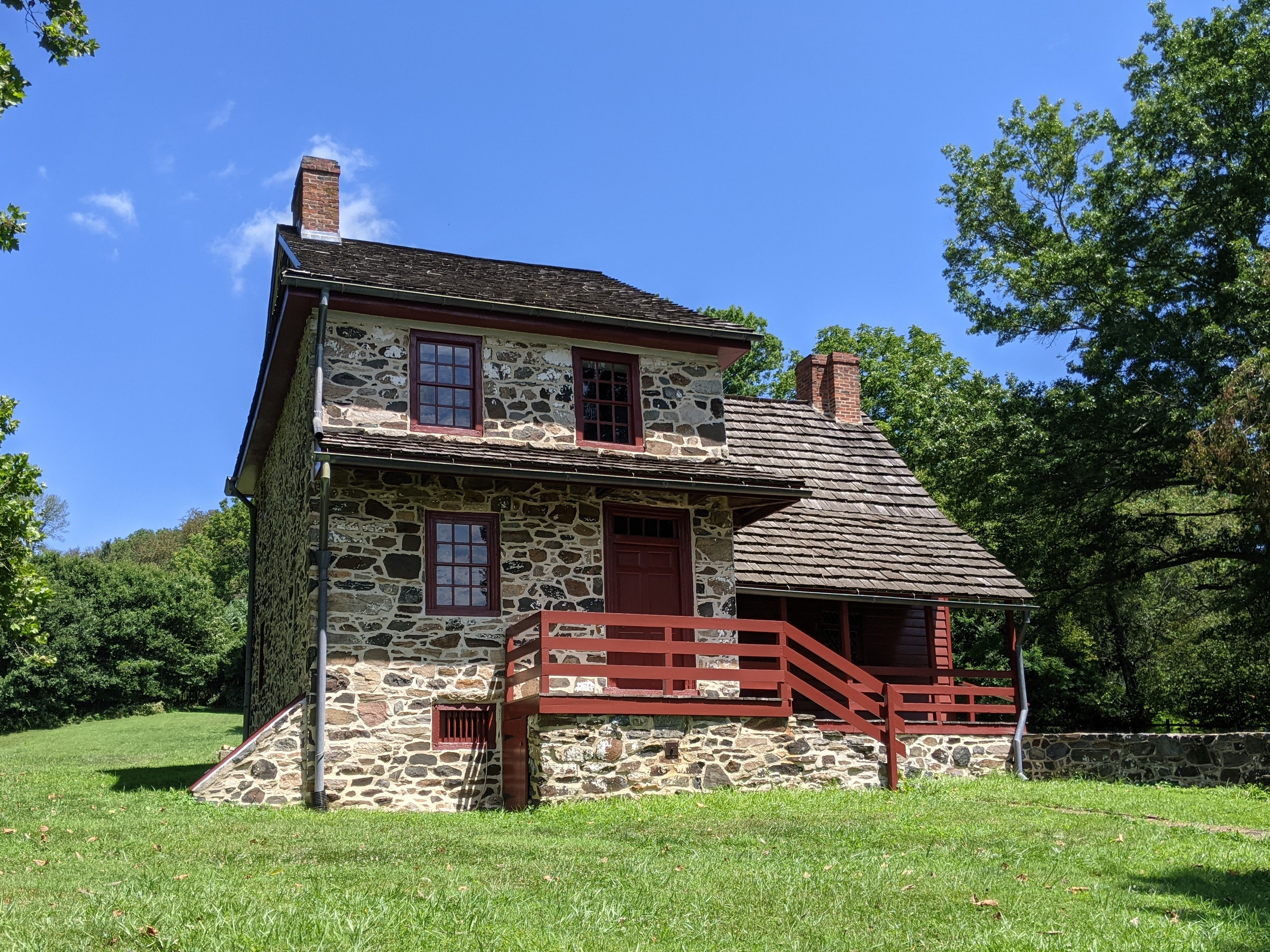
The Gideon Gilpin house at the Brandywine Battlefield Park, 2021.

Brandywine Battlefield Park was the site of a thriving farming community until just before the battle. Quaker farmers were getting ready to harvest their crops, plant winter wheat, slaughter beef cattle, hogs, shear their sheep and sell their yearling colts and fillies. The pacifist Quakers were thrust into the center of the battle and much of their farmland, livestock, and crops were destroyed.

The American officers seized their farmhouses before the battle and the victorious British officers occupied the Quaker's homes after the battle. These homes have been restored to their 1777 appearance and are open to the public. The Benjamin Ring House is believed to have been used as headquarters by George Washington before the battle. A collection of Quaker style furniture is on display at the house with historical information about the battle and Washington's stay at the house.

The Gideon Gilpin House, once the home of a prosperous Quaker farmer and his family, served as quarters for the Marquis de Lafayette before the battle and he was brought back to it when he was wounded in combat. The house was pillaged by the British after the battle.

Reenactors portray Hessian, Quaker farmers, and British and Continental soldiers during many special events held at the park during the year. Staff and volunteers provided daily guided tours of the park and battlefield. They also guide hands on activities, give speeches, sponsor seminars, and host open houses. Much of the battlefield is preserved but encroaching suburban sprawl is threatening the park. The park is protected by its status as a National Historic Landmark District, designated as such by the United States Congress in 1997, 220 years after the Battle of Brandywine.

== Current state ==
The Gideon Gilpin House has been restored and preserved in its 1777 appearance. The Benjamin Ring House used by General George Washington, was used on and off until the 1930s, when young local residents accidentally set off a bomb (fire) that destroyed the home. In the 1950s, a new home was built to reflect the time period of the 1770s.

The American Battlefield Trust and its partners have acquired and preserved more than 187 acres (0.76 km^{2}) of the battlefield as of mid-2023.

== See also ==
- List of American Revolutionary War battles
