= John W. McCoy =

American artist (1910–1989)

John Willard McCoy (1910–1989) was an American artist who painted landscapes, portraits, and still lifes. He was married to the composer Ann Wyeth, the daughter of painter N.C. Wyeth and sister of painter Andrew Wyeth.

== Life and career ==
Born in California, McCoy's family moved to the east coast, first to New Jersey and then to Wilmington, Delaware. He graduated from Cornell University with a degree in Fine Arts, studied for a year in France, worked briefly for the DuPont Company, then enrolled at the Pennsylvania Academy of the Fine Arts before completing his studies privately with N.C. Wyeth, working in his studio alongside the young Andrew Wyeth. It was while studying with the elder Wyeth that he met his future wife, Ann. As did other members of the Wyeth family, McCoy lived in the Brandywine River valley and along the coast of Maine, where he found the people and landscapes he took for his subjects.

Upon N.C. Wyeth's death, McCoy and Andrew Wyeth completed a series of murals that N.C. had begun for the Metropolitan Life Building in New York City.

McCoy worked in tempera, watercolor, and oil paint, and eventually preferred a mixed media approach that entailed soaking paper in water prior to painting on it with successive layers of both oil and water-based media, which he dripped or poured on the paper in the manner of the Abstract expressionists whose work he admired.

McCoy's works are in the collections of the Delaware Art Museum, the Brandywine River Museum, the Santa Barbara Museum of Art, and the Pennsylvania Academy of the Fine Arts.

Andrew Wyeth recalled McCoy in an interview:

I think I may well have been influenced by his rather somber look at things. There is a brooding quality, a smoldering power in his painting.

== See also ==
- Wyeth
