= Chaddsford Winery =

Winery in Pennsylvania, United States

Coordinates: 39.872656°N 75.626880°W

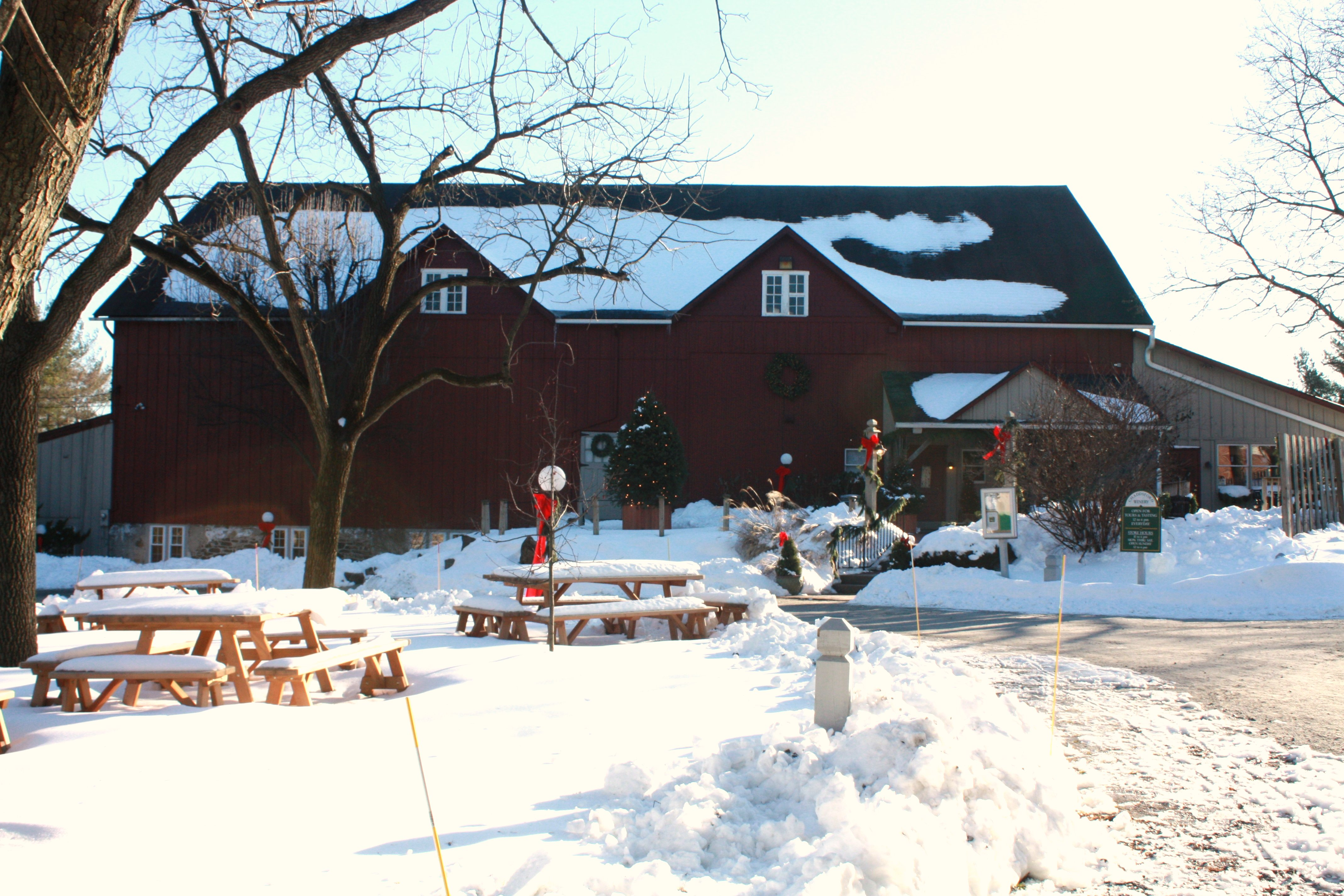
- Location: Chadds Ford, Pennsbury Township, Chester County, Pennsylvania, US
- Founded: 1982
- Varietals: Pinot Noir, Chardonnay, Niagara, Merlot, Cabernet Sauvignon, Spiced Apple, Dry Rose, Spring Wine, Sangria
- Tasting: Open to Public
- Website: http://www.chaddsford.com

Chaddsford Winery is a Pennsylvania winery located in the Brandywine Valley, in Pennsbury Township, Chester County, Pennsylvania, United States. It was founded in 1982, and is one of the largest wineries in the state, producing more than 30,000 cases annually.

The Winery operates a satellite Bottle Shop + Tasting Room in Lahaska, Bucks County, Pennsylvania.

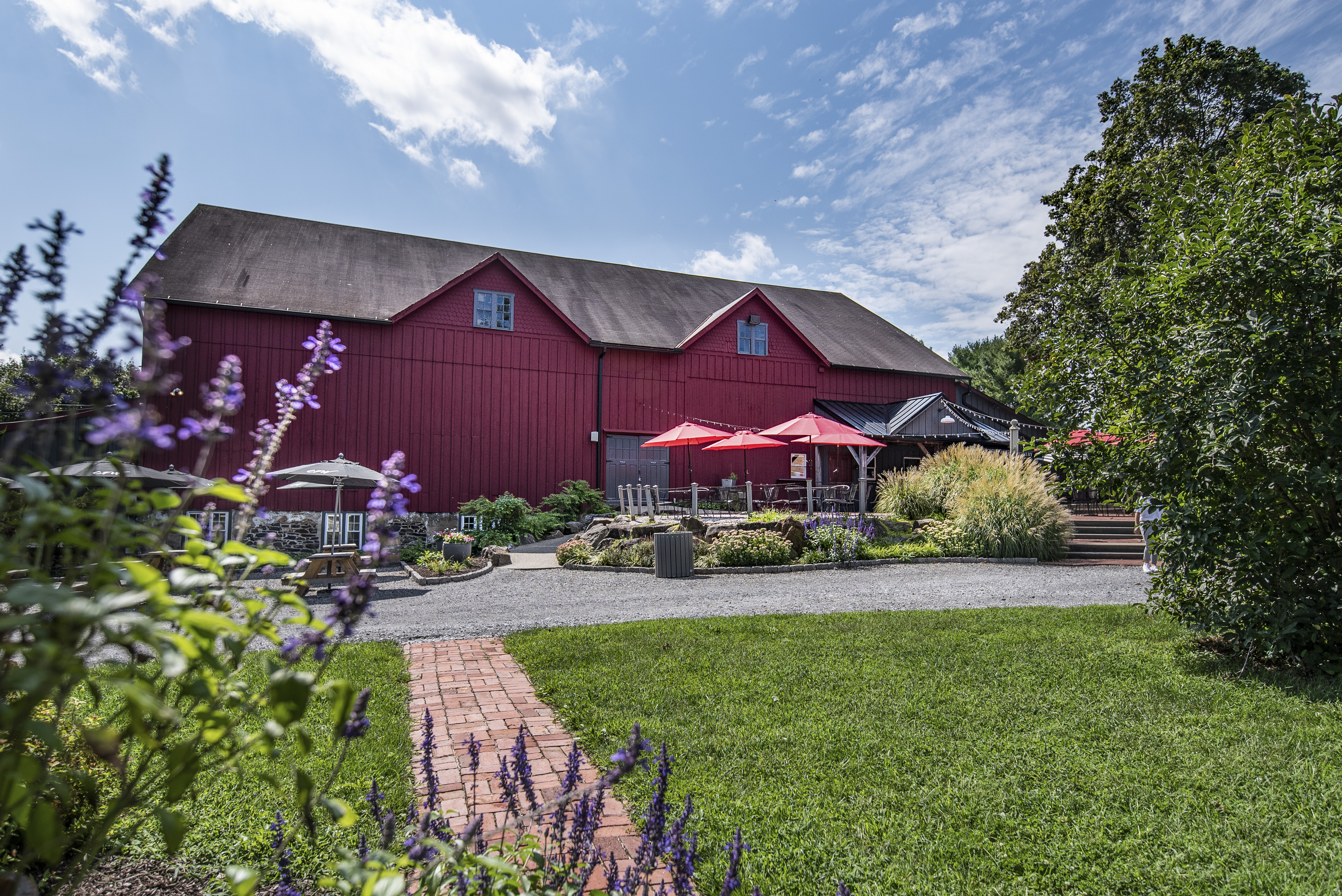
Chaddsford Winery, September 2020

In 2012, founder Eric Miller left the company. Though its focus shifted towards sweet wines at the time, the Winery now produces a wide-ranging portfolio including sweet, off-dry, dry, and sparkling styles.

The Chaddsford 2017 Cabernet Franc was selected as a finalist in the 2019 PA Sommelier Judgement Day awards. Under current winemaker Gabriel Rubilar, Chaddsford 2020 Sparkling Sémillon was recognized as the Best Sparkling wine in the state of PA at the 2022 PA Sommelier Judgement Day awards.

The winery offers seasonal wine events throughout the year, including tastings and festivals, as well as operating a Wine Club community. Chaddsford's corporate goals include approachability, community and sustainability.
