= John Chads House =

Historic house in Pennsylvania, United States

- Chads House
- U.S. National Register of Historic Places
- Pennsylvania state historical marker
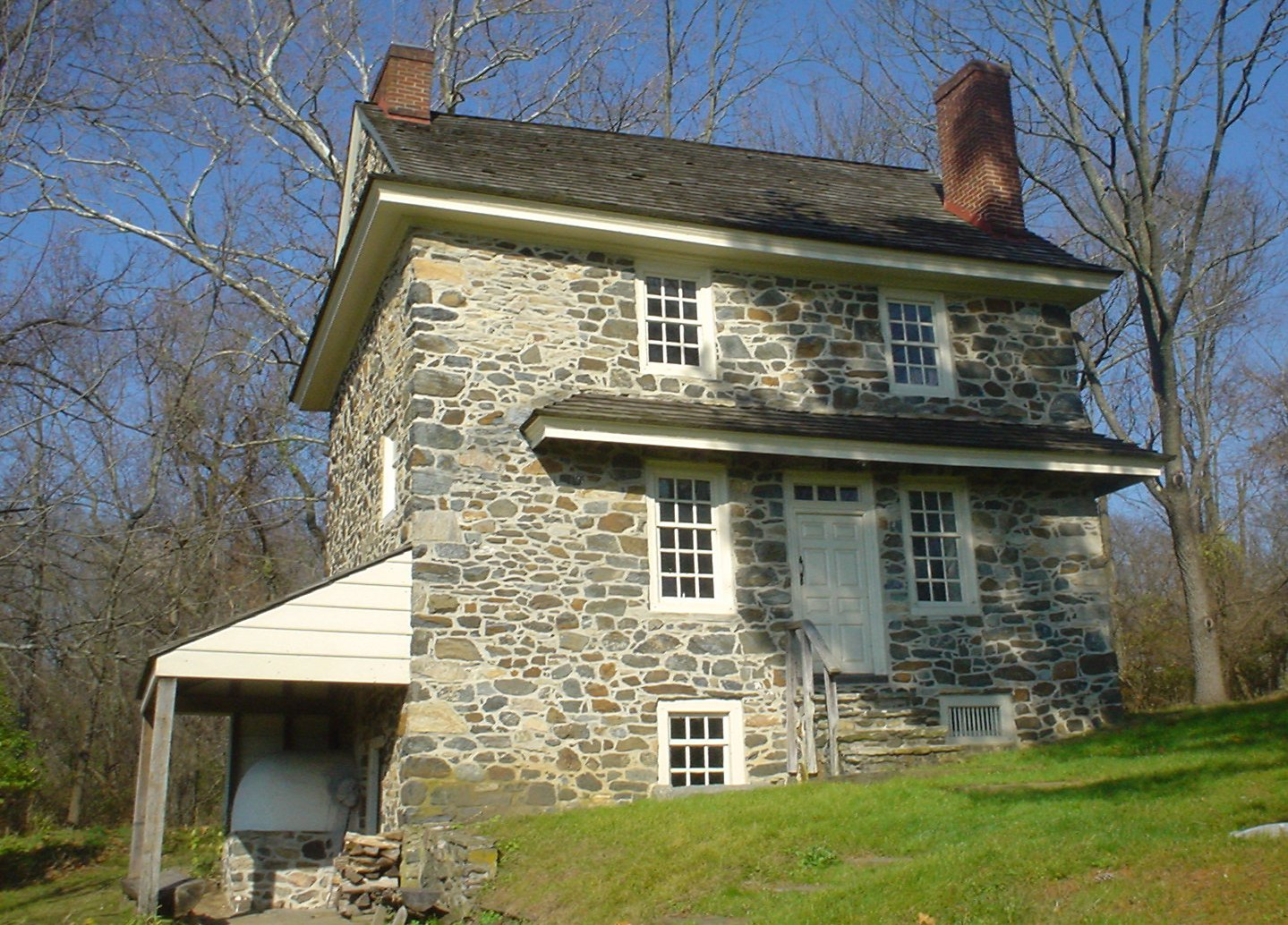
- Chads House, November 2009

- Location within Pennsylvania Location within the United States
- Location: PA 100, Chadds Ford, Pennsylvania
- Coordinates: 39°52′29″N 75°35′31″W
- Area: 4 acres (1.6 ha)
- Built: 1713
- Architect: Wyeth, John Jr.
- Architectural style: "Bank" house
- NRHP reference No.: 71000698

Significant dates
- Added to NRHP: March 11, 1971
- Designated PHMC: September 1915

The Chads House (sometimes erroneously called the Chad House), which was built by John Wyeth Jr. for John Chads (also spelled Chadds), is located in Chadds Ford, Delaware County, Pennsylvania. The house was built after 1712 and was added to the National Register of Historic Places on March 11, 1971. John Chad's widow, Elizabeth, stayed in the house while it was in the line of fire during the Battle of Brandywine. The city of Chadds Ford relied on the spring ford on the property, and thus the city was named after John Chads.

== History ==
Francis Chadsey came to Pennsylvania in 1685 and bought 500 acres in Birmingham Township, then in Chester County, in 1696, from Daniel Smith who had bought the land from William Penn. Chadsey did not take possession of the land until 1702, but then built a grist mill and a millrace on the land. He married Grace Stanfield in 1695 and they had six children before he died in 1713. Grace remarried in 1714 to Guyen Stevenson and died in 1727. Chadsey's oldest son, John Chads, reached legal majority in 1717. and inherited the property.

The initials J.W. Jr. are carved in the front of the house, and appear to indicate that the house was built by John Wyeth Jr. Wyeth likely built the house for Chads sometime between 1713 and 1727. It is a "bank house" having been built into the side of a hill and remains essentially in its original condition.

John Chads started a ferry service across the Brandywine in 1731 and operated it until his death in 1760. The ferry continued in service until 1828 when a bridge was built nearby. During the Battle of Brandywine General Wilhelm von Knyphausen's division feigned a direct attack across the Brandywine near the ferry and exchanged cannon fire with George Washington's forces in fortified positions above the house. Chads' widow Elizabeth remained in the house throughout the battle, watching troop movements from her attic windows, she survived until 1791.

Along with providing water, the nearby Springhouse served as a school from 1837 to 1844. Both the John Chads' House and Springhouse were privately owned until 1968, after which they were restored by architect John Milner, and opened as a museum in 1971. The beehive oven in the basement of the house was rebuilt in 1981 and continues to operate to the present.

== See also ==
- National Register of Historic Places listings in Delaware County, Pennsylvania

http://www.hmdb.org/marker.asp?marker=50112
