= Twaddell's Mill and House =

Historic house in Pennsylvania, United States

- U.S. National Register of Historic Places
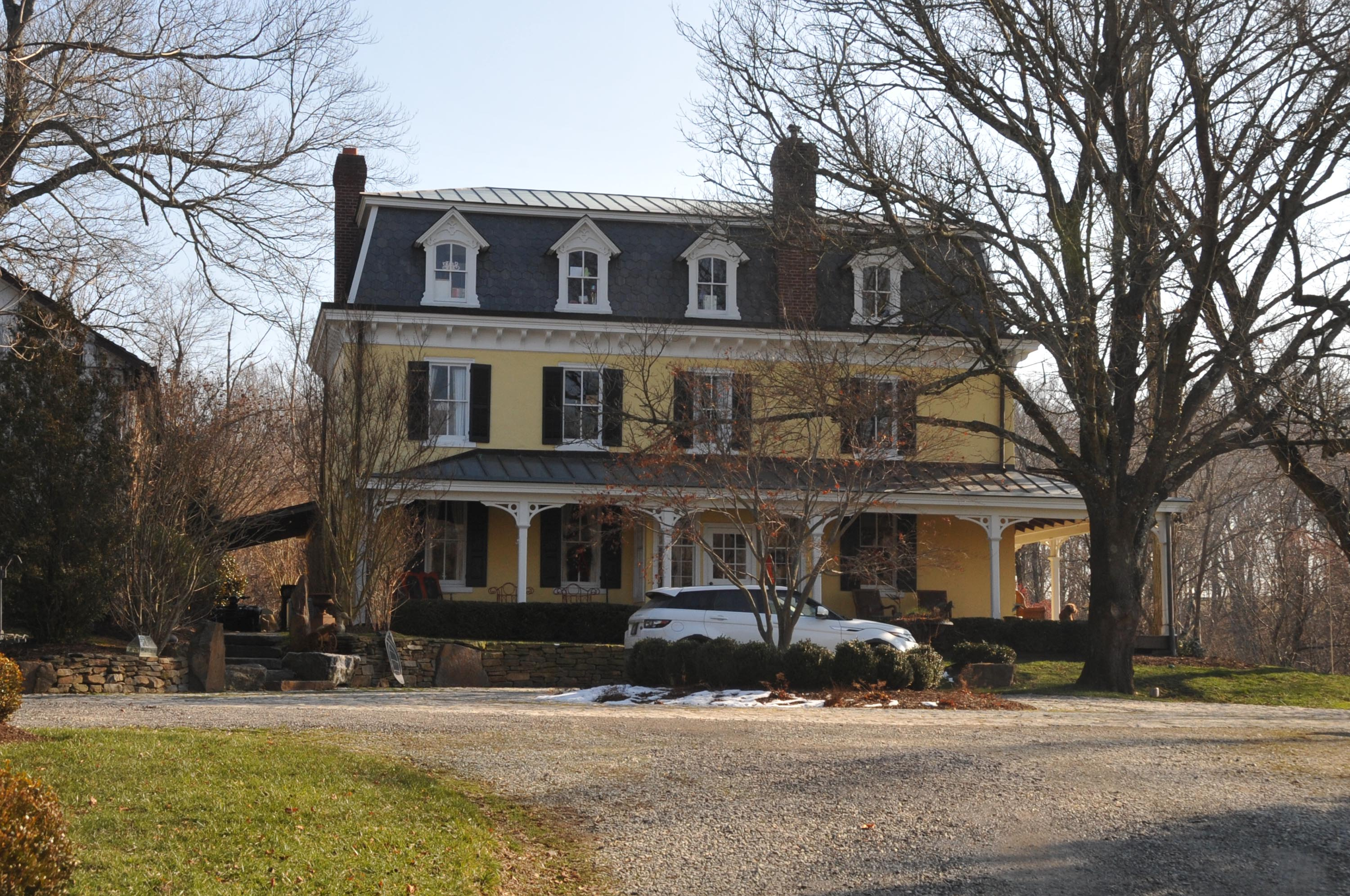
- Twaddell's Mill and House

- Location within Pennsylvania Location within the United States
- Location: Rock Hill Road south of Chadds Ford, Chadds Ford Township, Pennsylvania
- Coordinates: 39°50′40″N 75°35′24″W
- Area: 120 acres (49 ha)
- Built: 1812
- Architectural style: Bank House
- NRHP reference No.: 73001623
- Added to NRHP: March 7, 1973

Twaddell's Mill and House, also known as the Great Bend of the Brandywine and Big Bend, is an historic home and mill complex that is located in Chadds Ford Township, Delaware County, Pennsylvania, United States.

The property includes the main house, the foundation and part of the walls of a sawmill. It also includes a root cellar, an ice house, and a spring house. It was added to the National Register of Historic Places in 1973.

== History and architectural features ==
Before the occupation by Quaker settlers, the land of the Great Bend was the location of the Lenape village known as Queonemysing (place of the long fish).

The main house is a two-and-one-half to three-and-one-half-story bank house that was built using stone. The house was built between 1810 and 1820, using mid-eighteenth century building techniques.

Notably, American artist and conservationist George Alexis Weymouth lived in the house after purchasing it in 1961. He died there in 2016.

== See also ==
- George Alexis Weymouth
