= William Painter Farm =

Historic house in Pennsylvania, United States

- U.S. National Register of Historic Places
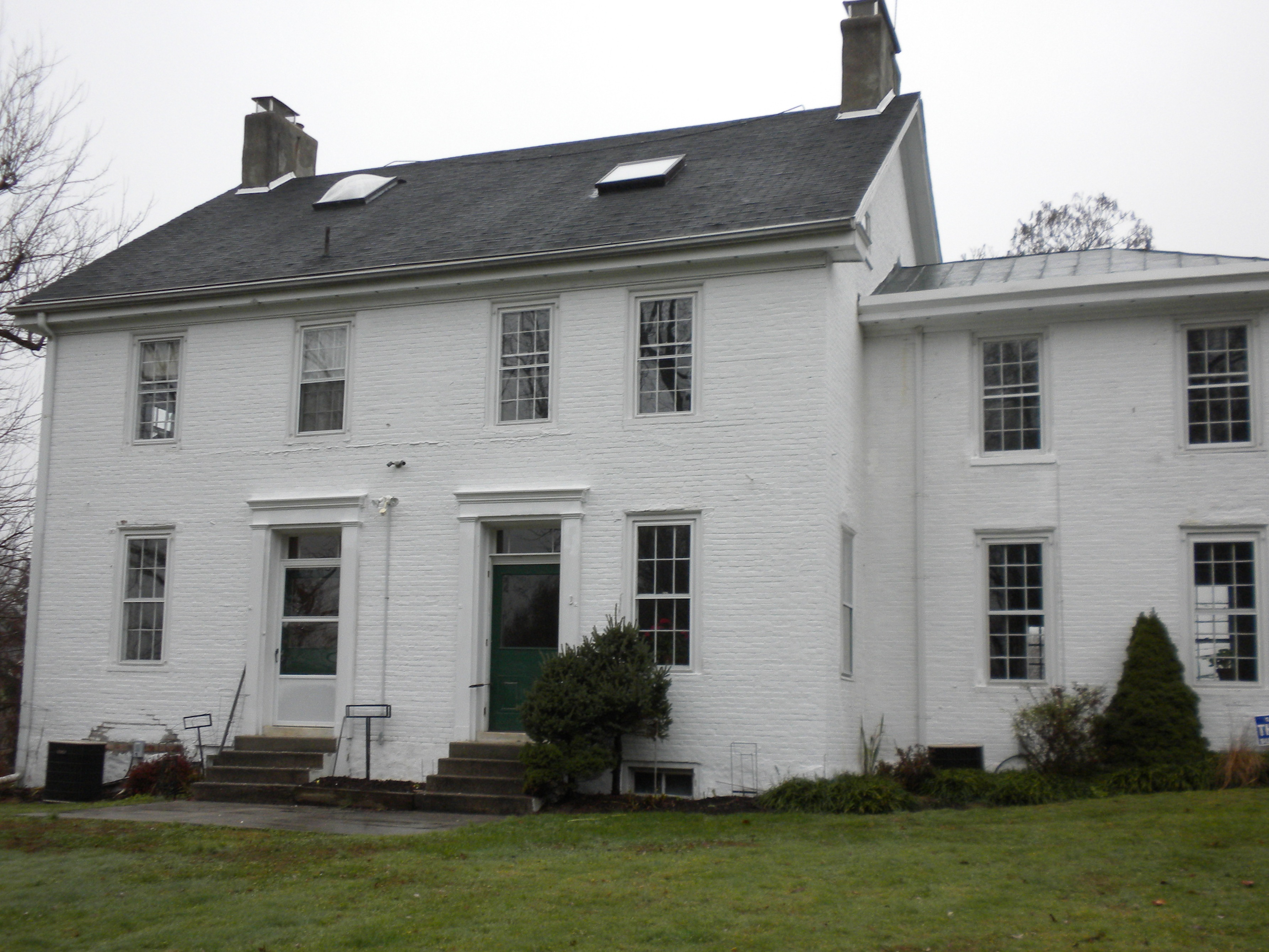
- William Painter Farm, November 2009

- Location within Pennsylvania Location within the United States
- Nearest city: 2 miles (3.2 km) northeast of Chadds Ford on U.S. Route 1, Chadds Ford Township, Pennsylvania
- Coordinates: 39°52′42″N 75°33′10″W
- Area: 4.9 acres (2.0 ha)
- Built: 1808
- NRHP reference No.: 71000701
- Added to NRHP: July 27, 1971

William Painter Farm is a historic home located at Chadds Ford Township, Delaware County, Pennsylvania. It was built in 1808, and is a two-story painted brick building with a late 19th- and an early 20th-century addition. The home was used as a station on the Underground Railroad.

It was added to the National Register of Historic Places in 1971.
