= Ann Wyeth McCoy =

American composer, pianist and painter

American composer, pianist and painter Ann Wyeth McCoy (March 15, 1915 – November 10, 2005) was the youngest daughter of artist-illustrator N.C. Wyeth and the fourth of his five children. She was born in Chadds Ford, Pennsylvania.

== Life and career ==
McCoy had a life-long interest in antique porcelain dolls, which began in 1923 when she received her first doll as a gift from her parents on her eighth birthday. Each subsequent birthday and Christmas during her childhood, she received another doll. From 1972 to 2004 her doll collection was exhibited at the Brandywine River Museum in Chadds Ford during the Christmas holidays.

McCoy studied piano with William Hatton Greene, composition with Harl McDonald at the University of Pennsylvania, and painting with her father. In 1934 her composition Christmas Fantasy was performed by the Philadelphia Orchestra, with Leopold Stokowski conducting. In 1935, she married John W. McCoy II, a young artist whom she had met when he studied with her father at the Chadds Ford studio. They had three children, John Denys, Anna Brelsford, and Maude Robin. McCoy did not begin painting seriously until her children grew up. The first formal exhibition of her work, mainly watercolors, was in the late 1960s. The Brandywine River Museum has an Ann Wyeth McCoy collection, which contains correspondence, photographs, musical compositions, sound recordings, and her early drawings. The collection also details her interest in antique porcelain dolls.

McCoy composed many songs for special people or occasions, such as a tribute to a White House dinner honoring her brother Andrew Wyeth; lullabies for the children of friends and family; and songs about art such as her brother's paintings or a sculpture by Degas. She also set poetry to music for piano.

== Works ==
Her musical compositions include:

=== Orchestra ===
- Christmas Fantasy
- In Memoriam (dedicated to her father N.C. Wyeth)
- Maine Summer

=== Piano ===
- Anna Kuerner
- Black Angus
- Brook in Winter
- Cannibal Shore
- Chambered Nautilus
- Children's Pieces
- Christmas
- Christmas Tree
- Embers
- Fog
- For Joel Wyeth Nields
- For John McCoy
- George VI: Death of a King
- (The) German
- Glen Mere Church, Maine
- Grandfather's Sleigh
- Helga Suite: Chorale
- In Memoriam: to NCW
- In Memory of Robin's Dog "Charlie"
- Irish Dance
- Lament for Christina Olson and Her World
- Maine Preludes
- March of the Knights
- Mort de Nureyev
- Mushrooms by Jamie
- Music Box for Betsy Wyeth
- Music for Jamie
- Newell
- Patriot - March for Ralph Cline
- Portrait of My Father N.C. Wyeth
- Prelude: After the Swans
- Reverie: In Memoriam Robert F. Kennedy
- Sarabande
- Soliloquy
- Song Sirens
- To a Wax Ballerina by Degas
- To John's Picture of Sandpipers
- To Robin McCoy and Her Horse Kilo
- Tone Poem on the Helga Paintings
- Triumphant Entrance and Lullaby for John Wyeth McCoy

=== Vocal ===
- Christmas Salutation from Chadd's Ford (text by N. C. Wyeth; music by Ann Wyeth McCoy)
- Songs

== See also ==
- Piano Music of Ann Wyeth McCoy by Dr. Donna Mulzet Beech, 2017
- Piano Music of Ann Wyeth McCoy, Book Two: Of Paintings and a Sculpture by Dr. Donna Mulzet Beech, 2020
- The Natural Thing to Do: the Music of Ann Wyeth McCoy, a documentary by Denys McCoy narrated by Richard Chamberlain
