= Chadds Ford Historic District =

Historic district in Pennsylvania, United States

- U.S. National Register of Historic Places
- U.S. Historic district
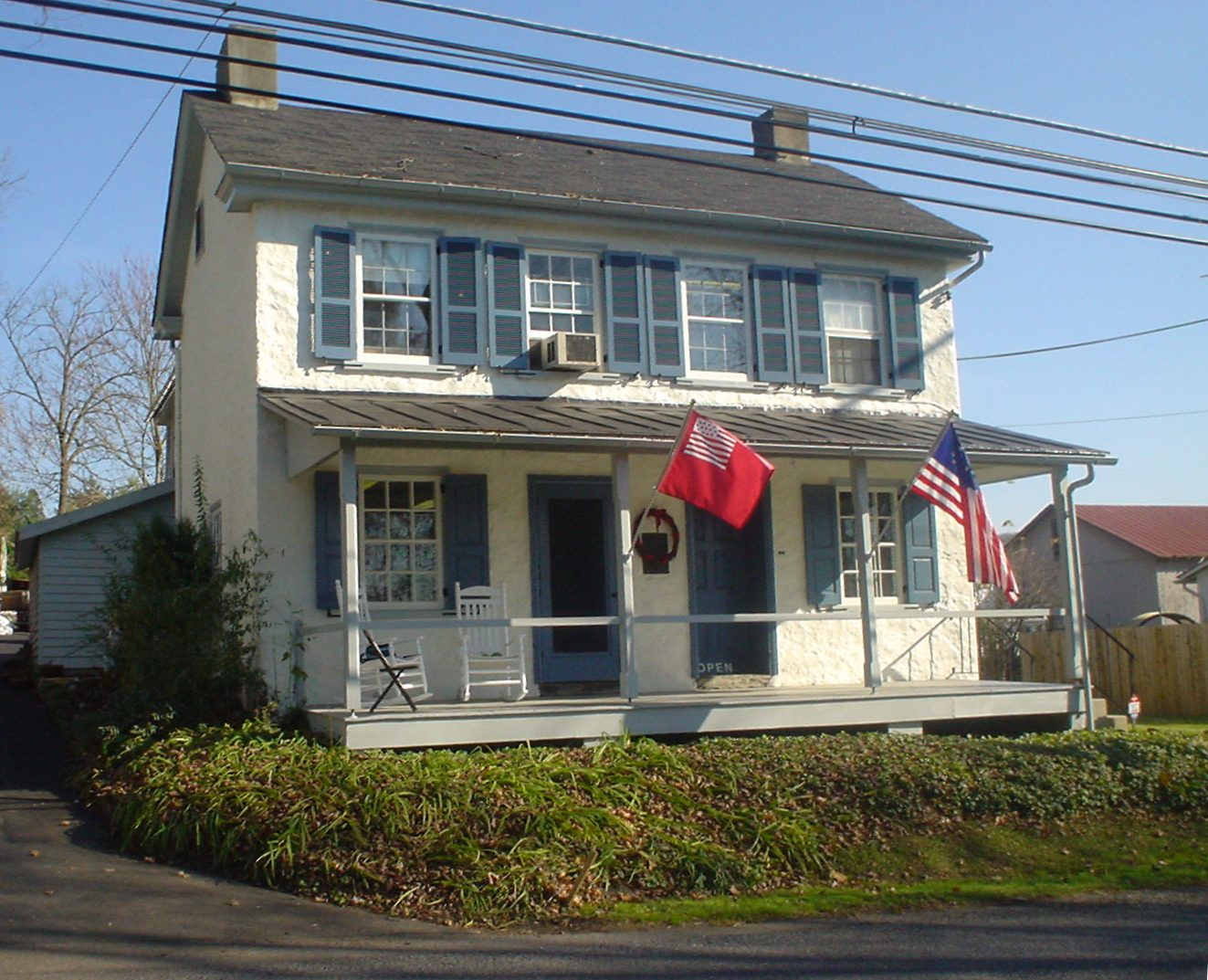
- Christian C. Sanderson Museum, November 2009

- Location within Pennsylvania Location within the United States

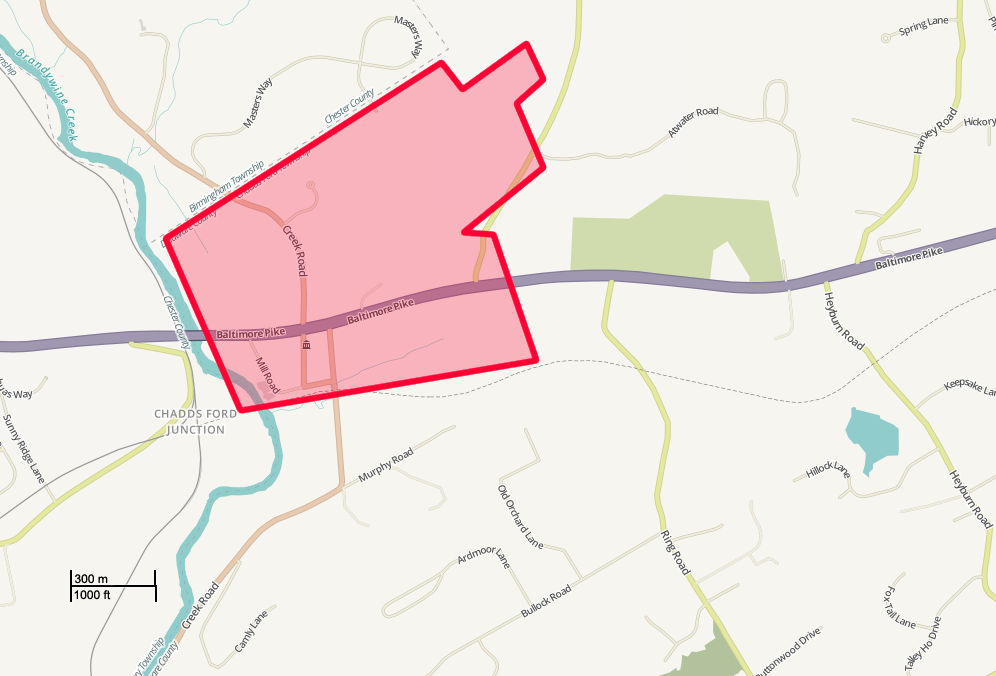
- Approximate historic district boundaries
- Location: Jct. of U.S. 1 and PA 100, Chadds Ford Township, Pennsylvania
- Coordinates: 39°52′17″N 75°35′31″W
- Area: 86 acres (35 ha)
- Architect: Multiple
- NRHP reference No.: 71000699
- Added to NRHP: November 23, 1971

Chadds Ford Historic District is a national historic district located at Chadds Ford Township, Delaware County, Pennsylvania. The district includes 17 contributing buildings in Chadds Ford village. Notable buildings include the Chads Ford Inn (1807-1810), Merchant Mill (1864), a row of houses built between 1840 and 1850, the bridge across Brandywine Creek, and the Christian C. Sanderson Museum. Located in the district are the separately listed Chad House and N. C. Wyeth House and Studio.

It was added to the National Register of Historic Places in 1971.
