= Gilpin Homestead =

Historic house in Pennsylvania, United States

- U.S. National Register of Historic Places
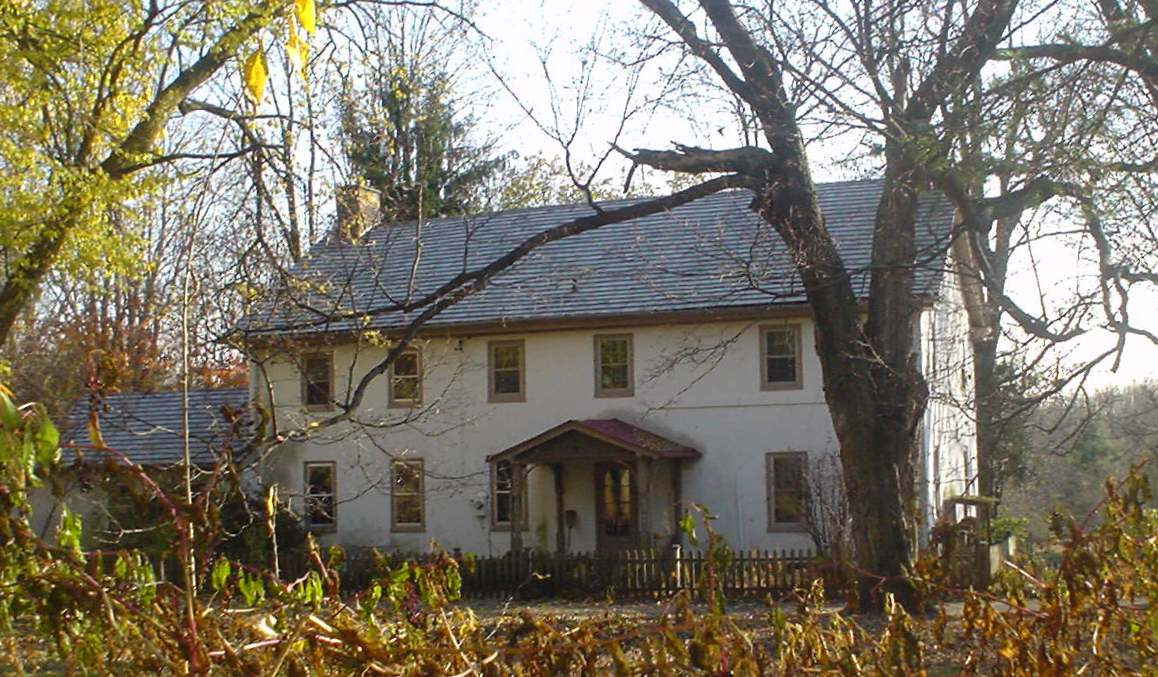
- Gilpin Homestead, November 2009

- Location within Pennsylvania Location within the United States
- Location: Harvey Rd., Chadds Ford, Pennsylvania
- Coordinates: 39°53′2″N 75°33′50″W
- Area: 6 acres (2.4 ha)
- Built: 1754, c. 1811
- NRHP reference No.: 71000700
- Added to NRHP: May 27, 1971

The Gilpin Homestead, also known as the Gideon Gilpin House or the General Howe Headquarters, is a historic home located in Chadds Ford, Delaware County, Pennsylvania.

It was added to the National Register of Historic Places in 1971.

== History and architectural features ==
The original house was built in 1754, and consisted of a brick building with two basement rooms, two first-floor rooms, two bedrooms, and the attic. Sometime around 1811, a stone addition was built that is now the middle of the house, and a second stone addition was completed by 1859. A porch was added between 1870 and 1897, and the garage was attached in 1949. Also located on the property are a carriage house-barn, small barn, spring house, a creamery-cheese house, and the stone remains of a barn built in 1860. William Howe, 5th Viscount Howe used the Gilpin house as his headquarters from late afternoon of September 11, until the morning of September 16, 1777, after the Battle of Brandywine.

The 1754 section was added to an earlier house, probably built in the 1730s. This was eventually torn down to allow for the nineteenth century additions. There is not, and never was a staircase in the 1754 section, but visible on the plaster wall in the present stair hall, is the "witness" of the original stair.

== See also ==
- National Register of Historic Places listings in Delaware County, Pennsylvania
