= Benjamin Ring House =

Historic house in Pennsylvania, United States

Coordinates: 39°52′27.4″N 75°34′46.6″W

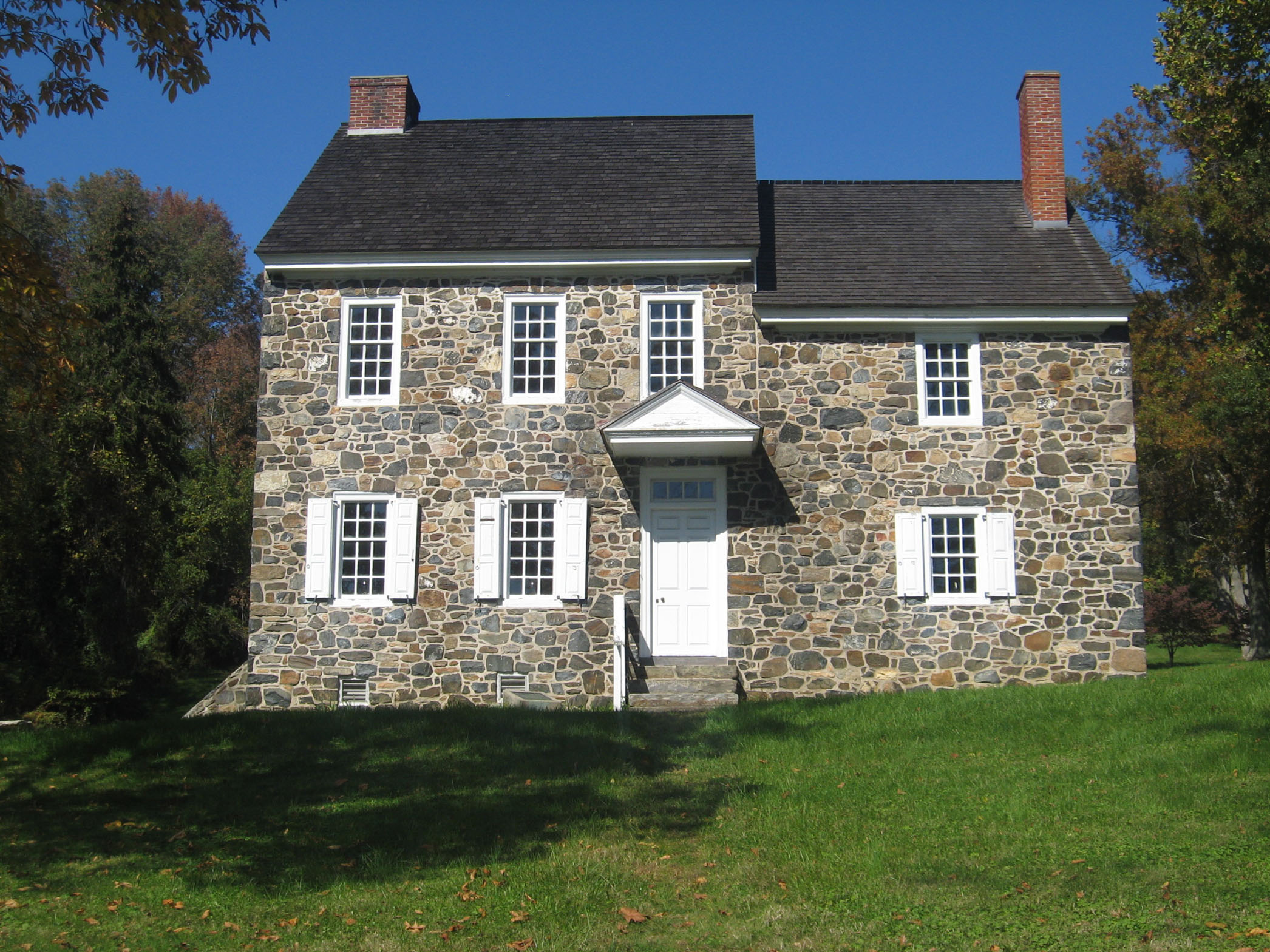
Benjamin Ring House.

Benjamin Ring House is a historic building on the Brandywine Battlefield in Chadds Ford, Pennsylvania, United States. It served as headquarters for General George Washington prior to and during the September 11, 1777 Battle of Brandywine.

== History ==
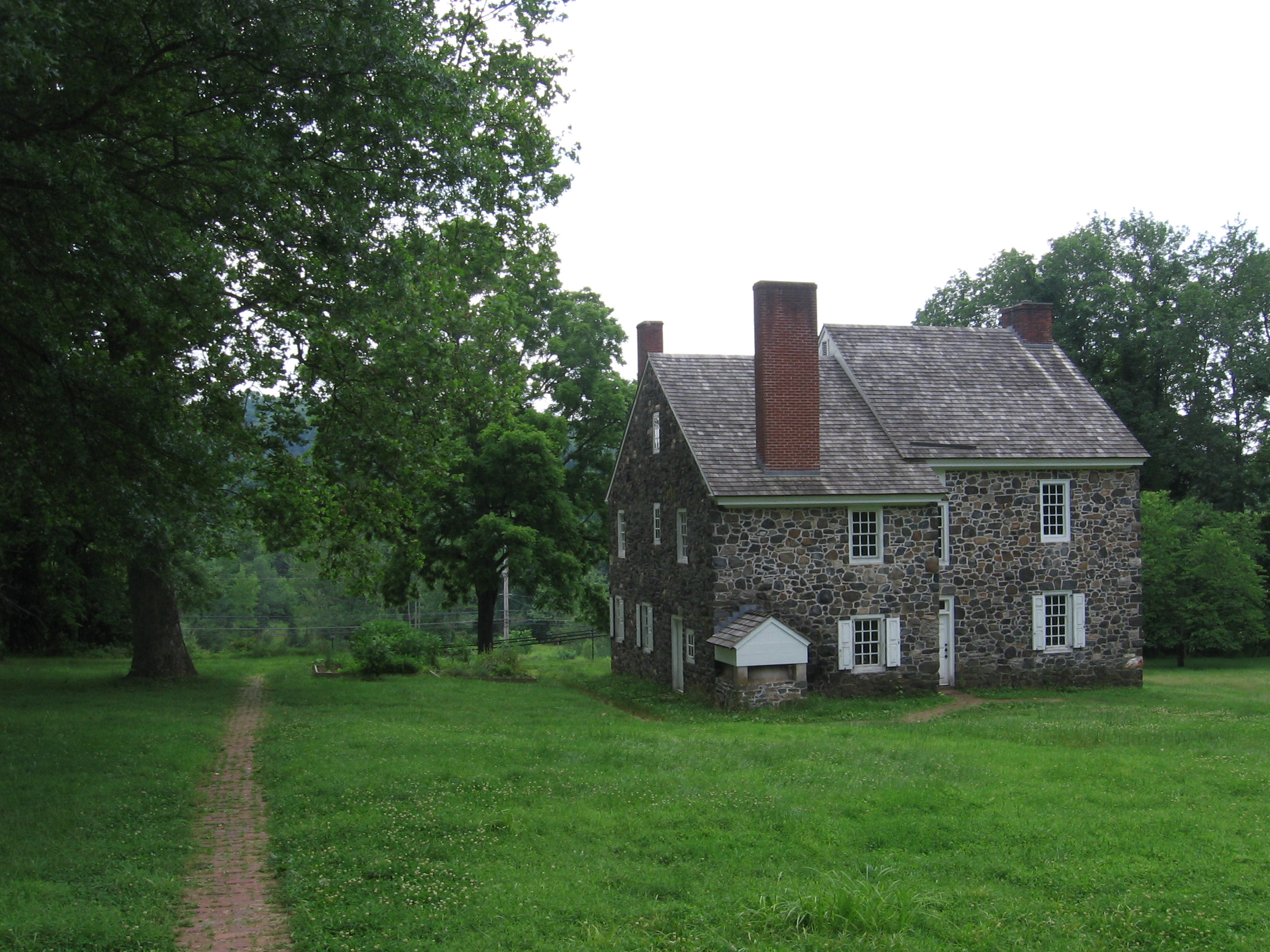
Rear of the house.

The house was built in 1731 by Thomas G. Clark. Benjamin Ring (died 1804), a farmer and mill operator, was its owner in 1777. As a Quaker, he did not participate in the war. Located along the main road from Philadelphia to Baltimore, the house was about a mile east of the ford at Brandywine Creek.

At the end of August, some 17,000 British troops landed at Elkton, Maryland, and were marching toward Philadelphia. Washington had about 14,600 troops waiting to attack. Washington held a Council of War at the house on September 9, and anticipated that the British Army would cross at the ford. Instead, on September 11, the bulk of British forces crossed upstream and attacked from the north, surprising and overwhelming the Continental soldiers.

The 19-year-old Marquis de Lafayette was wounded in the battle, and carried to the nearby Gideon Gilpin House.

Ring later operated the house as a tavern, and his son operated it as a hotel. Washington had asked Benjamin Ring to lead the Continental army's retreat out of the area when he realized the battle was a loss. Because of his age and weight Ring turned down his request and suggested William Harvey. This was not the William Harvey, Jr. that "defended" the Harvey House on the west bank, but from one of the second generation of Harveys that lived on the east bank. He led the Continental army to safety. This story is from Benjamin Ring's grandson, Samuel, in a letter he wrote to his cousin in the 1830s. Eli Harvey later bought the Ring House and ran a tavern. The Harveys had been maltsters in both England and in Chadds Ford.

== Historic site ==
A September 16, 1931 fire severely damaged the house. Brandywine Battlefield Park became a Pennsylvania State Park in 1949 and a National Historic Landmark in 1961. The house was restored to its 1777 appearance, and opened as a house museum. A collection of Quaker-style furniture is on display, with historical information about the battle and Washington's stay at the house.

== See also ==
- List of Washington's Headquarters during the Revolutionary War
