= Brandywine Museum of Art =

American art museum

Coordinates: 39.8699°N 75.5930°W

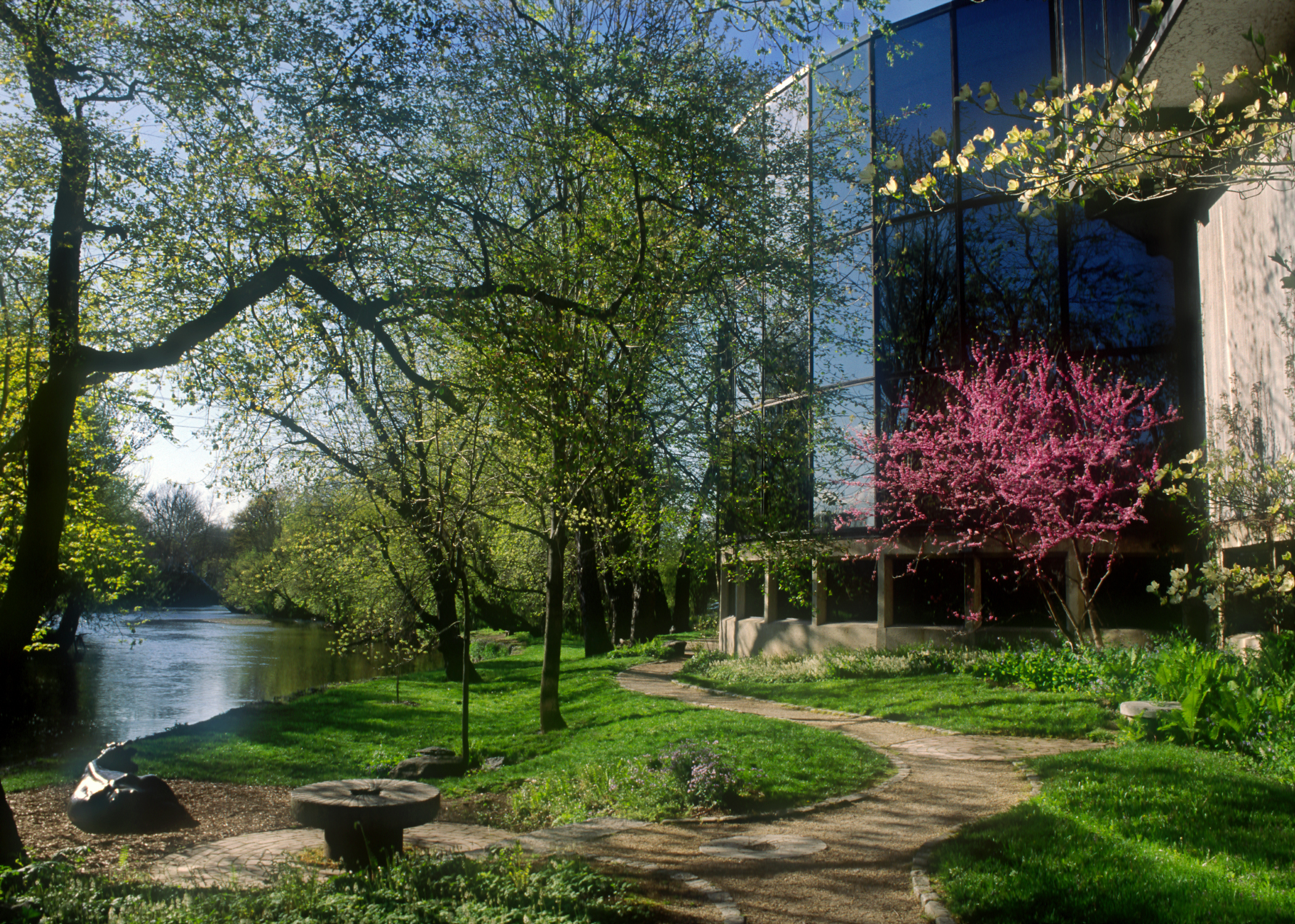
- Established: 1971
- Location: U.S. Route 1 Chadds Ford, Pennsylvania; United States
- Type: Art
- Website: Brandywine Museum of Art

The Brandywine Museum of Art (formerly the Brandywine River Museum) is a museum of regional and American art located on U.S. Route 1 in Chadds Ford, Pennsylvania on the banks of the Brandywine Creek. The museum showcases the work of Andrew Wyeth, a major American realist painter, and his family: his father N.C. Wyeth, illustrator of many children's classics; his sister Ann Wyeth McCoy, a composer and painter; and his son Jamie Wyeth, a contemporary American realist painter.

== History ==
The museum is a program of the Brandywine Conservancy & Museum of Art. It opened as the Brandywine River Museum in 1971 through the efforts of local painter "Frolic" Weymouth, who also served on its board. The facility had been Hoffman’s Mill, a gristmill built in 1864 that was among the conservancy’s first preservation efforts. Prior to its purchase by the conservancy, the facility had operated as the Lexington Lumber Company. (Its main competitor, further down the Brandywine in Chadds Ford, was the A. Duie Pyle Lumber Company.)

In 2014, the Brandywine River Museum changed its name to the Brandywine Museum of Art. In September 2021, the museum's lower level was flooded due to the remnants of Hurricane Ida with mechanical systems, lecture rooms, classrooms and office spaces damaged and estimates around $6 million. The museum still opened for the holiday season in limited capacity later in the year.

== Location ==
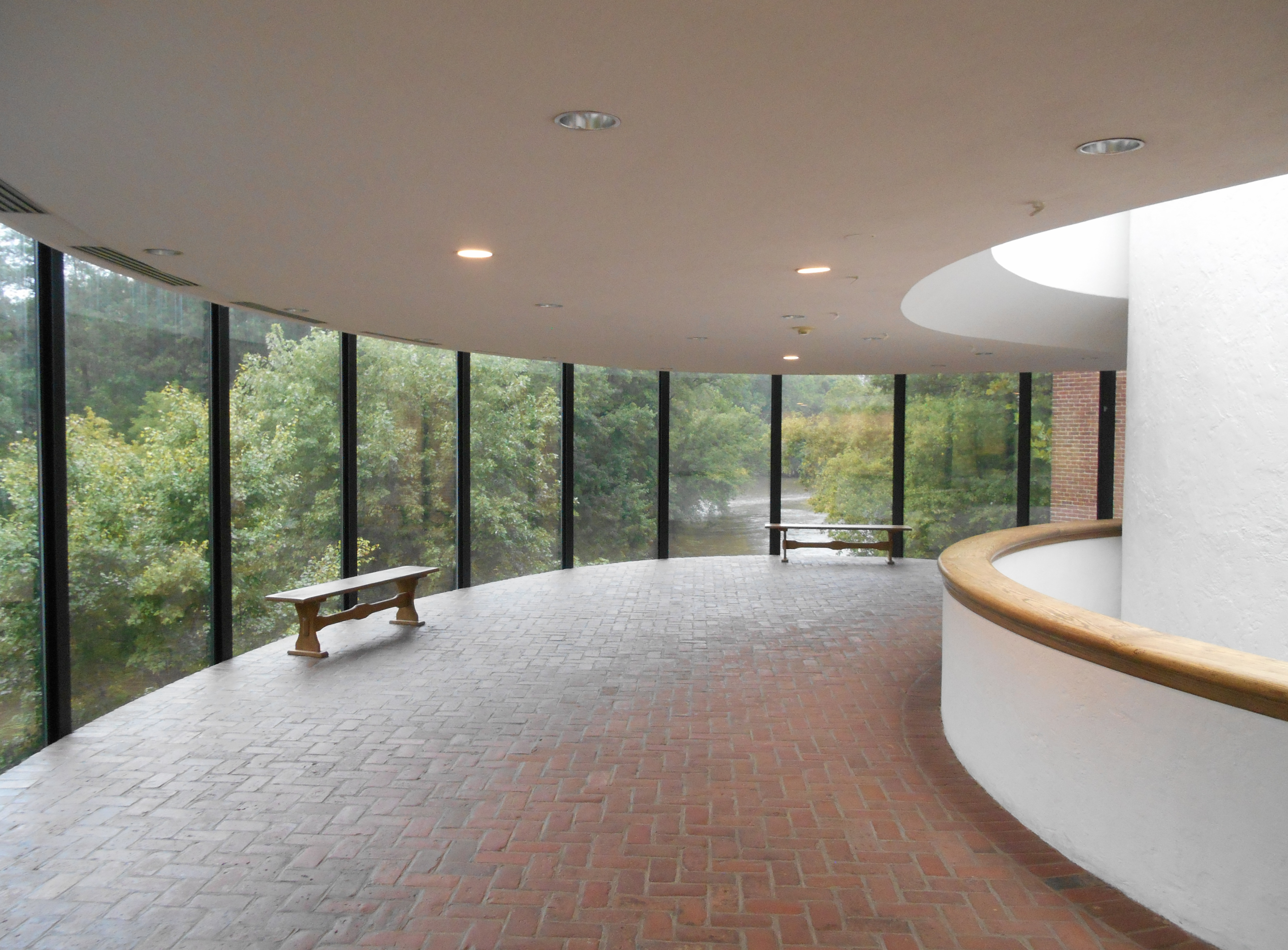
Glass-walled lobby in the Brandywine Museum of Art

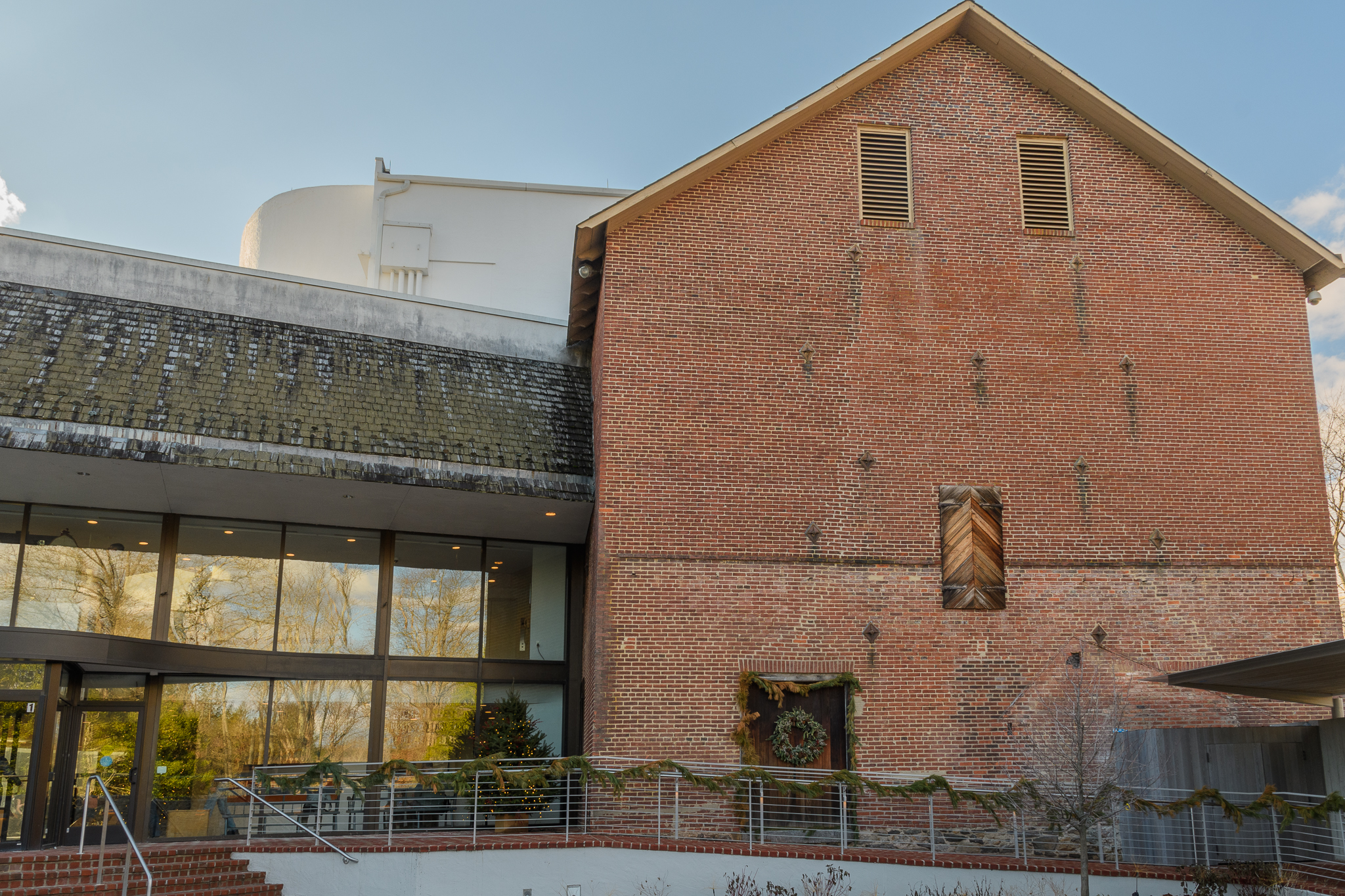
Northern elevation of original mill building, with entrance to museum on left.

The museum, sometimes referred to as the Wyeth Museum, is housed in a converted nineteenth-century mill overlooking the banks of the Brandywine Creek. The glass-walled lobby overlooks the river and countryside that inspired the Brandywine School earlier in the early 20th century.

== Contents ==
The museum's permanent collection features American illustration, still life works, and landscape painting by Jasper Francis Cropsey, Harvey Dunn, Peter Hurd, Maxfield Parrish, Howard Pyle, William Trost Richards, Barclay Rubincam, and Jessie Willcox Smith. It is also known for the collection and display of O-gauge model trains that have been on display since about 1972 and includes about 2,000 feet (610 m) of track and more than 1,000 pieces. The museum has also put on a critter ornament display and sale since 1971, with animal ornaments created with only natural materials; some were displayed at the White House in 1984.

== Wildflower and Native Plant Gardens ==
The Brandywine Wildflower and Native Plant Gardens are gardens at the museum. The gardens were established in 1974 to a design by F. M. Mooberry. In 1979 Lady Bird Johnson dedicated the gardens to Ford B. Draper and Henry A. Thouron for their contributions to the Brandywine Conservancy. The gardens include wildflowers, trees, and shrubs set within landscaped woodlands, wetland, flood plain, and meadow.

== See also ==
- List of single-artist museums
- List of botanical gardens in the United States
- Christian C. Sanderson Museum
- Farnsworth Art Museum
