= Chadds Ford, Pennsylvania =

Unincorporated community in Pennsylvania, US

- Census-designated place
- Location in Chester County and the U.S. state of Pennsylvania

- Location within Pennsylvania Location within the United States
- Coordinates: 39°52′19″N 75°35′29″W
- Country: United States
- State: Pennsylvania
- Counties: Delaware; Chester
- Townships: Chadds Ford; Pennsbury; Birmingham

Area
  - Total: 2.28 sq mi (5.91 km^{2})
  - Land: 2.25 sq mi (5.82 km^{2})
  - Water: 0.035 sq mi (0.09 km^{2})
- Elevation: 168 ft (51 m)

Population (2020)
  - Total: 1,476
  - Density: 657.3/sq mi (253.77/km^{2})
- Time zone: UTC−5 (Eastern (EST))
  - Summer (DST): UTC−4 (EDT)
- ZIP Code: 19317
- Area codes: 610/484
- FIPS code: 42-12440
- GNIS feature ID: 2805473

Chadds Ford is a census-designated place (CDP) in Delaware and Chester counties, Pennsylvania, United States, comprising the unincorporated communities of Chadds Ford and Chadds Ford Knoll. It was first listed as a CDP prior to the 2020 census.

The CDP is in westernmost Delaware County and southeastern Chester County, in the northwestern part of Chadds Ford Township, the eastern part of Pennsbury Township, and the southern corner of Birmingham Township. Brandywine Creek runs through the center of the CDP, forming first the boundary between Pennsbury and Birmingham township and then the boundary between Chester and Delaware counties. The village of Chadds Ford is in the northwest part of Chadds Ford Township, at the junction of U.S. Route 1 and Pennsylvania Route 100, while Chadds Ford Knoll and other suburban developments are in the Chester County parts of the CDP.

U.S. Route 1 leads east-northeast 12 miles (19 km) to Media and west-southwest 7 miles (11 km) to Kennett Square, while Route 100 leads north 8 miles (13 km) to West Chester and south 10 miles (16 km) to Wilmington, Delaware.

The center of Chadds Ford village constitutes the Chadds Ford Historic District, listed on the National Register of Historic Places. The Battle of Brandywine occurred at Chadds Ford during the American Revolutionary War. Chadds Ford was home to painter and illustrator N.C. Wyeth and was home to the Brandywine School artist colony. Other points of interest in the CDP include the Brandywine River Museum of Art, showcasing the work of the Wyeth family; the Christian C. Sanderson Museum; Painter's Folly, the summer residence of Howard Pyle; and the Chaddsford Winery.

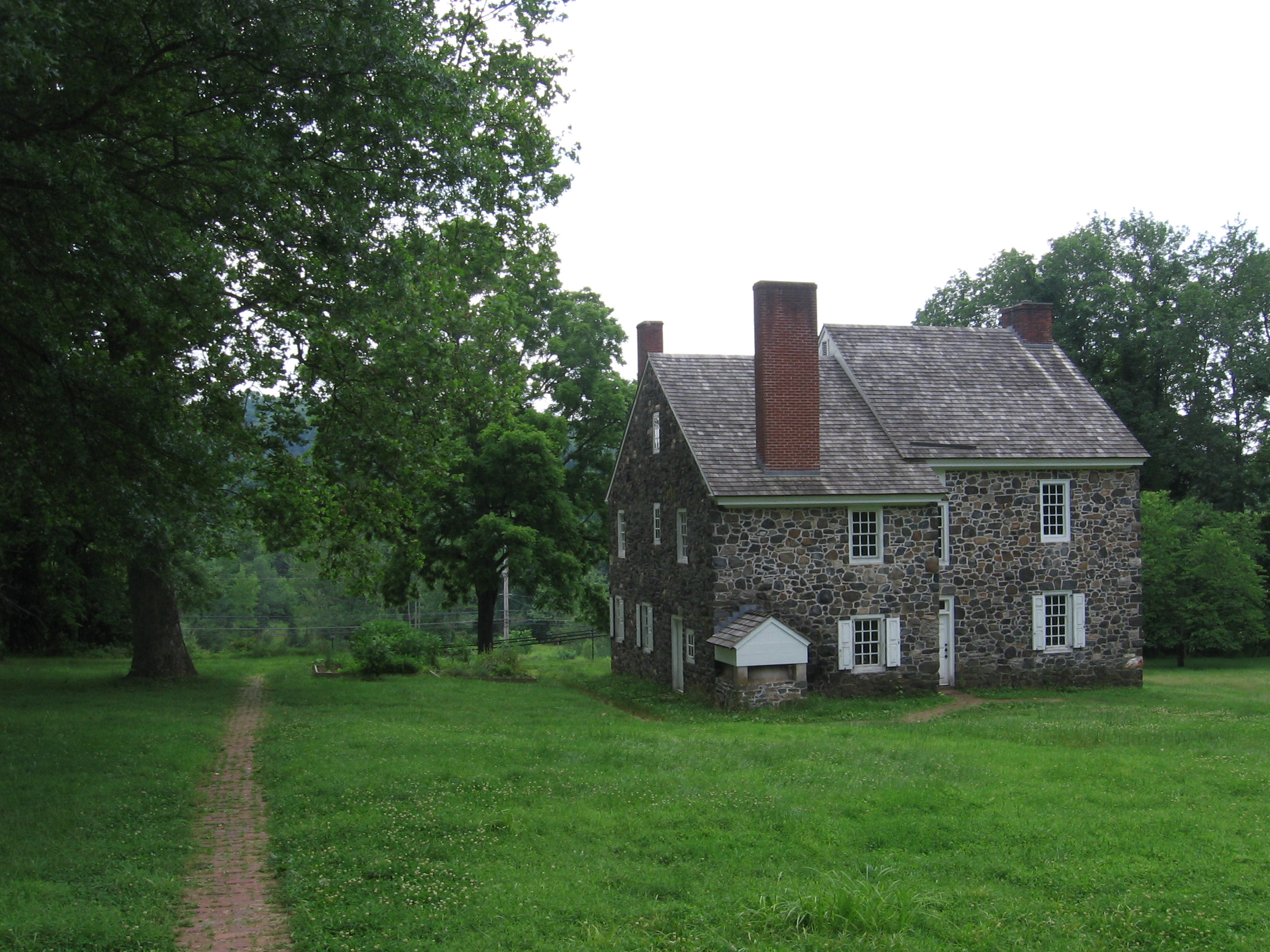
The Benjamin Ring House in Chadds Ford.

== Demographics ==
Historical population
Census	Pop.	Note	%±
2020	1,476		—
U.S. Decennial Census
