= List of U.S. National Historic Landmark ships, shipwrecks, and shipyards =

This is a list of the National Historic Landmarks in the United States that are ships, shipwrecks, or shipyards.

Of the more than 2,500 NHLs, about 5 percent are ships, shipwrecks, or shipyards.

The NHL ships, shipwrecks, and shipyards are distributed across 31 states, the District of Columbia, Puerto Rico, and the U.S.-associated state of Micronesia.

== Shipwrecks ==
	Name (according to NHL)	Image	State	Date declared	Museum association
1	Antonio Lopez	Antonio Lopez Shipwreck Site	Puerto Rico	9 December 1997	
2	USS Arizona (shipwreck)		Hawaii	5 May 1989	Shipwreck
3	Land Tortoise (radeau)		New York	5 August 1998	Shipwreck
4	Maple Leaf (shipwreck)		Florida	12 October 1994	Shipwreck
5	USS Monitor		North Carolina	23 June 1986	Shipwreck
6	Truk Lagoon Underwater Fleet, Truk Atoll	Divers next to the mast of the Unkai Maru wreck, Truk Lagoon, Micronesia	Micronesia	4 February 1985	Shipwrecks
7	USS Utah (shipwreck)	Capsizing at Pearl Harbor	Hawaii	5 May 1989	Shipwreck

== Ships ==
	Name (according to NHL)	Image	State	Date declared	Museum association
1	Adventure (schooner)	Adventure (schooner)	Massachusetts	19 April 1994	
2	Adventuress (schooner)	Adventuress (schooner)	Washington	11 April 1989	
3	USS Alabama (battleship)	USS Alabama at permanent berth	Alabama	14 January 1986	
4	USS Albacore (submarine)		New Hampshire	11 April 1989	Port of Portsmouth Maritime Museum
5	Alma (scow schooner)		California	7 July 1988	San Francisco Maritime National Historical Park
6	American Eagle (schooner)	American Eagle	Maine	4 December 1991	
7	Arthur Foss (tug)		Washington	11 April 1989	
8	SS Badger		Michigan	20 January 2016	
9	Balclutha (square-rigger)		California	4 February 1985	
10	Baltimore (tug)	Baltimore (tugboat)	Maryland	4 November 1993	
11	USS Becuna (submarine)		Pennsylvania	14 January 1986	
12	Belle of Louisville (river steamboat)		Kentucky	30 June 1989	
13	Berkeley (ferry)		California	14 December 1990	
14	Bowdoin (Arctic exploration schooner)		Maine	20 December 1989	
15	USS Bowfin (submarine)		Hawaii	14 January 1986	
16	USCGC Bramble (cutter)		Michigan	1 August 2012	former museum ship in Port Huron, Michigan, now MV Bramble
17	C. A. Thayer (schooner)		California	13 November 1966	
18	Captain Meriwether Lewis (dustpan dredge)		Nebraska	11 April 1989	
19	USS Cassin Young		Massachusetts	14 January 1986	Boston National Historical Park
20	Charles W. Morgan (bark)		Connecticut	13 November 1966	At Mystic Seaport Museum
21	Christeen (sloop)		New York	4 December 1991	
22	City of Milwaukee (Great Lakes car ferry)		Michigan	14 December 1990	
23	USS Cobia (submarine)		Wisconsin	14 January 1986	
24	USS Cod (submarine)		Ohio	14 January 1986	The USS COD Submarine Memorial is a National Historic Landmark and is docked in Cleveland, Ohio.
25	Columbia (excursion steamer)		Michigan	6 July 1992	
26	Constellation (frigate)		Maryland	23 May 1963	
27	USS Constitution (frigate)		Massachusetts	19 December 1960	Boston National Historical Park
28	Delta Queen (river steamboat)		Louisiana (Note: The Delta Queen, when given the NHL designation, was in Chattanooga, Tennessee, and is thus listed in Tennessee despite currently being in Louisiana.)	29 June 1989	
29	Deluge (fire fighting tug)		Louisiana	30 June 1989	
30	Donald B. (towboat)		Indiana	20 December 1989	
31	USS Drum (submarine)		Alabama	14 January 1986	
32	Duwamish (fireboat)		Washington	30 June 1989	
33	Edna E. Lockwood (bugeye)		Maryland	19 April 1994	
34	USS Edson		Michigan	21 June 1990	Relocated From New York to Michigan as museum ship in 2013.
35	Edward M. Cotter fireboat		New York	28 June 1996	Active duty with the Buffalo Fire Department
36	Elissa (bark)		Texas	14 December 1990	
37	Emma C. Berry (sloop)		Connecticut	12 October 1994	At Mystic Seaport Museum
38	Ernestina (schooner)		Massachusetts	14 December 1990	New Bedford Whaling National Historical Park
39	Eureka (double-ended ferry)		California	4 February 1985	
40	USCGC Fir		California	27 April 1992	
41	Fireboat No. 1		Washington	30 June 1989	
42	Fire Fighter		New York	30 June 1989	
43	George M. Verity (towboat)		Iowa	20 December 1989	
44	Governor Stone (schooner)		Florida	4 December 1991	
45	Grace Bailey (schooner)		Maine	4 December 1991	
46	HA. 19 (midget submarine)		Texas	30 June 1989	At National Museum of the Pacific War
47	USS Hazard (minesweeper)		Nebraska	14 January 1986	
48	Hercules (tug)	Hercules (tug)	California	17 January 1986	
49	Hilda M. Willing (skipjack)		Maryland	19 April 1994	
50	Hoga (YT-146)		Arkansas	30 June 1989	
51	USS Hornet (CVS-12) (aircraft carrier)		California	4 December 1991	
52	USCGC Ingham	Ingham at Point Pleasant in 1990	South Carolina	27 April 1992	formerly Patriot's Point relocating to USS Mohawk CGC Memorial Museum
53	USS Intrepid (CV-11)		New York	14 January 1986	Intrepid Sea, Air & Space Museum
54	Isaac H. Evans (schooner)	Isaac H. Evans	Maine	4 December 1991	
55	J. & E. Riggin (schooner)		Maine	4 December 1991	
56	Jeremiah O'Brien (Liberty ship)		California	14 January 1986	
57	USS Joseph P. Kennedy, Jr. (destroyer)		Massachusetts	29 June 1989	Battleship Cove
58	Kathryn (skipjack)		Maryland	19 April 1994	
59	USS Kidd (destroyer)		Louisiana	14 January 1986	
60	L. A. Dunton (schooner)		Connecticut	4 November 1993	At Mystic Seaport Museum
61	USS Laffey		South Carolina	14 January 1986	Patriot's Point
62	Lane Victory (Victory ship)	SS LaneVictory is in the foreground	California	14 December 1990	
63	Lettie G. Howard (schooner)		New York	11 April 1989	South Street Seaport Museum
64	USS Lexington	US Navy aircraft carrier USS Lexington anchored in the Gulf of Mexico	Texas	31 July 2003	
65	Lewis R. French (schooner)	Lewis R. French	Maine	4 December 1991	
66	Lightship No. 87, "Ambrose"		New York	11 April 1989	at South Street Seaport museum
67	Lightship No. 103, "Huron"		Michigan	20 December 1989	
68	Lightship No. 83, "Swiftsure"		Washington	11 April 1989	
69	Lightship No. 101, "Portsmouth"		Virginia	5 May 1989	
70	Lightship No. 112, "Nantucket"		Massachusetts	20 December 1989	was in Connecticut and New York; now owned by the United States Lightship Museum
71	Lightship No. 116, "Chesapeake"		Maryland	20 December 1989	at the Baltimore Maritime Museum
72	Lightship WAL-604, "Columbia"		Oregon	20 December 1989	
73	Lightship WAL-605, "Relief"		California	20 December 1989	
74	USS Lionfish (submarine)		Massachusetts	14 January 1986	Battleship Cove
75	Lone Star (towboat)		Iowa	20 December 1989	
76	Luna (tugboat)		Massachusetts	11 April 1989	
77	Majestic (showboat)		Ohio	20 December 1989	
78	USS Massachusetts (battleship)		Massachusetts	14 January 1986	Battleship Cove
79	Mayor Andrew Broaddus (lifesaving station)		Kentucky	30 June 1989	
80	Mercantile (schooner)		Maine	4 December 1991	
81	Milwaukee Clipper (passenger steamship)		Michigan	11 April 1989	
82	Modesty		New York	7 August 2001	at Long Island Maritime Museum
83	Montgomery (snagboat)		Alabama	30 June 1989	
84	Nash (harbor tug)	Nash (tugboat)	New York	4 December 1991	at H. Lee White Marine Museum
85	USS Nautilus (nuclear submarine)		Connecticut	20 May 1982	Submarine Force Library and Museum
86	Nellie Crockett (buy-boat)		Maryland	19 April 1994	
87	Nenana (river steamboat)	Nenana in 1988	Alaska	5 May 1989	
88	USS North Carolina		North Carolina	14 January 1986	
89	USS Olympia		Pennsylvania	29 January 1964	
90	PT 617		Massachusetts	20 December 1989	at PT Boat Museum (Battleship Cove)
91	PT 796		Massachusetts	14 January 1986	at PT Boat Museum (Battleship Cove)
92	USS Pampanito (submarine)		California	14 January 1986	
93	Philadelphia (gundelo)		District of Columbia	20 January 1961	within National Museum of American History
94	Potomac (Presidential yacht)		California	14 December 1990	
95	Priscilla (sloop)		New York	17 February 2006	at Long Island Maritime Museum
96	Ralph J. Scott (fireboat)		California	30 June 1989	May be part of the Los Angeles Maritime Museum
97	Rebecca T. Ruark (skipjack)		Maryland	31 July 2003	
98	Roseway (schooner)		Maine	25 September 1997	
99	Sabino (passenger steamboat)		Connecticut	5 October 1992	At Mystic Seaport Museum
100	Savannah (nuclear ship)		Virginia	17 July 1991	
101	USS Sequoia (presidential yacht)		District of Columbia	23 December 1987	
102	Sergeant Floyd (towboat)		Iowa	5 May 1989	
103	USS Silversides (submarine)		Michigan	14 January 1986	
104	Star of India (bark)		California	13 November 1966	
105	Stephen Taber (schooner)		Maine	4 December 1991	
106	USS The Sullivans		New York	14 January 1986	Buffalo and Erie County Naval & Military Park
107	USCGC Taney (Coast Guard cutter)		Maryland	7 June 1988	at the Baltimore Maritime Museum
108	USS Texas		Texas	8 December 1976	
109	Ticonderoga (side-paddle-wheel lakeboat)		Vermont	29 January 1964	at the Shelburne Museum
110	USS Torsk (submarine)	USS Torsk docked at the Baltimore Maritime Museum	Maryland	14 January 1986	at the Baltimore Maritime Museum
111	German submarine U-505		Illinois	29 June 1989	Museum of Science and Industry in Chicago
112	Victory Chimes (schooner)	Victory Chimes	Maine	25 September 1997	
113	Virginia V (steamboat)		Washington	5 October 1992	
114	W.P. Snyder Jr. (towboat)	W.P. SNYDER, JR. (steamboat)	Ohio	29 June 1989	
115	W.T. Preston (snagboat)		Washington	5 May 1989	
116	William B. Tennison (buy-boat)	William B. Tennison	Maryland	19 April 1994	
117	William M. Black (dredge)	William M. Black (dredge)	Iowa	27 April 1992	National Mississippi River Museum & Aquarium
118	USS Yorktown		South Carolina	14 January 1986	Patriot's Point

States having no ships among their NHLs are Arizona, Colorado, Delaware, Georgia, Idaho, Kansas, Minnesota, Montana, Nevada, New Jersey, New Mexico, North Dakota, Oklahoma, Rhode Island, South Dakota, Tennessee, Utah, West Virginia, and Wyoming.

== Shipyards ==
	Name (according to NHL)	Image	State	Date declared
1	Boston Naval Shipyard	Boston Naval Shipyard in 1958	Massachusetts	
2	Drydock Number One, Norfolk Naval Shipyard		Virginia	
3	Mare Island Naval Shipyard		California	
4	Puget Sound Naval Shipyard	Bremerton Shipyard	Washington	

== Previous landmarks ==
	Name (according to NHL)	Image	State	Date declared	Notes
1	USS Clamagore (submarine)		South Carolina		Formally a museum ship at Patriot's Point in South Carolina until being sold for scrap in 2022. The landmark designation was withdrawn on September 2, 2024.
2	Falls of Clyde (four-masted oil tanker)		Hawaii		Was operated as a museum ship but fell into such a state of disrepair that bids to scrap the ship are being seen. The landmark designation was withdrawn on December 13, 2024.
3	Goldenrod (showboat)		Missouri		Destroyed by fire in 2017 and later scrapped. The landmark designation was withdrawn on December 11, 2023.
4	Inaugural (minesweeper)	USS Inaugural hulk after the Great Flood of 1993	Missouri		Hull breached during 1993 flood; wreck deemed a total loss. The landmark designation was withdrawn on August 7, 2001.
5	President (riverboat)		Illinois		Ship disassembled with intent to remove it to a lake environment; parts are in deteriorating condition. The landmark designation was withdrawn on July 27, 2011.
6	Ste. Claire (passenger steamboat)		Michigan		Upper Decks were destroyed by fire in 2018. The landmark designation was withdrawn on December 11, 2023.
7	Wapama (steam schooner)		California		Dry rot and general deterioration of the hull resulted in the ship being dismantled in 2013. The landmark designation was withdrawn on February 27, 2015.

== See also ==
- List of National Historic Landmarks by state
