= Dennett Garrison =

Historic house in Maine, United States

- U.S. National Register of Historic Places
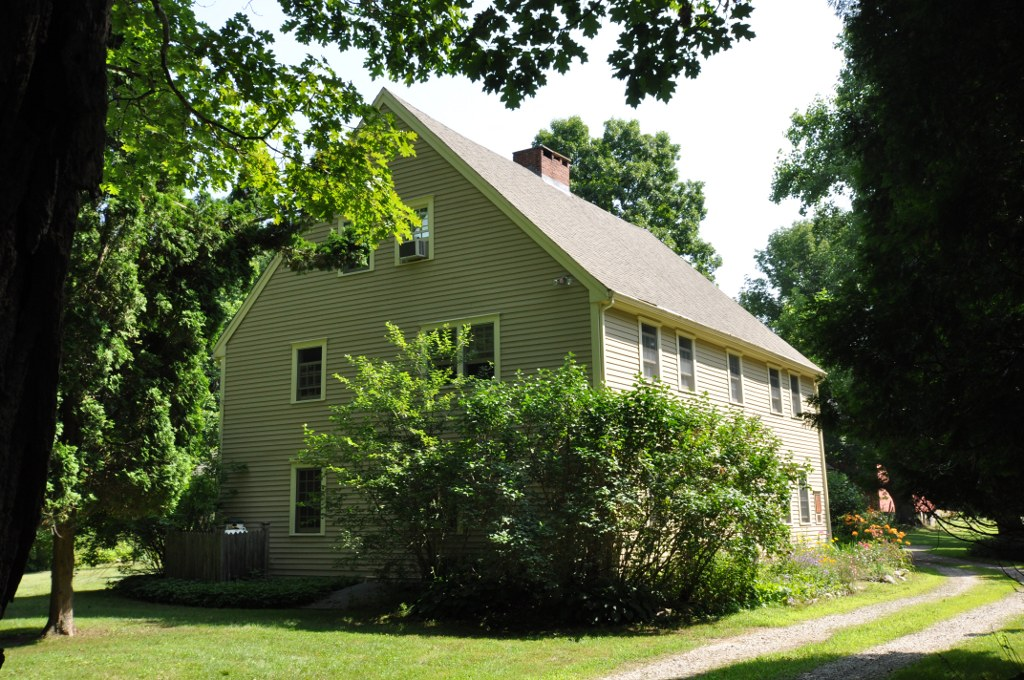

- Location within Maine Location within the United States
- Location: 100 Dennett Rd., Kittery, Maine
- Coordinates: 43°6′3″N 70°45′35″W
- Area: 0.5 acres (0.20 ha)
- Built: 1710
- Built by: Dennett, John
- Architectural style: Garrison
- NRHP reference No.: 78000334
- Added to NRHP: December 22, 1978

The Dennett Garrison is a historic First Period house at 100 Dennett Road in Kittery, Maine. With an estimated construction date of 1710, it is one of the oldest surviving buildings in the state of Maine. When listed on the National Register of Historic Places in 1978, it was still owned by descendants of its builder, John Dennett.

== Description and history ==
The Dennett Garrison is located on the northeast side of Dennett Street, a historically significant road leading northwest (roughly paralleling the Piscataqua River) and inland from the early coastal settlements of Kittery. It is a 2 1/2-story timber-frame structure, five bays wide, with a side gable roof, central chimney (once larger but now reduced in size), and clapboard siding. The front door is a four-panel door set in a simple frame, and the windows are generally replacement sash (some dating to the late 18th century) for what would have originally been casement windows. The interior of the house has rooms with low ceilings typical of the early colonial period, and large fireplaces. The walls of the first floor are hand-hewn hemlock, dovetailed and treenailed in place; the upper floor walls are oak.

The land on which the house stands was granted in 1661 to Christian Remick, and bought by John Dennett in 1698. It is not known exactly when Dennett built the house; it is mentioned in a 1720 document in which it is identified as a garrison house, or place of refuge in case of Native American attack. It has traditionally been given a construction date of 1710.

== See also ==
- National Register of Historic Places listings in York County, Maine
