= National Register of Historic Places listings in Maine =

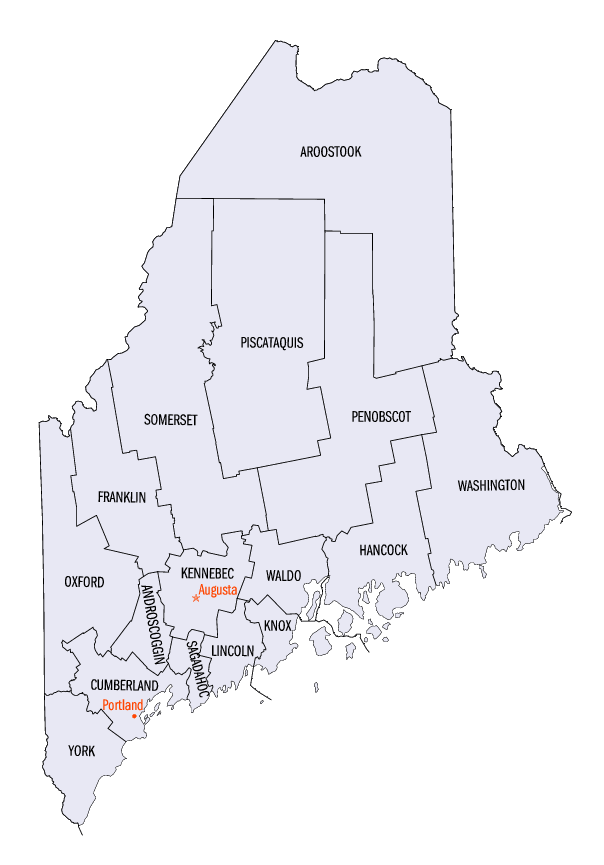
Map of Maine's counties

There are approximately 1,600 properties and districts listed on the National Register of Historic Places in the U.S. state of Maine. Each of the state's 16 counties has more than forty listings on the National Register.

This National Park Service list is complete through NPS recent listings posted September 11, 2026.

== Current listings by county ==
The following are approximate tallies of current listings by county. These counts are based on entries in the National Register Information Database as of April 24, 2008 and new weekly listings posted since then on the National Register of Historic Places web site. There are frequent additions to the listings and occasional delistings and the counts here are approximate and not official. New entries are added to the official Register on a weekly basis. Also, the counts in this table exclude boundary increase and decrease listings which only modify the area covered by an existing property or district, although carrying a separate National Register reference number.

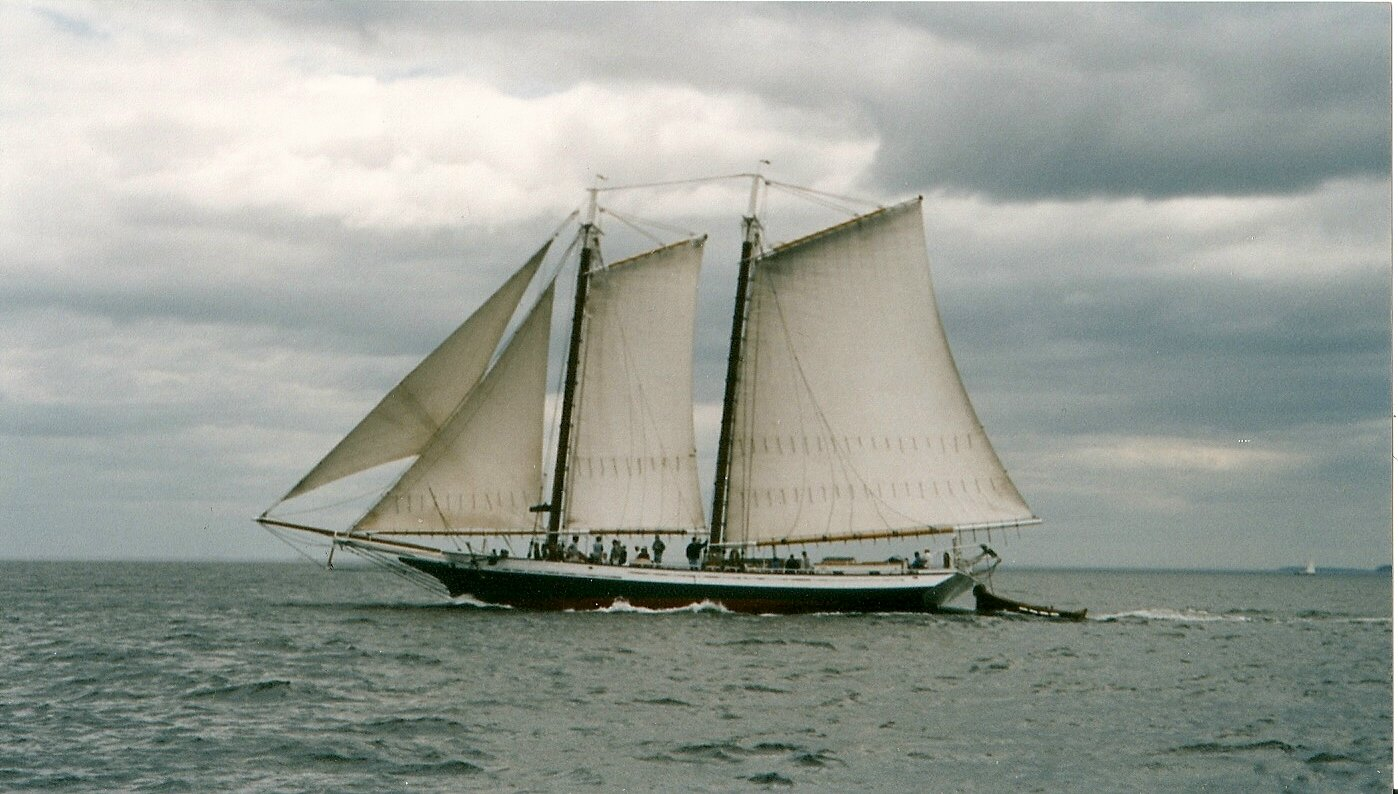
Grace Bailey (schooner), in Knox County

	County	# of Sites
1	Androscoggin	108
2	Aroostook	60
3.1	Cumberland: Portland	100
3.2	Cumberland: Other	151
3.3	Cumberland: Total	251
4	Franklin	52
5	Hancock	136
6	Kennebec	134
7	Knox	97
8	Lincoln	107
9	Oxford	103
10	Penobscot	112
11	Piscataquis	59
12	Sagadahoc	64
13	Somerset	60
14	Waldo	68
15	Washington	101
16	York	185
(duplicates)		(9)
Total:		1,688

== See also ==
- List of historical societies in Maine
- List of National Historic Landmarks in Maine
- List of bridges on the National Register of Historic Places in Maine
