= List of National Natural Landmarks in Maine =

There are 14 National Natural Landmarks in Maine.

Maine National Natural Landmarks (clickable map)

Name	Image	Date	Location	County	Ownership	Description
Appleton Bog Atlantic White Cedar Stand		1984		Knox	private	A large peatland with continuous forest cover and well-developed hummock-and- hollow topography.
Carrying Place Cove Bog		1980		Washington	state	A tombolo that has been eroded by the sea.
Colby-Marston Preserve		1973		Kennebec	private	Northern sphagnum bog located in a deep kettle hole, the sphagnum mat exceeds a depth of 40 feet (12 m).
Crystal Bog		1973	46.034472°N 68.330394°W	Aroostook	private	An undisturbed, sphagnum bog considered one of the largest and finest in Maine.
Gulf Hagas		1968	45.4841°N 69.323°W	Piscataquis	federal (Appalachian Trail)	Waterfalls, cliffs, and growth of spruce-fir forest on the gorge walls give the site unusual scenic beauty.
The Hermitage	The Hermitage (Maine)	1977		Piscataquis	federal (Appalachian Trail)	One of the few undisturbed, old-growth white pine stands remaining in New England.
Monhegan Island	Monhegan Harbor	1966	43.762222°N 69.320278°W	Lincoln	private	Dense, almost pure stands of red spruce and over 400 species of wildflower.
Mount Bigelow (Maine)		1975	45.147277°N 70.289234°W	Franklin, Somerset	state	Exceptionally scenic and wild, with some of the best summit views in the eastern United States.
Mount Katahdin	Mount Katahdin	1967	45.904354°N 68.921274°W	Piscataquis	state (Baxter State Park)	Kames, eskers, drumlins, kettleholes, moraines, and erratics provide a complete illustration of glacial geology.
New Gloucester Black Gum Stand		1975	43.979177°N 70.33552°W,	Cumberland	private	A small, remnant, forested swamp dominated mostly by virgin black gum.
No. 5 Bog and Jack Pine Stand		1984	45.532352°N 70.280986°W	Somerset	state, private	The only large, intermontane peatland and one of the few expansive, virgin landscapes in the northeastern United States.
Orono Bog		1973	44.86907°N 68.725668°W	Penobscot	municipal, private	A classic northern sphagnum bog.
Passadumkeag Marsh and Bogland		1973	45.194092°N 68.561578°W	Penobscot	private	One of the largest, unspoiled wetlands in the state of Maine.
Penny Pond-Joe Pond Complex		1973	44.407626°N 69.827820°W	Kennebec	private	Kettle hole bogs and ponds.

== See also ==
- List of National Historic Landmarks in Maine
