= American Eagle (schooner) =

- American Eagle (Schooner)
- U.S. National Register of Historic Places
- U.S. National Historic Landmark
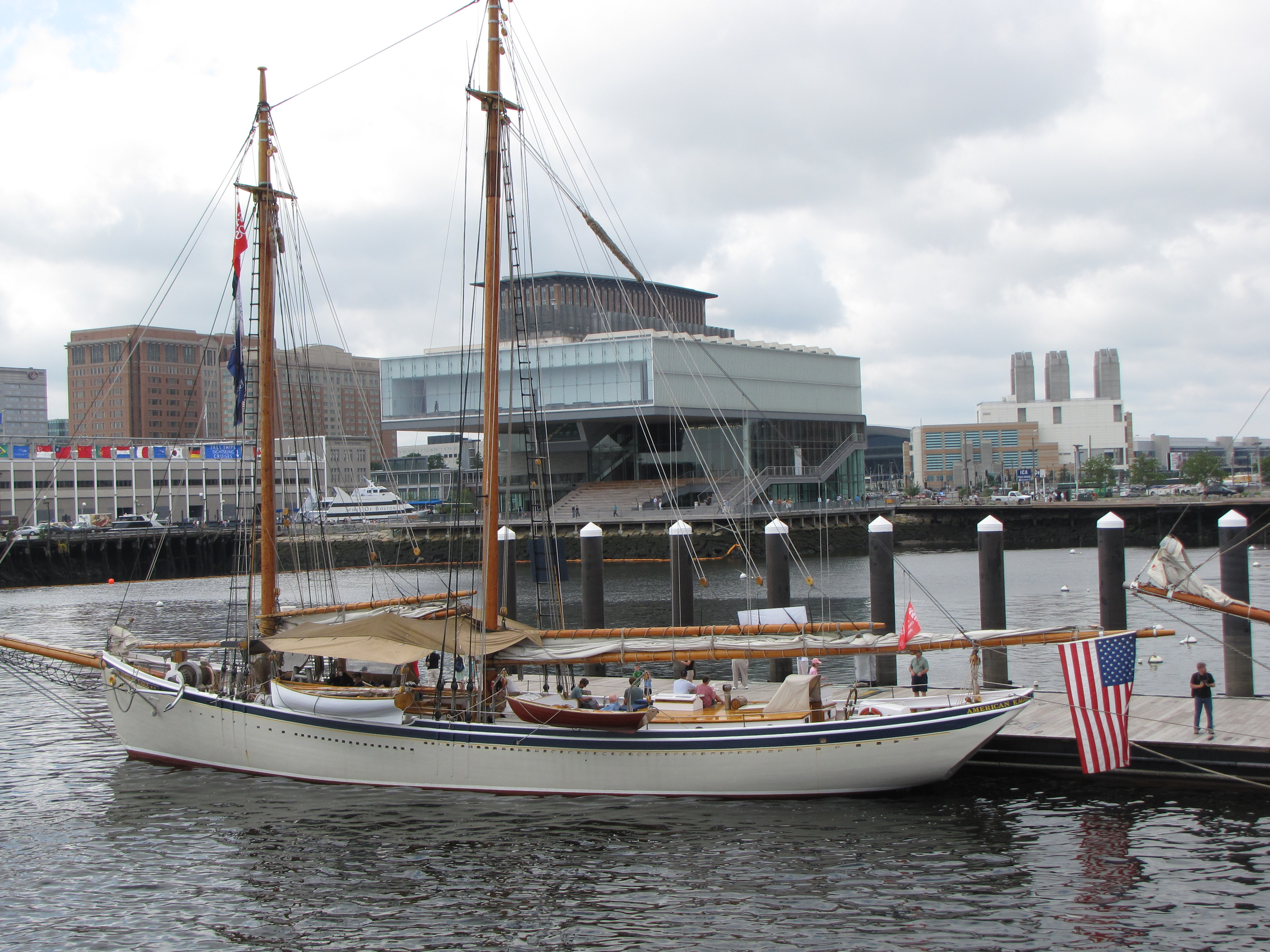

- Location within Maine Location within the United States
- Location: Rockland Harbor, Rockland, Maine
- Coordinates: 44°6′41.33″N 69°6′11.64″W
- Built: 1930
- Architect: United Sail Loft Co.
- NRHP reference No.: 91002064

Significant dates
- Added to NRHP: December 4, 1991
- Designated NHL: December 4, 1992

The American Eagle, originally Andrew and Rosalie, is a two-masted schooner serving the tourist trade out of Rockland, Maine. Launched in 1930 at Gloucester, Massachusetts, she was the last auxiliary schooner (powered by both sail and engine) to be built in that port, and one of Gloucester's last sail-powered fishing vessels. A National Historic Landmark, she is also the oldest known surviving vessel of the type, which was supplanted not long afterward by modern trawlers.

== History ==
Andrew and Rosalie was built in 1930 by the United Sail Loft Company in Gloucester, for Patrick Murphy, a local fishing master, and was named for his children. The ship was used in fishing operations by his family until 1941, when it was sold to the Empire Fish Company, who renamed her American Eagle. They converted her for use as a trawler, a role she served, mainly under the ownership of the Piscitello brothers, until 1983.

She was purchased in 1984 by John Foss, who had recently restored the Lewis R. French (also a National Historic Landmark), and was restored at the North End Shipyard at Rockland, Maine. Foss rebuilt her for the cruise ship trade, and she now spends summers cruising Penobscot Bay in Maine on 3-7 day cruises, though she generally takes one longer cruise per year to places like Grand Manan Island in Canada. She is one of the few schooners in Maine that go on longer cruises, and one of the few that go offshore looking for whales. She also generally returns to Gloucester every year.

American Eagle was listed on the National Register of Historic Places in 1991, and was declared a National Historic Landmark in 1992. She is the sole surviving representative of the transitional period between traditional sail-powered fishing vessels and more modern trawlers, having been built about the same time as the Gertrude L. Thebaud, a sailing schooner.

The historic ship ran aground August 3, 2016 in Somes Sound, Mount Desert, Maine during a windjammer regatta. 25 passengers were evacuated with the crew remaining aboard to await high tide to refloat the ship.

== Description ==
American Eagle is a single-deck two-masted schooner, measuring 76.4 feet (23.3 m) in length between the perpendiculars, and a total length of 90 feet (27 m). Her beam is 19.3 feet (5.9 m), and her hold depth is 10 feet (3.0 m). She is registered at 70 gross tons and 47 net tons, displacing 118 tons. The frame and planking are oak, the ceiling is fir, and the decking is pine. She currently has a schooner rigging, although she did not for much of her fishing career. The hold has been fitted with fourteen double-occupancy passenger cabins.

== See also ==
- List of schooners
- List of National Historic Landmarks in Maine
- National Register of Historic Places listings in Knox County, Maine
