= Lone Star (towboat) =

Towboat in LeClaire, Iowa, United States

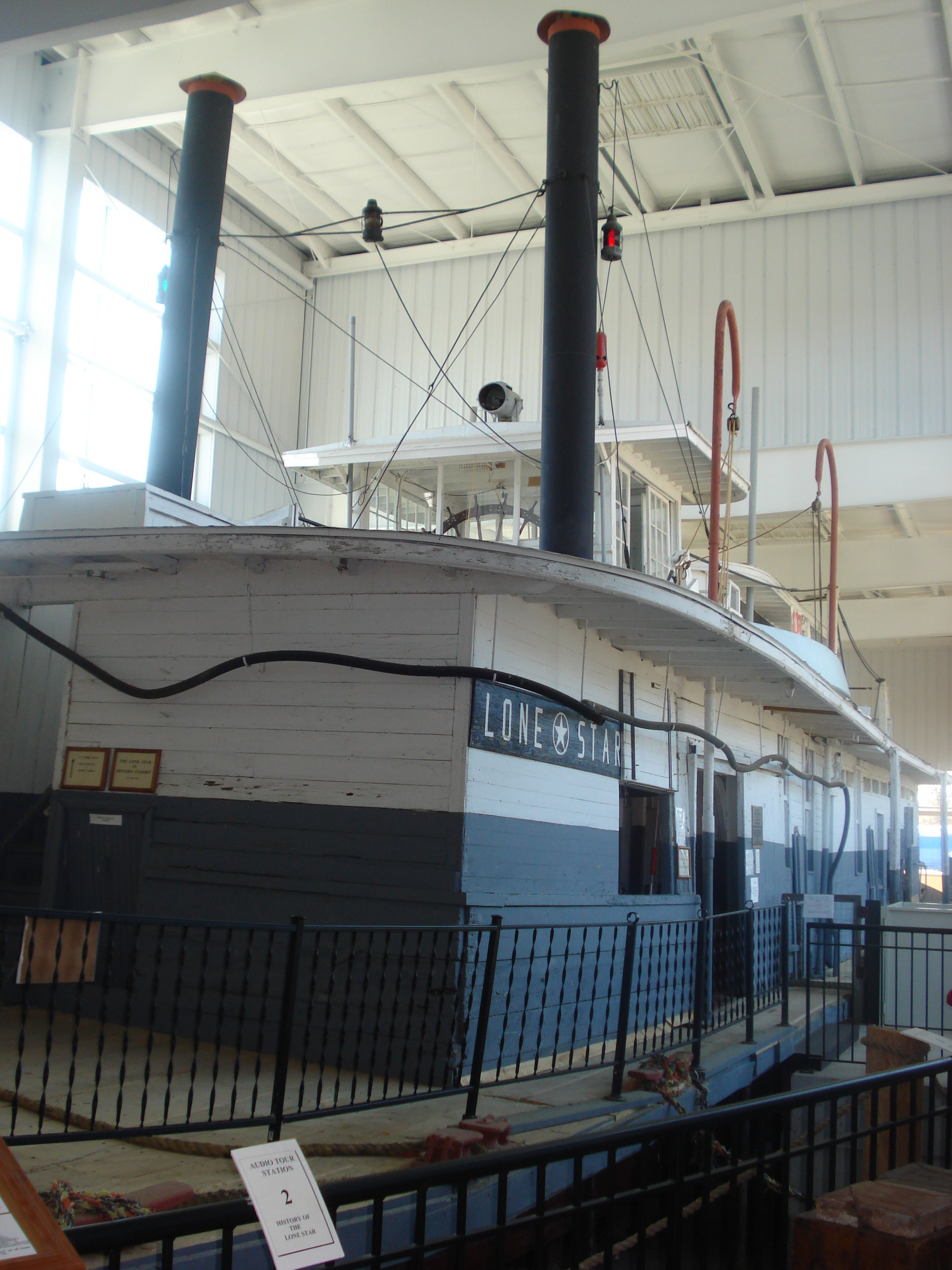

History

United States
- Name: Lone Star
- Launched: 1868
- Out of service: 21 April 1968
- Status: Museum ship

General characteristics
- Length: 68.4 ft (20.8 m) (as built); 84 ft (26 m) (1890); 90 ft (27 m) (1922)
- Beam: 19.3 ft (5.9 m) (as built); 20 ft (6.1 m) (1890); 24.5 ft (7.5 m) (1922)
- Depth: 3.2 ft (0.98 m) (as built); 4.1 ft (1.2 m) (1922)
- Lone Star (tow boat)
- U.S. National Register of Historic Places
- U.S. National Historic Landmark
- Location within Iowa Location within the United States
- Location: LeClaire, Iowa
- Coordinates: 41°35′53.89″N 90°20′33.2″W
- Built: 1868
- Architect: Multiple
- NRHP reference No.: 89002461

Significant dates
- Added to NRHP: 20 December 1989
- Designated NHL: 20 December 1989

Lone Star is a wooden hull, steam-powered stern-wheeled towboat in LeClaire, Iowa, United States. She is dry docked and on display at the Buffalo Bill Museum in LeClaire. Built in 1868, she is the oldest of three surviving steam-powered towboats, and the only one with a wooden hull. She was declared a National Historic Landmark on 20 December 1989.

== Description ==
Lone Star has a wood frame hull 90 feet (27 m) long, with pointed bow, flat bottom and hard chine. With the sternwheel added, the total vessel length is 105 feet (32 m). She has a beam of 24.5 feet (7.5 m) and a hold depth of 4.1 feet (1.2 m). The internal hogging truss system is typical of boats of the period. The hull is divided internally into three watertight compartments. It has a two-deck superstructure, with the main deck housing the propelling machinery and steam boilers, with coal bins forward, boilers in the center, and engines aft. An upper deck above the boilers that houses the pilot house and crew quarters.

== History ==
Lone Star came off the ways at Lyons, Iowa in 1869. Originally the boat was a wood-burning side-wheeler, operated as a short-run packet. In 1890 she was remodeled and reconfigured as a stern-wheeler, for use as towboat. Lone Star was remodeled a second time in 1899 at the Kahlke Boat Yards in Rock Island, Illinois. In 1922 she was again altered, for use in dredging operations. On 21 April 1968, Lone Star was placed out of service. She was the last running and is now the last remaining intact wood hull paddlewheel boat that plied the Mississippi River.

== Photo gallery ==
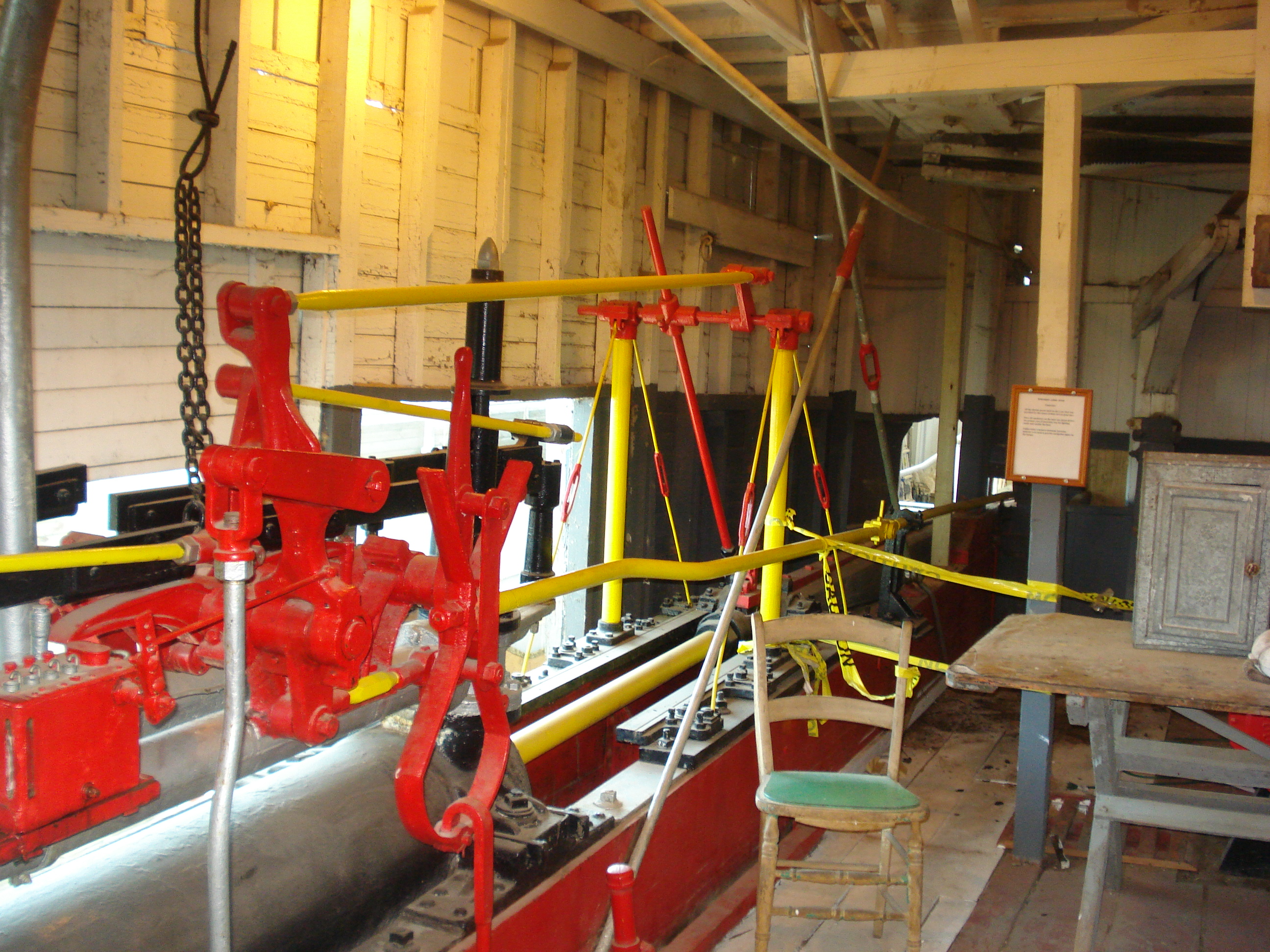
Lone Star's steam engine

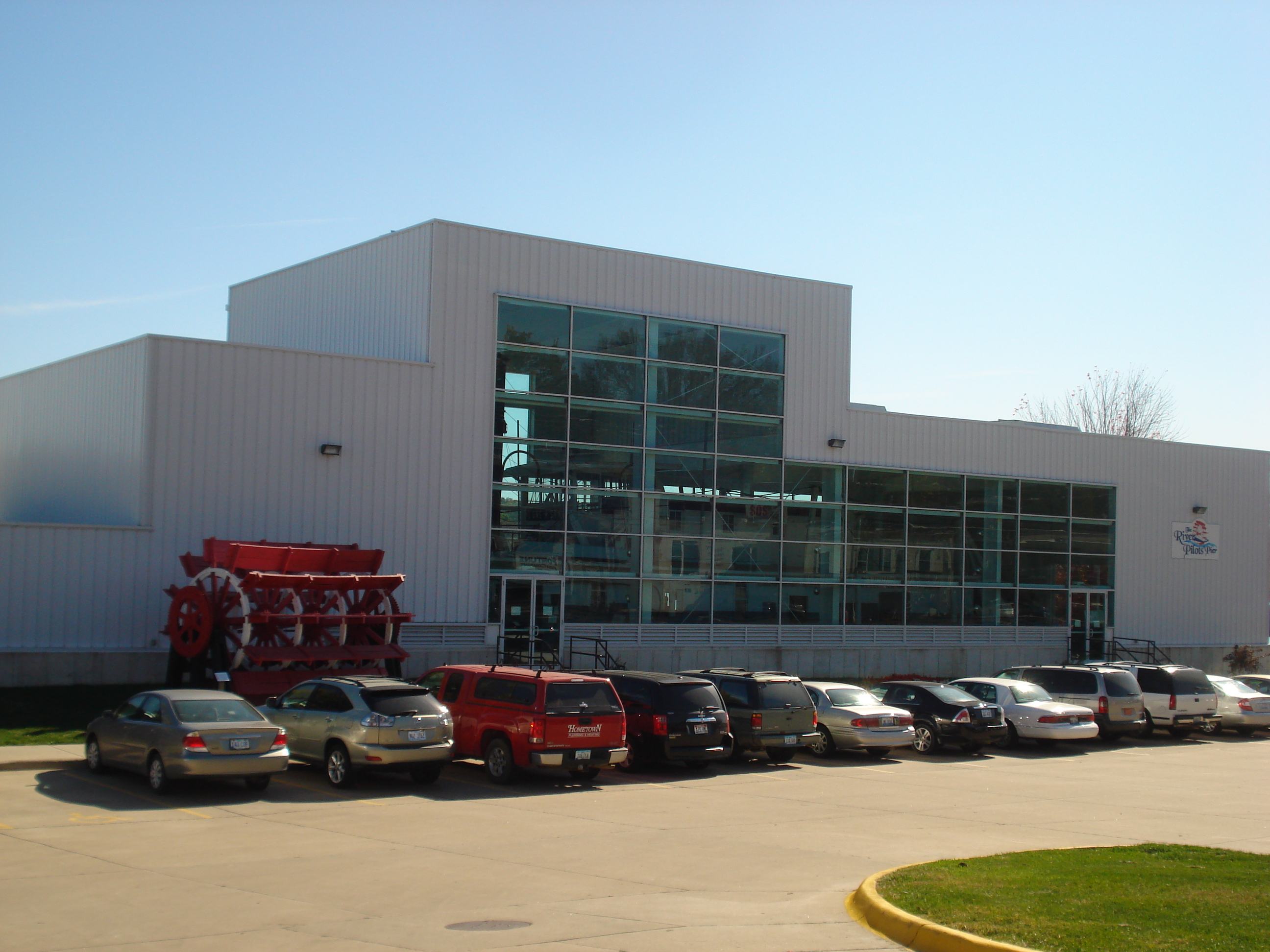
Lone Star's glass and steel enclosure

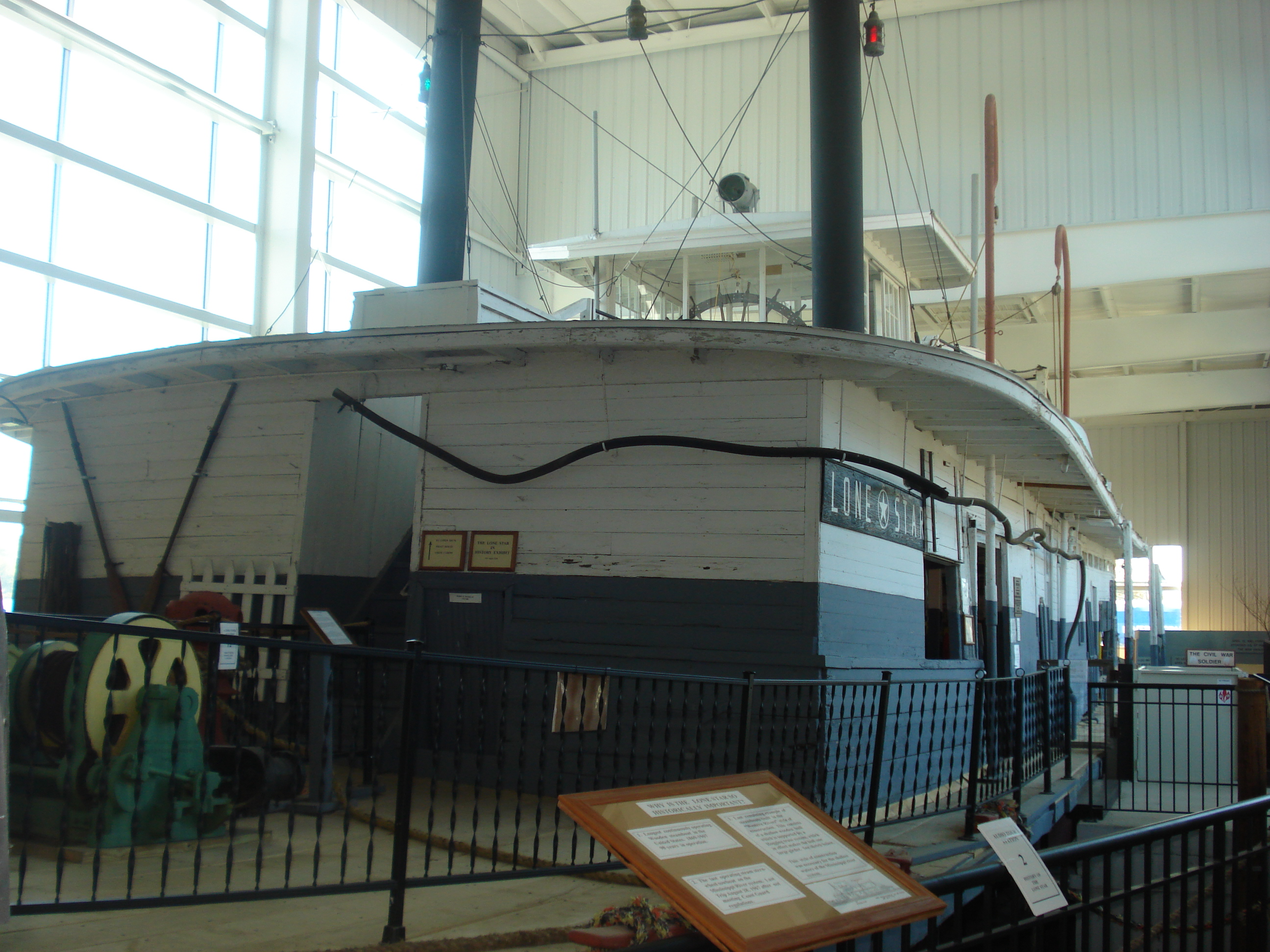

== See also ==
- List of National Historic Landmarks in Iowa
- National Register of Historic Places listings in Scott County, Iowa
- List of U.S. National Historic Landmark ships, shipwrecks, and shipyards
