= Harpswell Meetinghouse =

Historic church in Maine, United States

- U.S. National Register of Historic Places
- U.S. National Historic Landmark
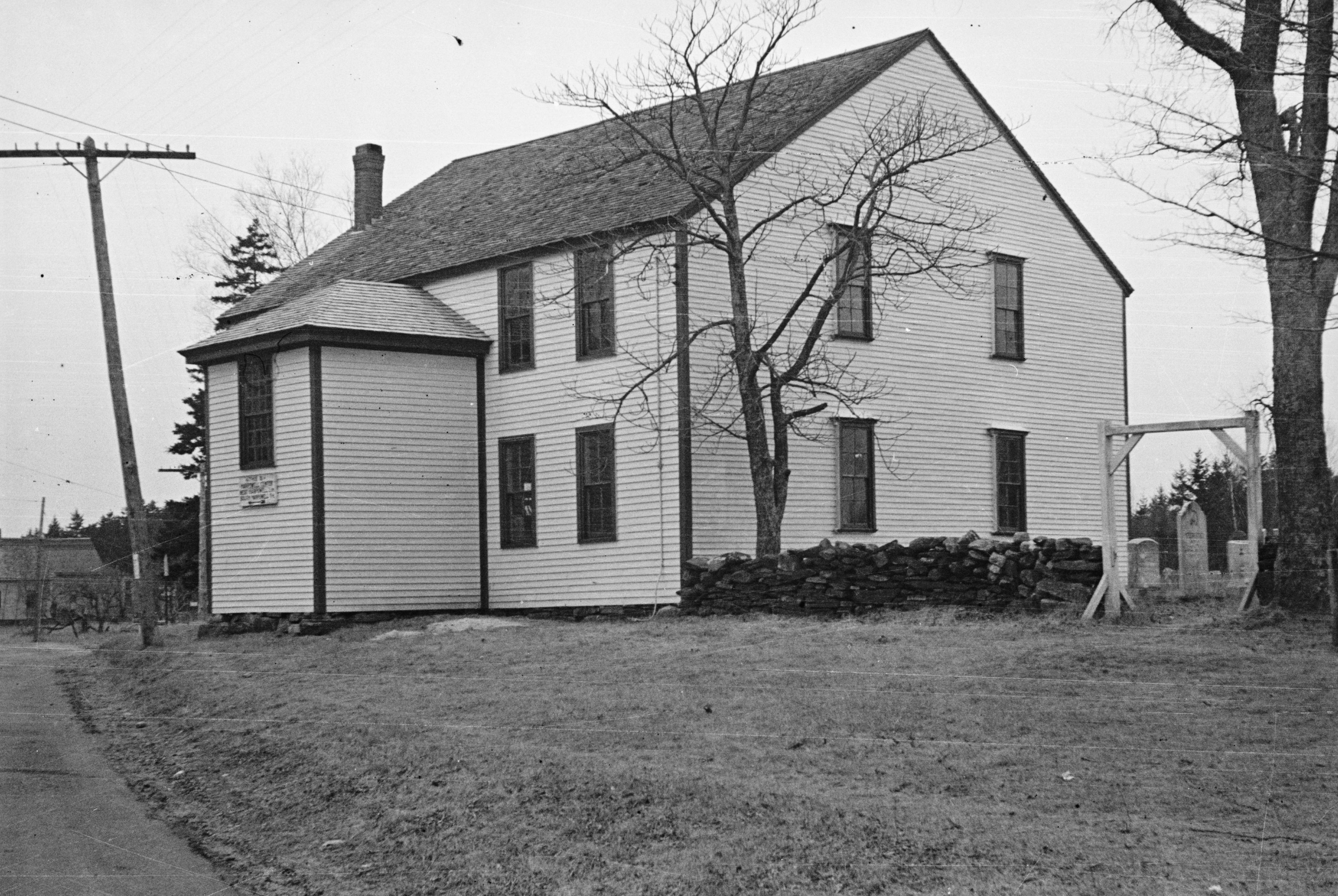
- Exterior of the meetinghouse

- Location within Maine Location within the United States
- Nearest city: Harpswell, Maine
- Coordinates: 43°47′56″N 69°59′15″W
- Area: less than one acre
- Built: 1757
- Architect: Eaton, Elisha
- Architectural style: Colonial
- NRHP reference No.: 68000014

Significant dates
- Added to NRHP: November 24, 1968
- Designated NHL: November 24, 1968

The Harpswell Meetinghouse is a historic colonial meeting house on Maine State Route 123 in Harpswell, Maine. Built in 1757-59 to provide space for both religious services and town meetings, it is a little-altered and well-preserved example of a once-common form, and is the oldest such surviving building in the state of Maine. It was designated a National Historic Landmark in 1968.

== Description and history ==
The Harpswell Meetinghouse is set on the west side of Maine State Route 123, in the center of Harpswell, about 9 miles (14 km) south of Brunswick. It is a two-story wood frame structure, set on a rubble stone foundation, with clapboard siding and a side gable roof. The main block is about 35 by 40 feet (11 m × 12 m), and there is a small 10 by 15 feet (3.0 m × 4.6 m) projecting section at the center of the front facade, which houses the stairwell which gives access to the second-floor gallery.

The interior of the meetinghouse is a single large chamber with a gallery level on three sides. The fourth side, one of the long walls has the pulpit at its center, opposite the entrance. This arrangement was typical in New England meetinghouses until the early 19th century. Also typical of the period are the soffits and sounding board which frame the pulpit area. The walls are finished with wooden wainscoting and plaster over lath. The building was originally filled with box pews, but these were removed in the 19th century.

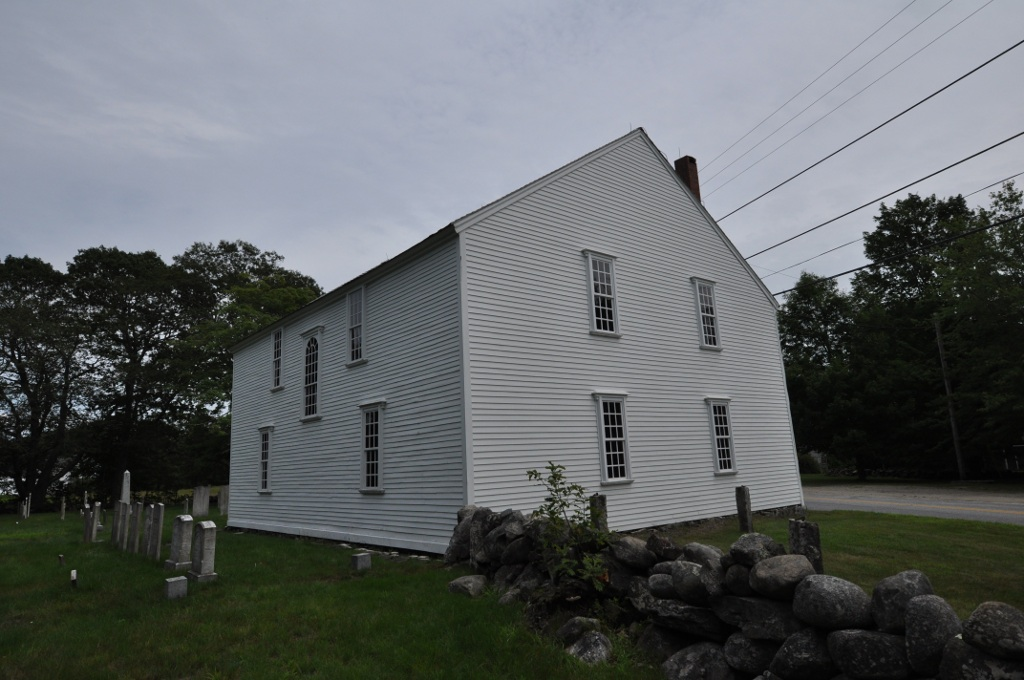

The Harpswell parish was organized in 1751, when the area was still part of Yarmouth. Its first minister was the Reverend Elisha Eaton, was appointed in 1753. Construction of the meeting house was begun in 1757, a job in which Eaton's son, also named Elisha, assisted, providing sashes and frames. The building was not ready for use until 1759, and was still reported to be unfinished in 1774. It served as both a religious and civic meeting space until 1844, and then stood vacant for 14 years before the town adapted it for its exclusive use. It was used to house town offices, and as a polling place. In 1958 a painstaking restoration was begun, replacing plaster with carefully color-matched replacements, and custom-building windows to match the originals.

The meetinghouse was designated a National Historic Landmark and was listed on the National Register of Historic Places in 1968.

== See also ==
- List of National Historic Landmarks in Maine
- National Register of Historic Places listings in Cumberland County, Maine
