= Lewis R. French (schooner) =

1871 schooner launched in Maine

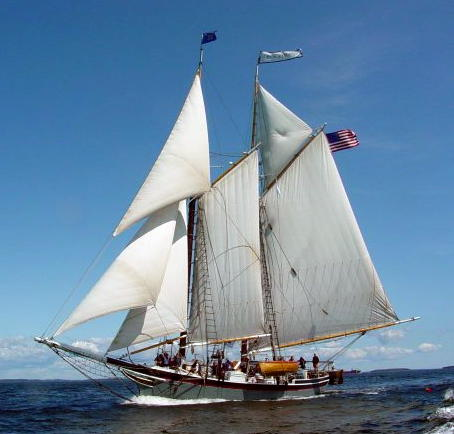

History

United States
- Name: Lewis R. French
- Builder: French Brothers
- Launched: 1871
- Status: In service as of 2023

General characteristics
- Tonnage: 50 gross register tons (GRT)
- Length: 101 ft (31 m) (LOA); 64.7 ft (19.7 m) (LOD); 56.6 ft (17.3 m) (LWL)
- Beam: 18.8 ft (5.7 m)
- Draft: 7.5 ft (2.3 m)
- Depth of hold: 5.4 ft (1.6 m)
- Propulsion: Yawl Boat 85 HP
- Sail plan: Main, Fore, Forestaysail, Jib, Main Gaff Topsail, Jib Topsail
- Complement: 4 crew and 21 Overnight Guests
- Lewis R. French (Schooner)
- U.S. National Register of Historic Places
- U.S. National Historic Landmark
- Location within Maine Location within the United States
- Location: Camden Harbor, Camden, Maine
- Coordinates: 44°12′38″N 69°03′46″W
- Built: 1871
- Architect: French Bros.
- Architectural style: coasting schooner
- NRHP reference No.: 82005263

Significant dates
- Added to NRHP: 4 December 1991
- Designated NHL: 4 December 1992

Lewis R. French is a gaff-rigged topsail schooner sailing out of Camden, Maine as a "Maine windjammer" offering 3 to 6 night cruises to tourists. Built in 1871, she is the oldest known two-masted schooner in the United States, and one of a small number of this once-common form of vessel in active service. The ship was designated a US National Historic Landmark in 1992.

== Description and history ==
Lewis R. French was launched in 1871 in Christmas Cove in the town of South Bristol, Maine. The ship is 101 ft long, has 64.7 feet (19.7 m) of deck, a 18.8-foot (5.7 m) beam, and draws 7.5 feet (2.3 m) with a full keel. Sail is her only means of power. Her frame is of double-sawn oak and hackmatack and her planking is white oak. Fastenings were originally treenails, but were replaced during restoration by spiking.

According to the current owners' website and to researcher and author Virginia L. Thorndike, the schooner was built by the sons of Maine storekeeper Lewis R. French and named for their father. In Thorndike's book Windjammer Watching on the Coast of Maine, the author writes that the three sons had an agreement with their father that he would finance the building of the vessel, and yet he never did. They then retaliated, in a way, by naming the schooner after him, thus forcing the elder Mr. French to honor a maritime tradition which decreed that any living person with a vessel named for them must supply her with a set of flags.

Joseph W. French was her first master. At first used in the coasting trade, she was operated as a fishing vessel between 1877 and 1888 before again returning to coasting. In 1928 her masts were removed and she was converted to engine power, with a pilot house on her quarterdeck. The ship remained in the coasting trade, carrying all manner of cargo, until 1973, when she was purchased by John Foss. He spent three years restoring the vessel to her original sailing condition and outfitting her hold for passengers. Lewis R. French was among the first schooners sailing out of the North End Shipyard, owned by Foss, in Rockland, Maine as part of the "Maine Windjammer Fleet."

In 1986, Foss sold the schooner to his brother-in-law Dan Pease, who sailed and captained the Lewis R. French out of Rockland and then Camden until 2003. That year, she was purchased from Pease by Garth Wells and now sails out of Camden. Garth Wells and his wife Jenny Tobin operated the schooner until April 2022, when they sold the business to Captain Becky Wright and Nathan Sigouin. Wright and Sigouin carry on windjamming with the French still in Camden. Continuously since 1976, she has been in the tourist trade along the Maine coast.

Lewis R. French was listed on the National Register of Historic Places in 1991, and was designated a National Historic Landmark in 1992. She is the oldest two-masted schooner in the United States (slightly older than Stephen Taber, also built in 1871), and is one of only two that has a full keel (the other, the Governor Stone, is also a National Historic Landmark). She is the oldest sailing ship built in Maine, and the only known surviving Maine-built schooner that has always been home-ported in Maine.

== See also ==
- List of National Historic Landmarks in Maine
- National Register of Historic Places listings in Knox County, Maine
- List of schooners
- List of oldest surviving ships
