= List of National Historic Landmarks in Maine =

This is a complete list of National Historic Landmarks in Maine. The United States National Historic Landmark program is operated under the auspices of the National Park Service, and recognizes structures, districts, objects, and similar resources according to a list of criteria of national significance. The state of Maine is home to 44 of these landmarks, displaying the state's maritime heritage, as well as literary, archeological, religious, and a wide array of other themes.

One site in the state, Wickyup, had its landmark designation withdrawn after it was destroyed by fire, and another, the schooner Roseway, was relocated to Boston, Massachusetts. The state is also the location of the National Park Service's only International Historic Site, the St. Croix Island International Historic Site, important in both U.S. and Canadian history as the site of the first French settlement of Acadia in 1603.

== Key ==
	National Historic Landmark
^{†}	National Historic Landmark District
^{#}	National Historic Site, National Historical Park, National Memorial, or National Monument
^{*}	Delisted Landmark

== National Historic landmarks ==
	Landmark name	Image	Date designated	Location	County	Description
1	American Eagle	American Eagle	December 4, 1991 (#91002064)	Rockland; 44°06′41″N 69°06′12″W	Knox	This is one of the last two-masted schooners built in Gloucester, Massachusetts. It is presently used for tourist cruises.
2	James G. Blaine House	James G. Blaine House	January 29, 1964 (#66000024)	Augusta; 44°18′28″N 69°46′53″W	Kennebec	Built in 1833 for a ship's captain, this has been the official residence of the state's governor since 1919.
3	Bowdoin	Bowdoin	December 20, 1989 (#80000411)	Castine; 44°23′12″N 68°47′48″W	Hancock	This schooner was purpose built for Arctic exploration in 1921, and is currently used as a training ship.
4	Camden Amphitheatre and Public Library	Camden Amphitheatre and Public Library	February 27, 2013 (#13000285)	Camden; 44°12′40″N 69°03′52″W	Knox	The Camden Library building was designed in the 1920s by architect Charles F. Loring, and its grounds, including an amphitheatre, represent one of the few public works of landscape architect Fletcher Steele.
5	Parker Cleaveland House	Parker Cleaveland House	May 16, 2000 (#00000702)	Brunswick; 43°54′38″N 69°57′36″W	Cumberland	Home of Parker Cleaveland who conducted some of the earliest studies of mineralogy in the US. Known as the "Father of American Mineralogy", Cleaveland lived in this house from 1806 to 1858.
6	Cushnoc Archeological Site	Cushnoc Archeological Site	April 12, 1993 (#89001703)	Augusta; 44°18′54″N 69°46′16″W	Kennebec	Located near Fort Western, this site encompasses the remains of a 17th-century Plymouth Colony trading post.
7	Neal Dow House	Neal Dow House	May 30, 1974 (#73000236)	Portland; 43°39′11″N 70°16′12″W	Cumberland	Home of Portland mayor and 1880 Prohibition Party candidate for U.S. president Neal S. Dow.
8	Eagle Island	Eagle Island	August 25, 2014 (#71000069)	South of Harpswell on Eagle Island; 43°42′41″N 70°03′23″W	Cumberland	This island was the longtime residence of Arctic explorer Admiral Robert Peary; it is now a state park.
9	Fort Halifax	Fort Halifax	October 18, 1968 (#68000015)	Winslow; 44°32′05″N 69°37′47″W	Kennebec	Part of a 1750s colonial fort, the surviving element is the oldest blockhouse in the United States.
10	Fort Kent	Fort Kent	November 7, 1973 (#69000005)	Fort Kent; 47°15′09″N 68°35′27″W	Aroostook	This is the only surviving fortification of the Aroostook War, the nonviolent confrontation over the border between Maine and New Brunswick.
11	Fort Knox	Fort Knox	December 30, 1970 (#69000023)	Prospect; 44°33′58″N 68°48′09″W	Waldo	Built in the aftermath of the 1830s border disputes, this granite fort, built but not finished between 1844 and 1869, is a fine mid-19th-century fortification.
12	Fort Western	Fort Western	November 7, 1973 (#69000009)	Augusta; 44°18′59″N 69°46′16″W	Kennebec	Built in 1754 in what was then a frontier area, this is the oldest wooden fort in the nation.
13	Daniel Coit Gilman Summer House		December 21, 1965 (#66000093)	Northeast Harbor; 44°17′30″N 68°16′56″W	Hancock	Summer home of Daniel Coit Gilman, president of Johns Hopkins University and a leader in the development of graduate-level education in the United States.
14	Governor's House (Maine)	Governor's House (Maine)	May 30, 1974 (#74000319)	Togus; 44°16′48″N 69°42′08″W	Kennebec	This building from 1869 was part of the first veterans' ("old soldiers") home in the United States.
15	Grace Bailey	Grace Bailey	December 4, 1991 (#90001466)	Camden; 44°12′36″N 69°03′50″W	Knox	This two-masted schooner was built in 1882 for the coasting trade, in which it carried lumber and other supplies for many years. It now serves the tourist trade as a windjammer.
16	Hamilton House	Hamilton House	December 30, 1970 (#70000082)	South Berwick; 43°12′46″N 70°48′56″W	York	This 1788 house was the setting for a novel by local author Sarah Orne Jewett, who was instrumental in its preservation.
17	Harpswell Meetinghouse	Harpswell Meetinghouse	October 18, 1968 (#68000014)	Harpswell Center; 43°47′56″N 69°59′15″W	Cumberland	This building is an outstanding example of a mid-18th century clapboard church. It was also used as a town meeting hall.
18	Winslow Homer Studio	Winslow Homer Studio	December 21, 1965 (#66000092)	Scarborough; 43°31′42″N 70°19′13″W	Cumberland	This remodeled carriage house served as the studio of artist Winslow Homer from 1884 until is death. It is now a property of the Portland Museum of Art, which seasonally offers tours.
19	Isaac H. Evans	Isaac H. Evans	December 4, 1991 (#91002061)	Rockland; 44°06′32″N 69°06′32″W	Knox	This 1886 schooner was built to serve as an oyster ship. It is now part of the Maine windjammer tourist fleet.
20	J. & E. Riggin	J. & E. Riggin	December 4, 1991 (#91002062)	Rockland; 44°06′26″N 69°06′23″W	Knox	This 1920s schooner is one of the last generation of oyster schooners. Eventually motorized, it was converted back to sailing, and is now a Maine windjammer.
21	Sarah Orne Jewett House	Sarah Orne Jewett House	July 17, 1991 (#73000248)	South Berwick; 43°14′05″N 70°48′13″W	York	This 1774 house was the longtime home of author Sarah Orne Jewett. Active in historical conservation, her heirs gave the house to the Society for the Preservation of New England Antiquities, now known as Historic New England.
22^{†}	Kennebec Arsenal	Kennebec Arsenal	February 16, 2000 (#70000046)	Augusta; 44°18′30″N 69°46′10″W	Kennebec	A munitions depot that built in the 1830s during border tensions, this is the finest surviving example of a military installation from that time.
23	Lady Pepperrell House	Lady Pepperrell House	October 9, 1960 (#66000094)	Kittery Point; 43°04′53″N 70°43′00″W	York	This magnificent High Georgian mansion was built in the early 1760s by the widow of Sir William Pepperrell, a leading businessman and politician of the era.
24	Lewis R. French	Lewis R. French	December 4, 1991 (#82005263)	Camden Harbor, Camden; 44°12′37″N 69°03′46″W	Knox	This 1871 schooner is the oldest known schooner built in Maine. Used mostly in the coasting cargo trade, it now serves the tourist trade as a windjammer.
25	McIntire Garrison House	McIntire Garrison House	October 18, 1968 (#68000017)	York; 43°10′05″N 70°42′49″W	York	This house, built in the late 17th or early 18th century, is a fine example of vernacular log architecture of the period.
26	McLellan-Sweat Mansion	McLellan-Sweat Mansion	December 30, 1970 (#70000073)	Portland; 43°39′12″N 70°15′45″W	Cumberland	Built in 1800 for a shipping merchant, this mansion has been a part of the Portland Museum of Art for many years.
27	Mercantile	Mercantile	December 4, 1991 (#82005265)	Camden; 44°12′36″N 69°03′46″W	Knox	This 1916 schooner was used in the coast trade until the 1940s. It has been restored and is now part of the Maine windjammer fleet.
28	Morse-Libby Mansion	Morse-Libby Mansion	December 30, 1970 (#70000074)	Portland; 43°39′05″N 70°15′39″W	Cumberland	This mansion, built in 1860 for a hotelier as a summer house, is recognized as one of the finest and least-altered examples of a large Italianate Villa-styled brick and brownstone town house in the United States. It is known locally as the Victoria Mansion.
29	Nickels-Sortwell House	Nickels-Sortwell House	December 30, 1970 (#70000078)	Wiscasset; 44°00′10″N 69°39′56″W	Lincoln	Originally built for a ship's captain in 1807, this house saw multiple uses before being purchased for use as a summer residence. It is now a house museum operated by Historic New England.
30^{†}	Norridgewock Archeological District	Norridgewock Archeological District	April 12, 1993 (#93000606)	Madison; 44°45′54″N 69°52′59″W	Somerset	This archaeological district encompasses the village of the Norridgewock Abenaki, central Maine's native inhabitants. They were pushed out of the area in a series of conflicts with colonists in the first half of the 18th century.
31	Old York Gaol	Old York Gaol	October 18, 1968 (#68000016)	York; 43°08′38″N 70°39′06″W	York	This building was used as a jail from 1719 to 1879, and was built using architectural elements of an even older jail. It saw other uses afterward, and is now a local museum.
32	Olson House	Olson House	June 23, 2011 (#93001114)	Cushing; 43°58′54″N 69°16′07″W	Knox	Andrew Wyeth spent 30 summers at the house and is buried on the grounds. The house is depicted in many of his paintings including Christina's World.
33^{†}	Pemaquid Archeological Site	Pemaquid Archeological Site	April 12, 1993 (#69000022)	Bristol; 43°52′41″N 69°31′17″W	Lincoln	This site, located on the central coast of Maine, encompasses fortifications and colonial communities dating back before King William's War in the 1690s.
34^{†}	Pentagoet Archeological District	Pentagoet Archeological District	April 12, 1993 (#93000603)	Castine; 44°23′04″N 68°48′12″W	Hancock	This archaeological site covers extended colonial history dating to the early 17th century. In addition to trade with the native inhabitants, it was also the site of intercolonial (French-English and French-French) conflict until the mid-18th century.
35	Perkins Homestead	Perkins Homestead	August 25, 2014 (#14000919)	Newcastle; 44°00′19″N 69°33′27″W	Lincoln	The family homestead and lifelong summer residence of influential Secretary of Labor Frances Perkins.
36	Portland Observatory	Portland Observatory	February 17, 2006 (#73000122)	Portland; 43°39′55″N 70°14′54″W	Cumberland	This 1807 wooden tower is the oldest maritime signal tower in the United States; it was capable of sending and receiving signals to and from ships entering Portland Harbor.
37	Thomas B. Reed House	Thomas B. Reed House	May 15, 1975 (#73000239)	Portland; 43°39′15″N 70°16′03″W	Cumberland	This house was built in 1888 as the home of Thomas Brackett Reed (1839–1902), Speaker of the House of Representatives (1889–1891 and 1895–1899).
38	Edwin Arlington Robinson House	Edwin Arlington Robinson House	November 11, 1971 (#71000070)	Gardiner; 44°13′20″N 69°46′25″W	Kennebec	Home of Pulitzer Prize-winning poet Edwin Arlington Robinson.
39^{†}	Sabbathday Lake Shaker Village	Sabbathday Lake Shaker Village	May 30, 1974 (#74000318)	New Gloucester; 43°59′22″N 70°21′59″W	Cumberland	Founded in 1783, organized in 1794, this is the last active Shaker community in the United States. A representative collection of Shaker implements and furniture is housed in the buildings.
40	Stephen Taber	Stephen Taber	December 4, 1991 (#84001386)	Rockland; 44°06′20″N 69°06′25″W	Knox	A two-masted schooner currently operated as a windjammer, this 1871 ship is the oldest of its type with a documented history of continuous service.
41	Harriet Beecher Stowe House	Harriet Beecher Stowe House	December 29, 1962 (#66000091)	Brunswick; 43°54′46″N 69°57′39″W	Cumberland	This house was home to abolitionist writer Harriet Beecher Stowe, where she wrote Uncle Tom's Cabin.
42	Tate House	Tate House	November 11, 1971 (#70000072)	Stroudwater; 43°39′27″N 70°18′45″W	Cumberland	This 1750s house was built for George Tate, a British Royal Navy agent in charge of procuring ship masts. It is the only pre-Revolutionary house in the Portland area that is open to the public.
43	Victory Chimes	Victory Chimes	September 25, 1997 (#93000637)	Rockland; 44°06′41″N 69°06′14″W	Knox	A cargo schooner built in Delaware in 1900, this ship now serves as part of Maine's windjammer fleet. The ship on Maine's State Quarter resembles her.
44	Wadsworth-Longfellow House	Wadsworth-Longfellow House	December 29, 1962 (#66000090)	Portland; 43°39′25″N 70°15′37″W	Cumberland	Home of Revolutionary War General Peleg Wadsworth, it was the childhood home of his grandson, poet Henry Wadsworth Longfellow.

== Listings formerly in Maine ==
#	Landmark name	Image	Date designated	Date withdrawn/moved	Locality	County	Description
1	Wickyup (Richard E. Byrd House)	Photograph of Wickyup, showing one of the cobble chimneys and the log construction.	August 24, 1970	March 5, 1986	East Sullivan	Hancock	This house was the summer home of pioneer aviator and explorer Admiral Richard E. Byrd from 1937 until his death in 1957. Here he planned three Antarctic expeditions, wrote, and drafted what became the 1959 Antarctic Treaty. Wickyup was destroyed by fire in 1984.
2	Roseway		September 25, 1997	2014	Camden; 44.21°N 69.06278°W	Knox	Launched on November 24, 1925 in Essex, Massachusetts, this wooden gaff-rigged schooner was used primarily for competitive racing. She is now located in Boston, Massachusetts.

== See also ==
- National Register of Historic Places listings in Maine
- List of National Historic Landmarks by state
- Historic preservation
- National Register of Historic Places
- History of Maine
- List of National Natural Landmarks in Maine
