= Isaac H. Evans =

US two-masted schooner

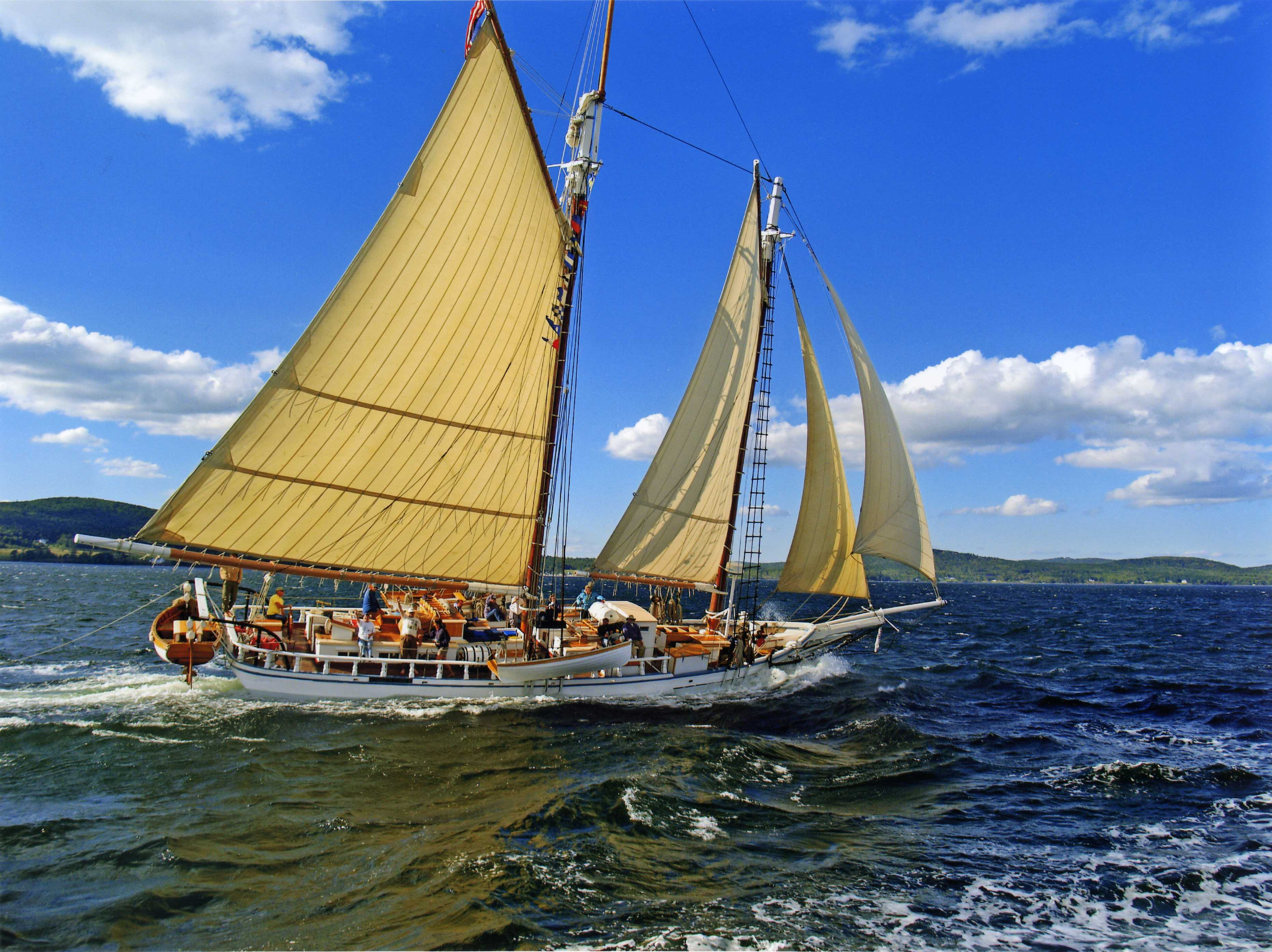

History
- Name: Isaac H. Evans

General characteristics
- Length: 99 ft (30 m) LOA
- Beam: 20 ft (6.1 m)
- Draft: 6 ft (1.8 m) (centerboard up
- Sail plan: Gaff-rigged topsail schooner
- Isaac H. Evans (Schooner)
- U.S. National Register of Historic Places
- U.S. National Historic Landmark
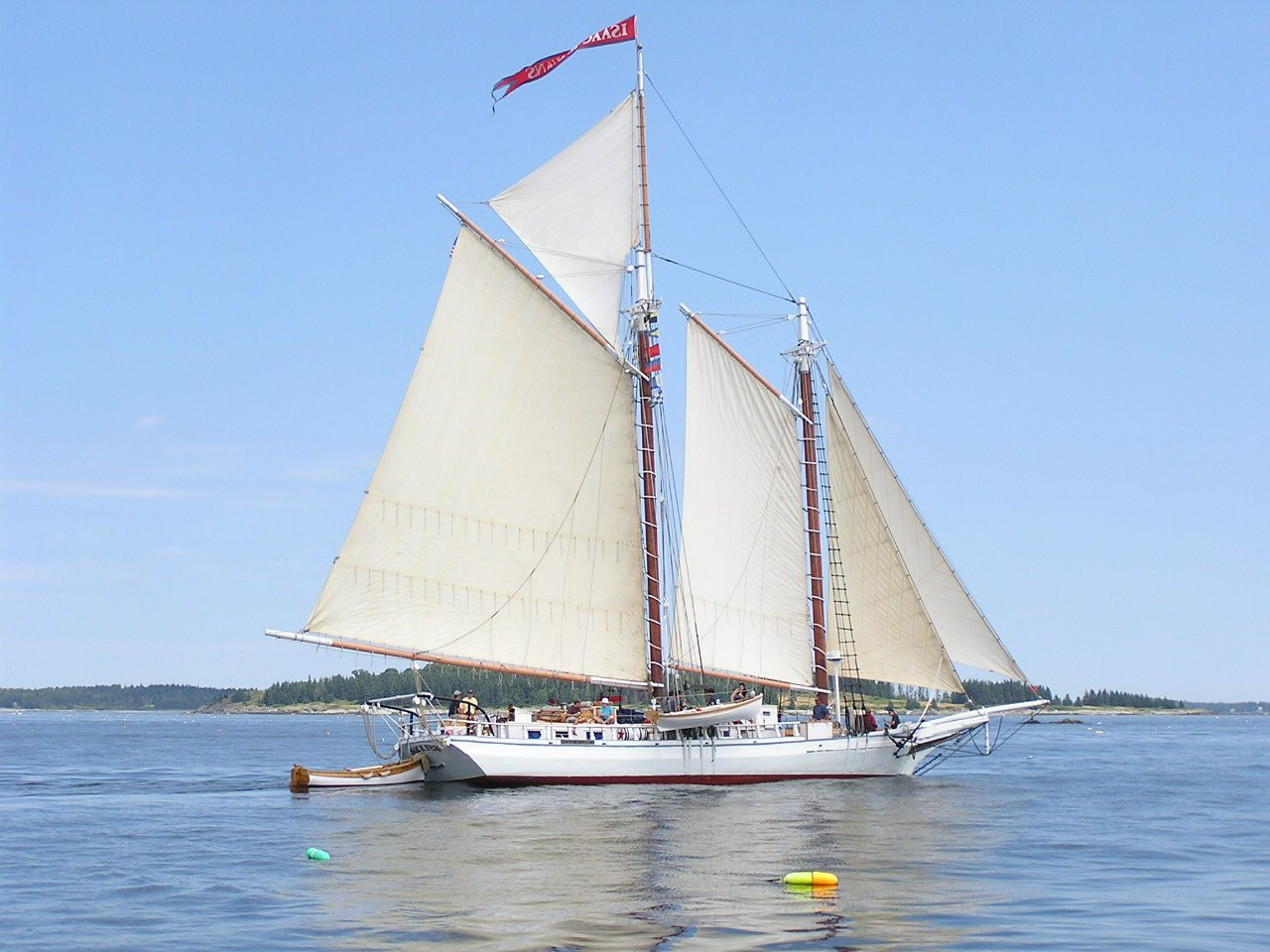

- Location within Maine Location within the United States
- Location: Rockland Harbor, Rockland, Maine
- Coordinates: 44°6′32″N 69°6′32″W
- Built: 1886
- Architect: Vannaman, J.W.,& Brother
- NRHP reference No.: 91002061

Significant dates
- Added to NRHP: 4 December 1991
- Designated NHL: 4 December 1992

Isaac H. Evans, originally Boyd N. Sheppard, is a two-masted schooner berthed in Rockland, Maine. She is a Maine windjammer, serving the tourist trade. Built in 1886 in Mauricetown, New Jersey, she is the oldest of a small number of surviving oyster schooners, used in service of the oyster harvesting industry in the coastal waters of New Jersey. She was declared a National Historic Landmark in 1992.

== Description and history ==
Isaac H. Evans has a sparred length of 99 feet (30 m), 65 feet (20 m) on deck, 20 feet (6.1 m) at the beam and draws 6 feet (1.8 m) with the centerboard up, and 13 feet (4.0 m) with the centerboard down. She is a two-masted gaff-rigged topsail schooner with low sides and an elegant clipper bow, using a yawl boat for auxiliary power as one might a small tug boat to maneuver the vessel on and off the dock and when she is becalmed. Her framing is double-sawn oak, originally fastened with treenails but now spikes, and has oak planking. Her complement of sails includes a mainsail, maintopsail, foresail, staysail, and jib. The hold, although it has been fitted for passenger occupancy, has retained its original joinery.

The ship was laid down in 1886 at the shipyard of J. W. Vannaman and Brother in Mauricetown, New Jersey. She was originally named Boyd N. Sheppard, and was first owned by a consortium that included Harrison and Frank Sheppard, eventually becoming the sole property of Harrison Sheppard. She was based in Mauricetown, and Sheppard worked the oyster beds of Delaware Bay, using her to ship his product to New York City. In 1909 he sold her to the three sons of Isaac H. Evans, who renamed her after their father in 1919. She continued to work in the oyster trade under sail until 1946, when her masts were removed and a motor installed. Use of this type of ship in the oystering industry declined in the years after World War II, with many of the existing schooners either scrapped or laid up and left to rot. Isaac H. Evans was purchased by a couple from Rockland, Maine in 1971, the first in a series of "new" vessels to join the existing Maine windjammer fleet established around 1940. She spent two years being restored, which included returning her to her original sailing configuration. In late September 1984, during early morning hours, the ship was hit by a squall during a windjammer cruise in Penobscot Bay near Little Deer Island. The ship listed badly and capsized within minutes leaving all 23 on board in need of rescue. Fortunately all survived the event, and the ship was raised shortly thereafter.

== Present ==
Isaac H. Evans is part of the Maine Windjammer fleet and member of the Maine Windjammer Association, carrying 22 adventure vacationers and ecotourists on 1-, 2-, 3-, 4- and 6-night sailing trips in Penobscot Bay, Maine. Her homeport is Rockland, Maine and her sailing grounds range from Boothbay Harbor, Maine to Bar Harbor, Maine.

As of June 2026, Isaac H. Evans is out of service and anchored at Boothbay Harbor, Maine.

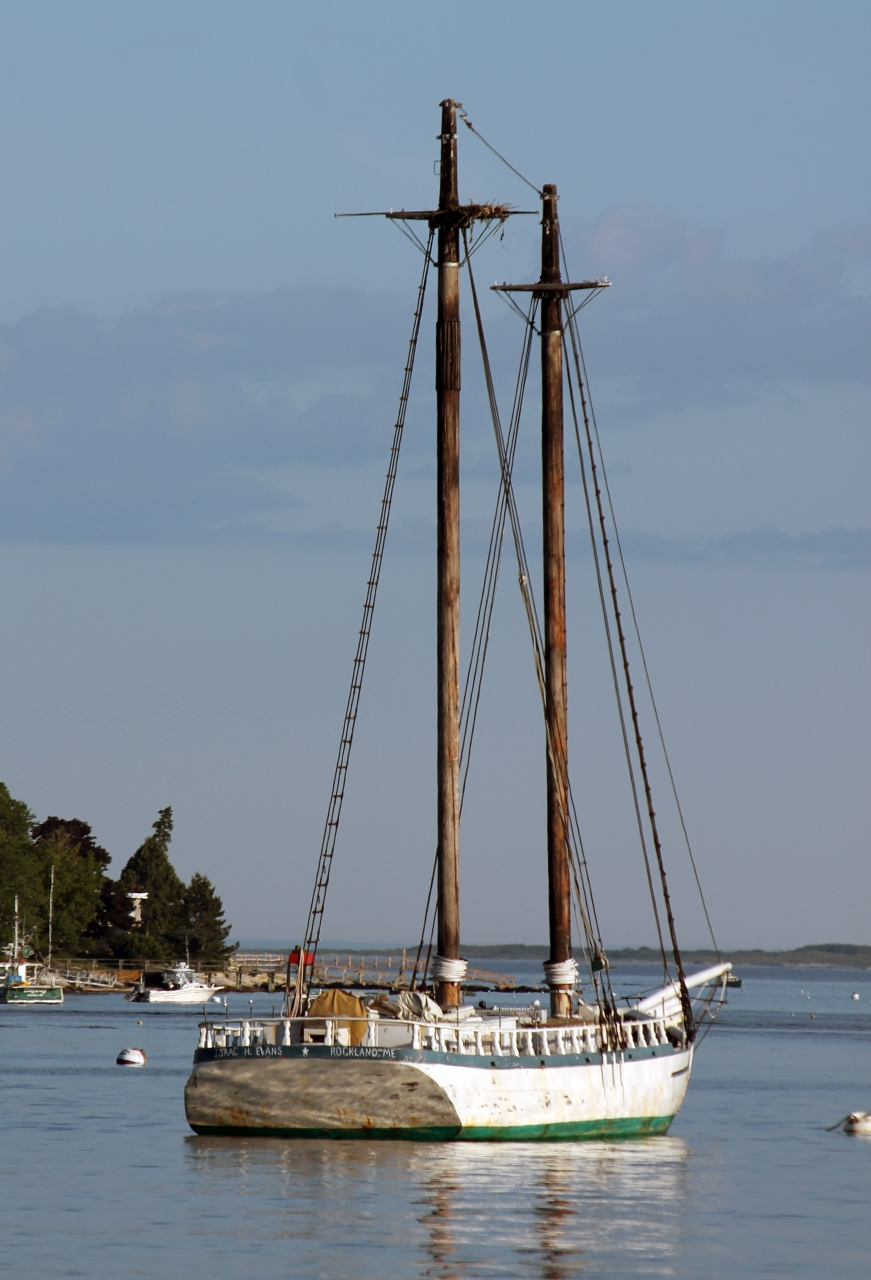
Schooner Isaac H Evans at anchor, Boothbay Harbor, Maine, June 2026

== See also ==
- List of schooners
- List of National Historic Landmarks in Maine
- National Register of Historic Places listings in Knox County, Maine
