= Mercantile (schooner) =

1914–1916 Schooner built in Maine

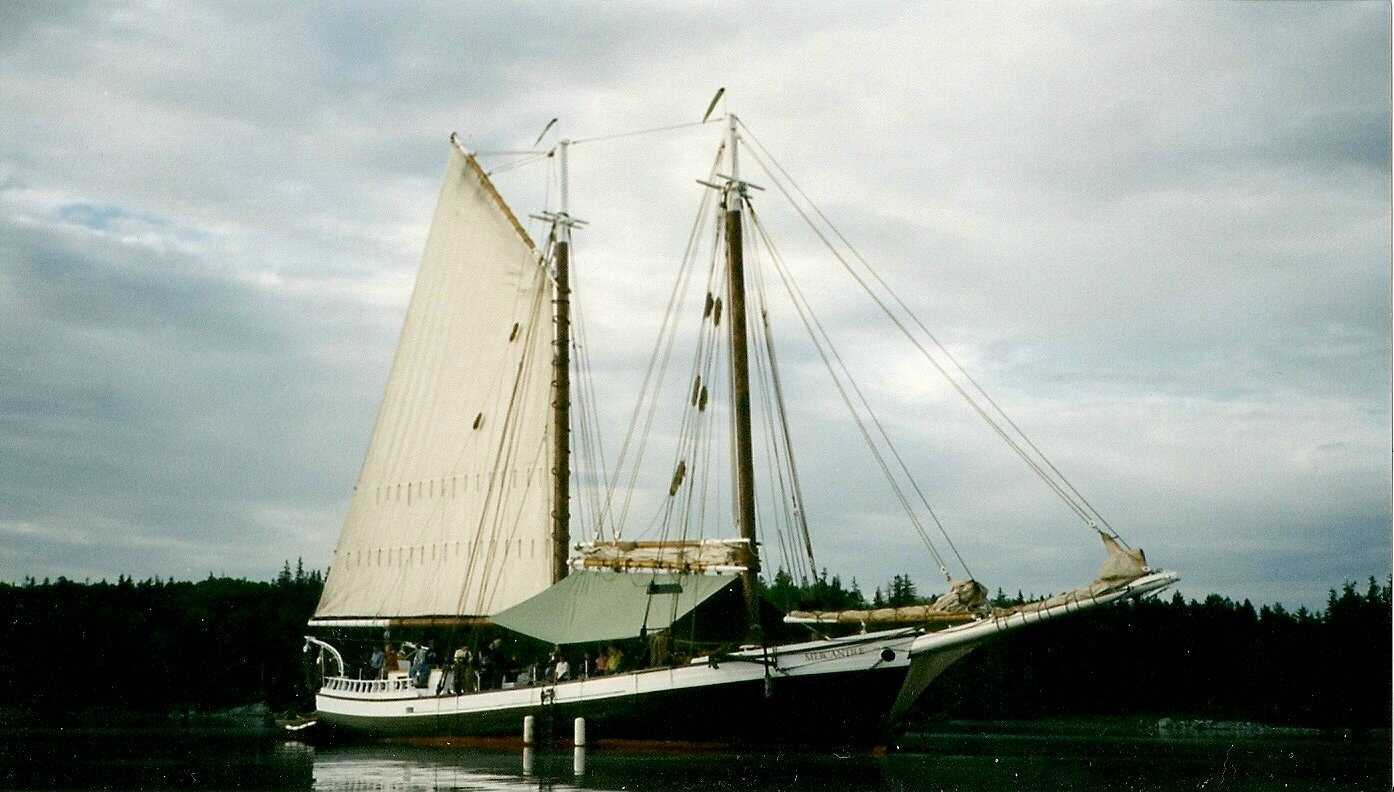

History
- Name: Mercantile
- Builder: Billings Family
- Launched: 1916

General characteristics
- Length: 155 ft (47 m) LOA, 80 ft (24 m) on deck
- Draft: 10 ft 7 in (3.23 m); 5 ft (1.5 m) (centerboard up)
- Propulsion: Sail, auxiliary engine
- Sail plan: gaff-rigged two-masted schooner
- Notes: shoal draft centerboard
- Mercantile
- U.S. National Register of Historic Places
- U.S. National Historic Landmark
- Location within Maine
- Location: Camden Harbor, Camden, Maine
- Coordinates: 44°12′36.10″N 69°3′45.87″W
- Built: 1916
- Architect: Billings Family
- NRHP reference No.: 82005265 & 90001470

Significant dates
- Added to NRHP: 4 December 1991
- Designated NHL: 4 December 1991

Mercantile is a two-masted schooner berthed in Camden Harbor, Camden, Maine. Built in the 1914–16 on Little Deer Isle, Maine, she is one of a small number of such vessels still afloat from a time when they were one of the most common cargo vessels of the coasting trade. Designated a National Historic Landmark in 1991, she now serves as a "Maine windjammer", offering multi-day sailing cruises to tourists.

== Description and history ==
Mercantile is a total of 115 feet (35 m) long, with a deck 80 feet (24 m) and 22 feet (6.7 m) wide. Her normal sailing rig consists of a mainsail, foresail, two headsails, and no topsails. She is framed and planked out of white oak, and has a pine deck. Her woodwork was originally fastened by treenails, but when restored these were changed to galvanized spikes.

Mercantile was built on Little Deer Isle, Maine by members of the Billings family over three seasons, and was launched in 1916. From then until 1943 the Billingses operated her in the coasting trade as one of thousands of such vessels built. In 1943 she was briefly involved in the mackerel fisheries of southern New England, before she was sold to Frank Swift and adapted for use as a tourist vessel. In the 1930s Swift conceived of the idea of using these vessels, which were generally laid up in coves and harbors and left to rot, to carry paying customers on sailing cruises, and this was one of the early vessels he used for this purpose. Although she has undergone several ownership changes, she has always operated in the tourist trade out of Camden Harbor. Her most recent major restoration was in 1989.

== See also ==
- List of schooners
- List of National Historic Landmarks in Maine
- National Register of Historic Places listings in Knox County, Maine
