= Crystal Bog =

Coordinates: 46°02′04″N 68°19′49″W

Crystal Bog is a domed bog in the town of Crystal in Aroostook County, Maine. It "supports one of Maine’s most diverse fens and a large number of rare plants and animals". It was declared one of Maine's National Natural Landmarks in 1973.
