= Stephen Taber (schooner) =

Ship built in 1871

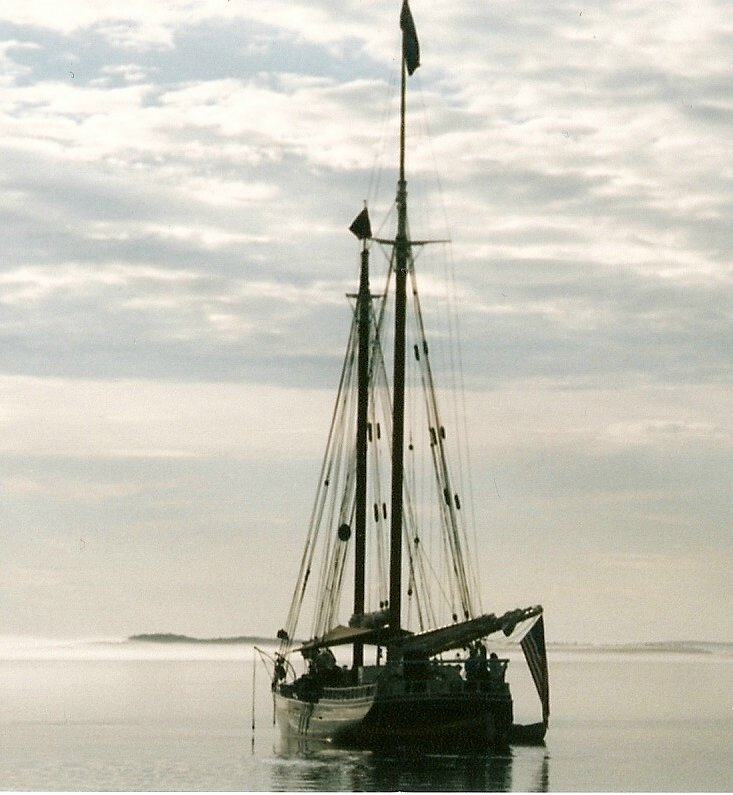

History
- Name: Stephen Taber
- Launched: 1871

General characteristics
- Tonnage: 47 (gross); 44 (net)
- Length: 115 ft (35 m) LOA; 68 ft (21 m) Deck
- Beam: 22 ft 5 in (6.83 m)
- Draft: 14 ft 6 in (4.42 m); 5 ft (1.5 m) (centerboard up)
- Sail plan: Schooner
- Stephen Taber
- U.S. National Register of Historic Places
- U.S. National Historic Landmark
- Location within Maine Location within the United States
- Location: Rockland, Maine
- Coordinates: 44°06′20″N 69°06′25″W
- Built: 1871
- Architect: VanCott, A.W., Shipyard; Bedel Shipyard
- NRHP reference No.: 84001386

Significant dates
- Added to NRHP: 30 July 1984
- Designated NHL: 4 December 1992

Stephen Taber is a two-masted schooner, built in 1871, operating as a "windjammer" in the tourist trade out of Rockland, Maine. A National Historic Landmark, she is one of a small number of surviving schooners originally built for the Atlantic coasting trade, and one of only three with a centerboard, allowing access through shallow channels and to shallow landing points. She is named for New York lawyer and politician Stephen Taber, and has a well-documented history of continuous service since her construction.

== Description and history ==
Stephen Taber is a wooden schooner, with a deck length of 68 feet (21 m), an overall length of 115 feet (35 m), and a maximum width of 22 feet 5 inches (6.83 m). She has a draft of 5 feet (1.5 m) when the centerboard is up, and 14 feet 6 inches (4.42 m) when it is down. She is normally operated by a crew of five, and is rigged according to a historical 1883 photograph with a mainsail, foresail, and two headsails. Her framing and planking are oak, and were originally fastened with treenails, which were replaced during restorative work with galvanized spikes. She has a low deckhouse aft, and her hold is presently configured for passenger accommodations. Her main deck, which is not original, is pine.

Stephen Taber was launched in October 1871 at Bedel Shipyard in Glenwood Landing, New York, on the south coast of Long Island Sound. Her owners were the Cox brothers, and she was named for Stephen Taber, a lawyer and politician living in Roslyn, New York. Until about 1920 she worked primarily in the area around New York Harbor, although she was briefly adapted for carrying passengers in 1900 and 1902 when the coasting business was slow. In 1920 she was sold to a captain in Maine, and operated in and around Penobscot Bay. In 1946 she was sold to Captain Boyd Guild, who adapted her for the "windjammer" tourist trade, a role she has served since, now based in Rockland, Maine. She has been in continuous service except for periods of restoration, including in 1900, 1930, and 1981–83.

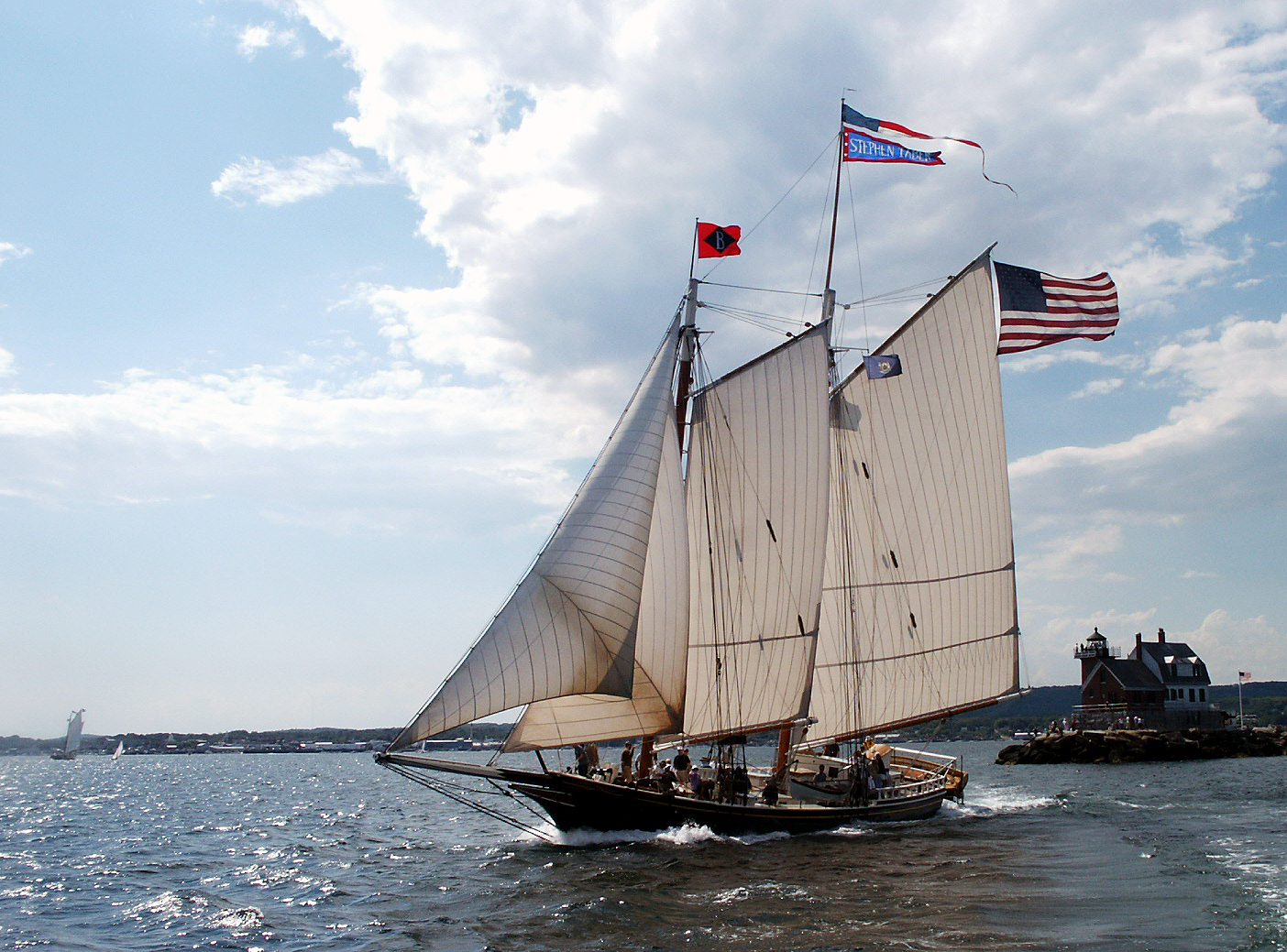
Stephen Taber and the Rockland Breakwater

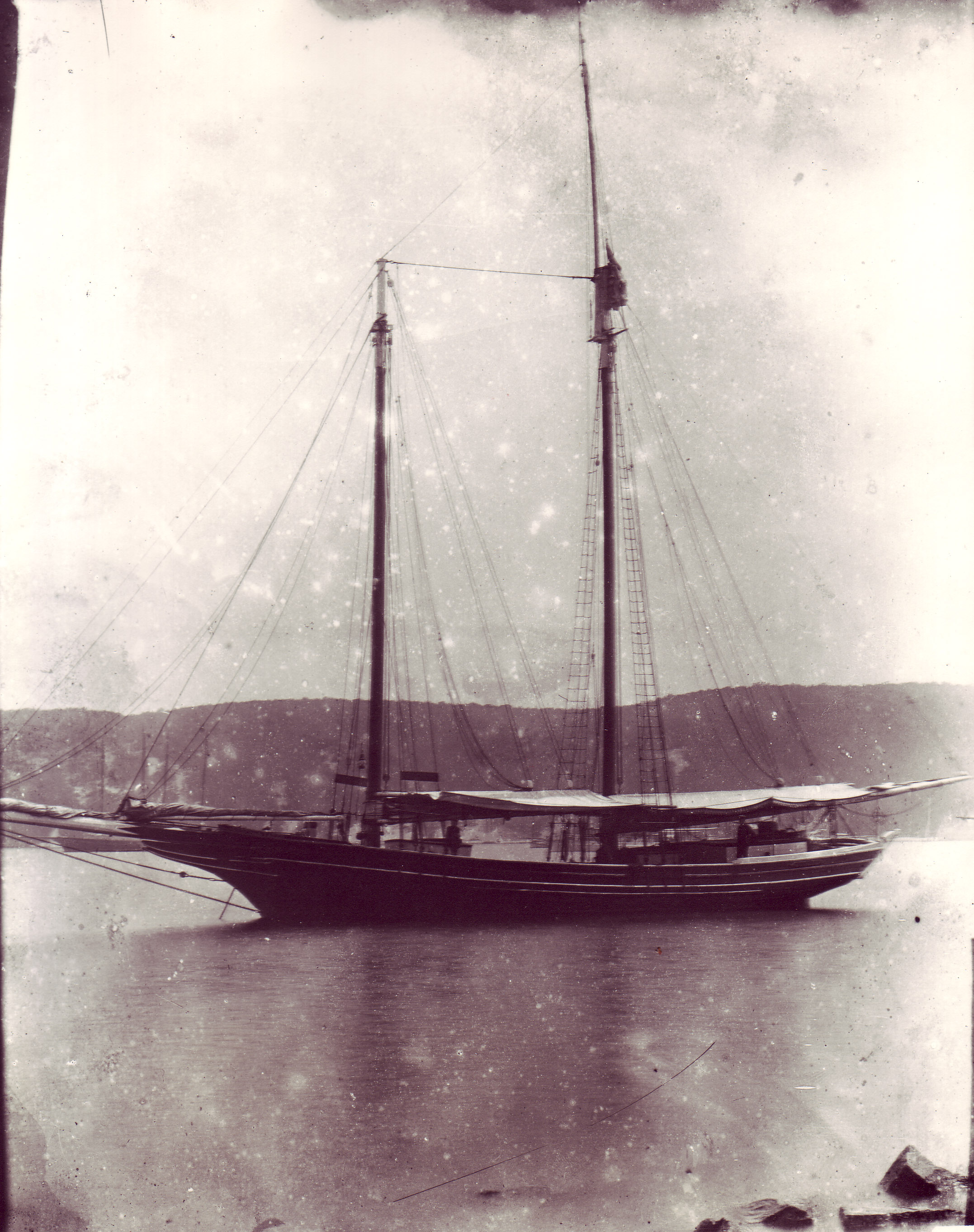
Stephen Taber anchored off Long Island c. 1900

== See also ==
- List of schooners
- List of National Historic Landmarks in Maine
- National Register of Historic Places listings in Knox County, Maine
