= Grace Bailey (schooner) =

Ship

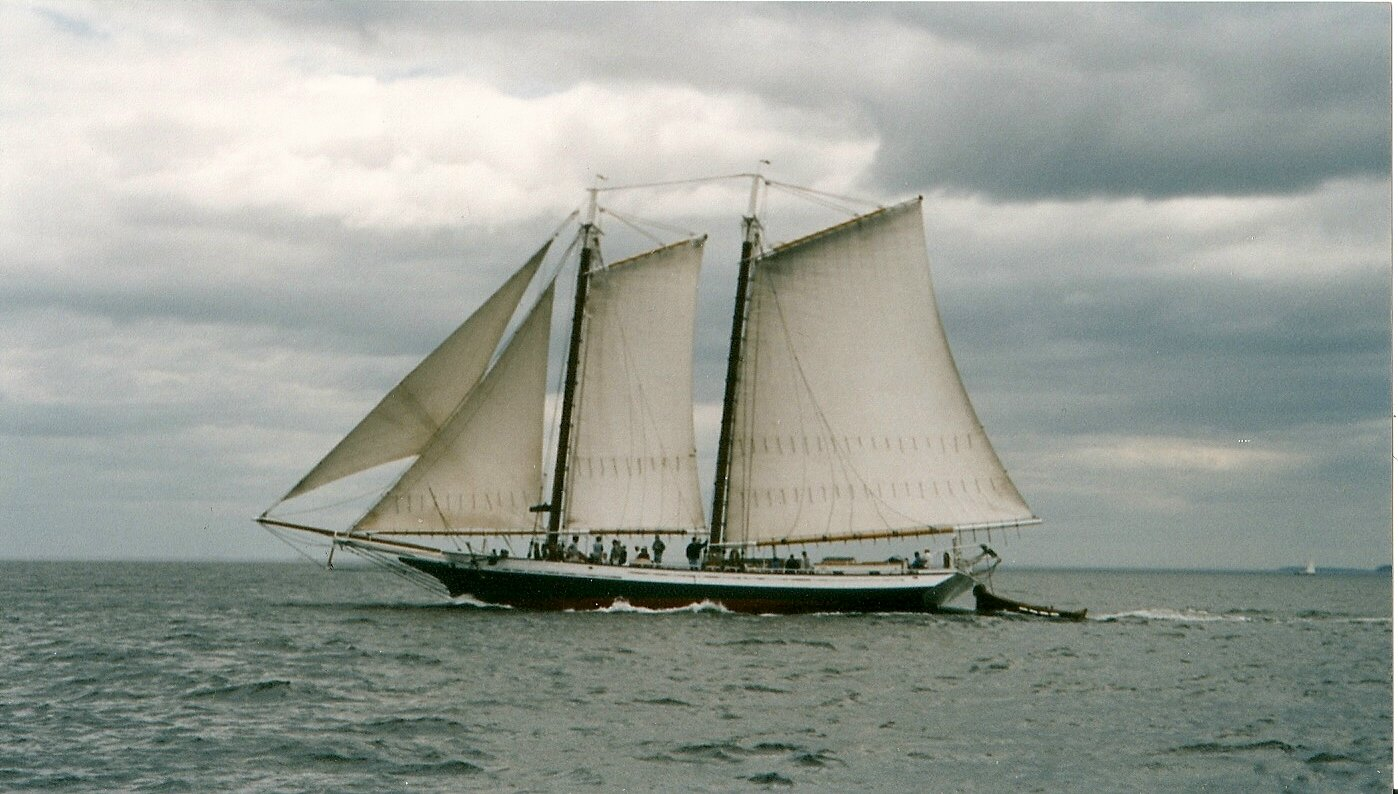

History
- Name: Grace Bailey
- Launched: 1882

General characteristics
- Tonnage: 58 (gross)
- Length: 118 ft (36 m) LOA
- Beam: 23 ft 5 in (7.14 m) breadth
- Grace Bailey
- U.S. National Register of Historic Places
- U.S. National Historic Landmark
- Location within Maine Location within the United States
- Location: Camden, Maine
- Coordinates: 44°12′36″N 69°3′50″W
- Architect: Oliver Perry Smith
- NRHP reference No.: 90001466

Significant dates
- Added to NRHP: 1 October 1990
- Designated NHL: 4 December 1992

Grace Bailey, also known for many years as Mattie, is a two-masted schooner whose home port is Camden Harbor, Camden, Maine. Built in 1882 in Patchogue, New York, she is one of four surviving two-masted wooden-hulled schooners, once the most common vessel in the American coasting trade. She was one of the first ships in the fleet of historic vessels known as "Maine windjammers", which offer cruises in Penobscot Bay and the Maine coast, entering that service in 1939. She last underwent major restoration in 1989–90. She was declared a National Historic Landmark in 1992.

== Description and history ==
Grace Bailey is a two-master schooner with an 80-foot (24 m) deck and an overall length of 118 feet (36 m). Her rigging consists of a mainsail, foresail, and two headsails. She has no engines, normally sailing with a small boat that is powered by an internal diesel engine. Her wooden hull is framed and planked in oak, with pine decking. When built, it was originally fastened with wooden treenails, but these were replaced by galvanized ship spikes during restoration. Below decks she is now outfitted with cabins for carrying passengers and crew.

Grace Bailey was built in 1882 in Patchogue, New York by Gilbert Smith for owner Edwin Bailey, who named her after his daughter who was born in that year. She was rebuilt in 1906, at which time she was renamed Mattie, a name she sailed under until her restoration in 1989–90. She served in the coasting trade until 1939, the last twenty of those years on the Maine coastline. Relatively small ships like this were the workhorse of the coasting fleet, carrying goods and supplies to areas where road access at the time was difficult or impossible.

In 1939 she was chartered by Frank Swift, who had just two years earlier seized on the idea of using schooners for passenger excursions, since they had become financially unviable in the coasting freight trade. Meeting with financial success, he purchased her outright the following year. She has since then served in the "windjammer" fleet, providing sailing cruises to paying customers.

On October 9, 2023, her main mast snapped while under sail just outside the breakwater in Rockland, Maine. One passenger was killed and five others were injured. The US Coast Guard released a report of its investigation into the incident in July of 2025, blaming rotted wood and poor inspections.

== See also ==
- List of schooners
- List of National Historic Landmarks in Maine
- National Register of Historic Places listings in Knox County, Maine
