= J. & E. Riggin (schooner) =

Schooner

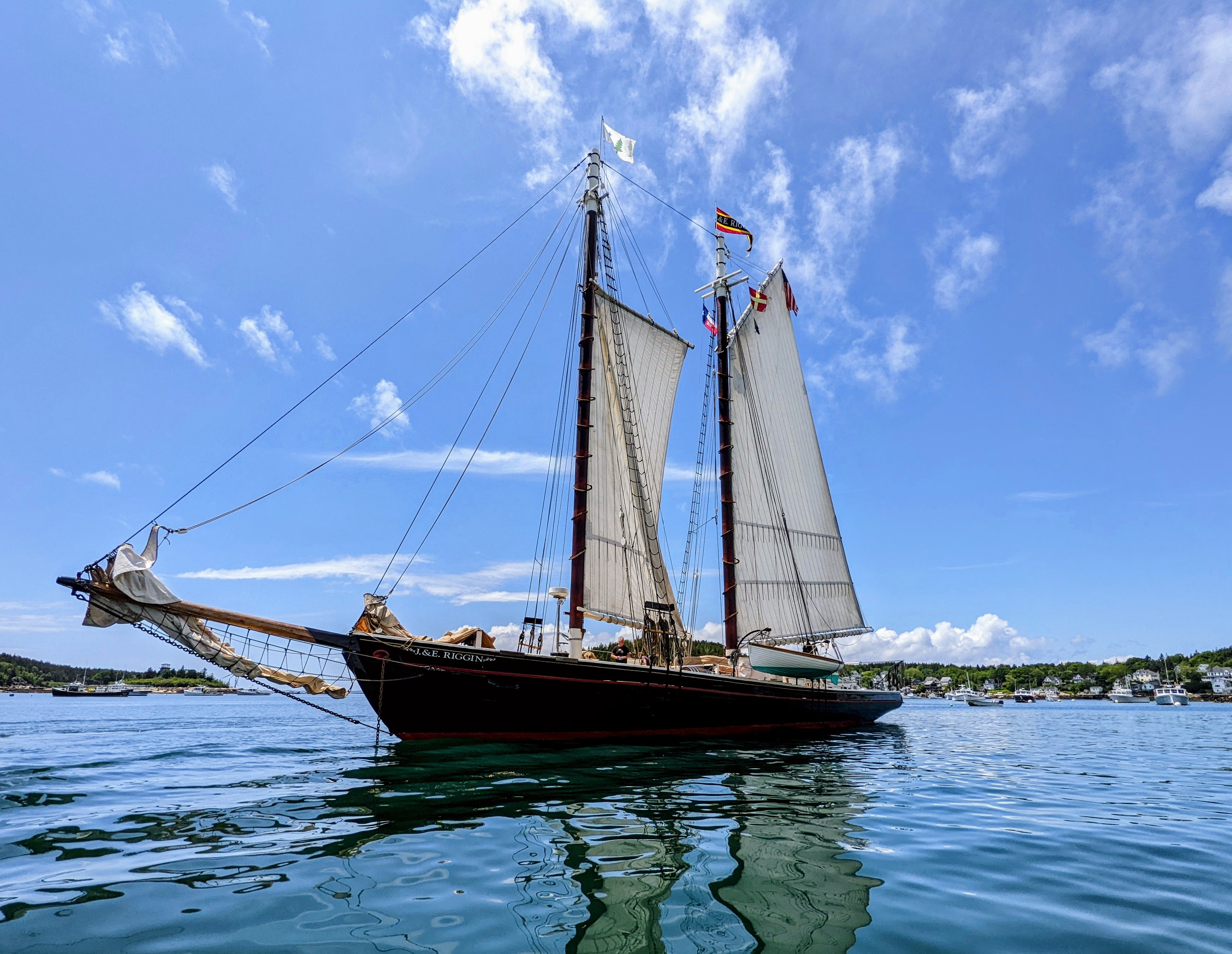
- J. & E. Riggin image from June 23, 2022 during a sailing tour in Maine.

History
- Launched: 1927

General characteristics
- Length: 120 ft (37 m) LOA
- Beam: 23 ft (7.0 m)
- Draft: 7 ft (2.1 m) (centerboard up)
- J. & E. Riggin (Schooner)
- U.S. National Register of Historic Places
- U.S. National Historic Landmark
- Location within Maine Location within the United States
- Location: Rockland Harbor, Rockland, Maine
- Coordinates: 44°6′26″N 69°6′23″W
- Built: 1927
- Architect: Stowaman's Shipyard
- NRHP reference No.: 91002062

Significant dates
- Added to NRHP: 4 December 1991
- Designated NHL: 4 December 1992

The schooner J. & E. Riggin, a National Historic Landmark, was built on the Maurice River in Dorchester, New Jersey in 1927. She is one of a small number of surviving two-masted schooners, once one of the most common sailing ships in North American waters. Now based in Rockland, Maine, she serves as a "windjammer" offering sailing cruises to tourists.

== History ==
Charles Riggin had her built for his dredging oyster schooner fleet and named her after his sons, Jacob and Edward. They all captained her at one time or another on the Delaware Bay. She was always known as a quick, light air vessel and her speed was proven in 1929 when she handily won the only official Oyster Dredging Race in the Delaware Bay. She was used for oyster-dredging until the 1940s, when the fishing regulations changed. The Riggin family sold her and she was converted to power to begin fishing for groundfish and mackerel in Cape Cod and Long Island Sound.

In the early 1970s she was bought by Dave and Sue Allen and converted from a fishing vessel to a passenger carrying vessel which is what she remains. Her engine was removed and cabins added below to create space for guests. She is part of the Maine Windjammer fleet, carrying vacationers on 3-, 4- and 6-day sailing trips in Penobscot Bay, Maine. Her homeport is Rockland, Maine and her sailing grounds range from Boothbay Harbor, Maine to Bar Harbor, Maine. Much of her deck, underwater planking and frames are original.

J. & E. Riggin was declared a National Historic Landmark in 1992.

== Description ==
J. & E. Riggin's sparred length is 120 feet (37 m), 89 feet (27 m) on deck, 23 feet (7.0 m) at the beam and draws 7 feet (2.1 m) with the centerboard up. She is a bald-headed schooner with low sides and a spoon bow, using a yawl boat for auxiliary power as one might a small tug boat to maneuver the vessel on and off the dock and when she is becalmed.

== See also ==
- List of schooners
- List of National Historic Landmarks in Maine
- National Register of Historic Places in Knox County, Maine
