= Treenail =

Wooden fastener

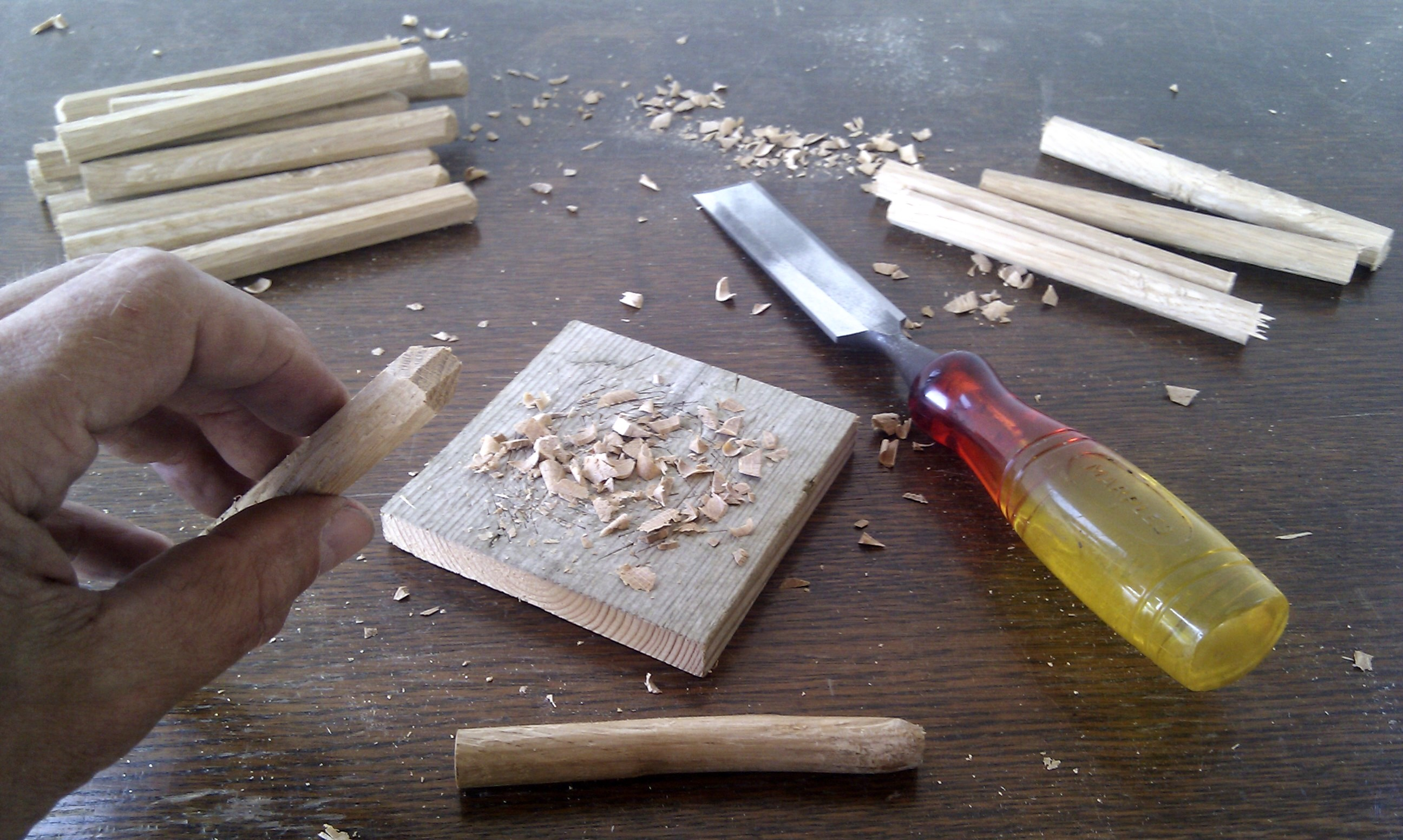
Oak treenails for pinning a wooden structure together. A used one (front center) demonstrates permanent deformation from the forces that bore on it

A treenail, also trenail, trennel, or trunnel, is a wooden peg, pin, or dowel used to fasten pieces of wood together, especially in timber frames, covered bridges, wooden ship- and boat-building. It is driven into a hole bored through two (or more) pieces of structural wood (mortise and tenon).

== History and general use ==
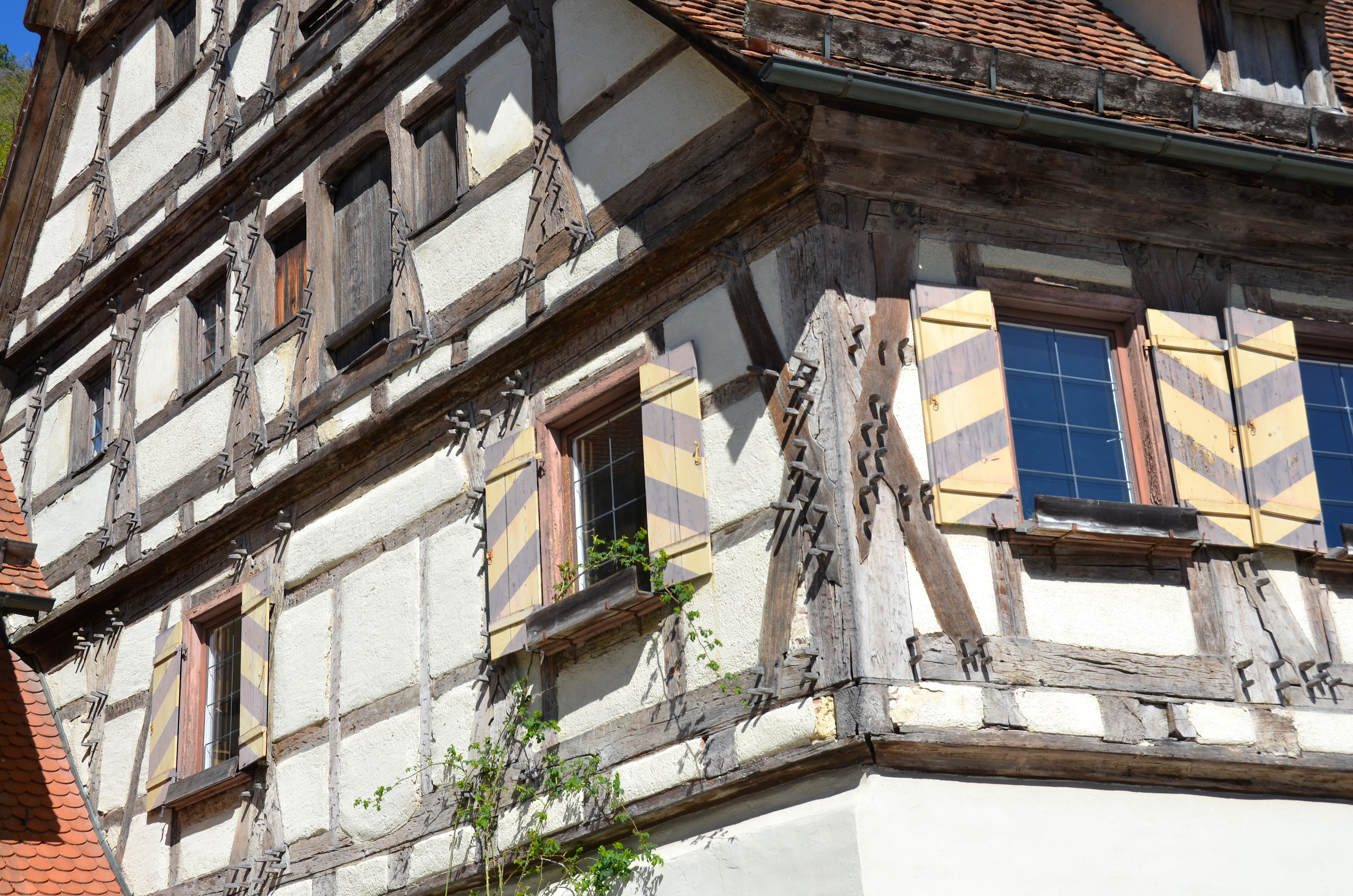
Protruding treenails used in timber framing at Blaubeuren Abbey, Germany. c.1478

Treenails are extremely economical and readily available, making them a common fastener in early wooden construction, with use of wood as a tenon traced back over 7,000 years.

Due to their strength and rot resistance, black locust is a favorite treenail material in North American shipbuilding and English oak in European, while red oak is typically found in buildings. Traditionally treenails and pegs were made by splitting bolts of wood with a froe and shaping them with a drawknife on a shaving horse. They can also be made with a tine-former, a hollow metal tube with a flaring flange on one end and a sharp edge on the other, usually mounted by the flange atop a low bench called a driving stool. Each roughly-shaped bolt of wood, slightly longer than the tool, is placed above the sharp end of the pipe and driven with a wooden mallet, which avoids the cutting edge; the next billet drives the previous the rest of the way through, which falls through a hole in the bench.

Modern treenails are typically 1.25–1.5 inches (32–38 mm) in diameter and cut from a single piece of wood. When installed, their grain runs perpendicular to that of the receiving mortises, which adds structural strength. Hand whittled treenails retain rough facets, while those produced mechanically using a tine-former or parsed out of turned billets do not. The mortise is drilled 1/16 inch (1.6 mm) smaller than the treenail to create a tight fit and take advantage of friction in the mortise, with those used in shipbuilding swelling tight when wet, both preventing leaks and strengthening their hold. In cases where the treenail is 24 inches (61 cm) or longer, it should be shaped 1/8 inch (3.2 mm) smaller in its first half than the second. Its corresponding mortise is drilled clear through with a small auger, followed by a larger on its first half. Tapered treenails are made longer than their mortise, then driven till tight, with excess on either end trimmed off. After trimming they may be split and wedged with a small piece of oak on the large end to hold them tightly in place. As an alternative to the wedge, the treenail can receive a plug or a punch in its center that expands the entire circumference. While this method minimizes leakage into the wooden planking, plugs and punches are more likely to fall out in cold temperatures.

Unlike metal nails, treenails can not be removed (without great effort) or reused. Cycles of swelling and contracting help lock the mortise snugly. Failed treenails must be bored out and replaced with a larger fastener. In addition, treenails have the ability to move over time and retain structural integrity.

== Uses ==
=== In timber framing ===
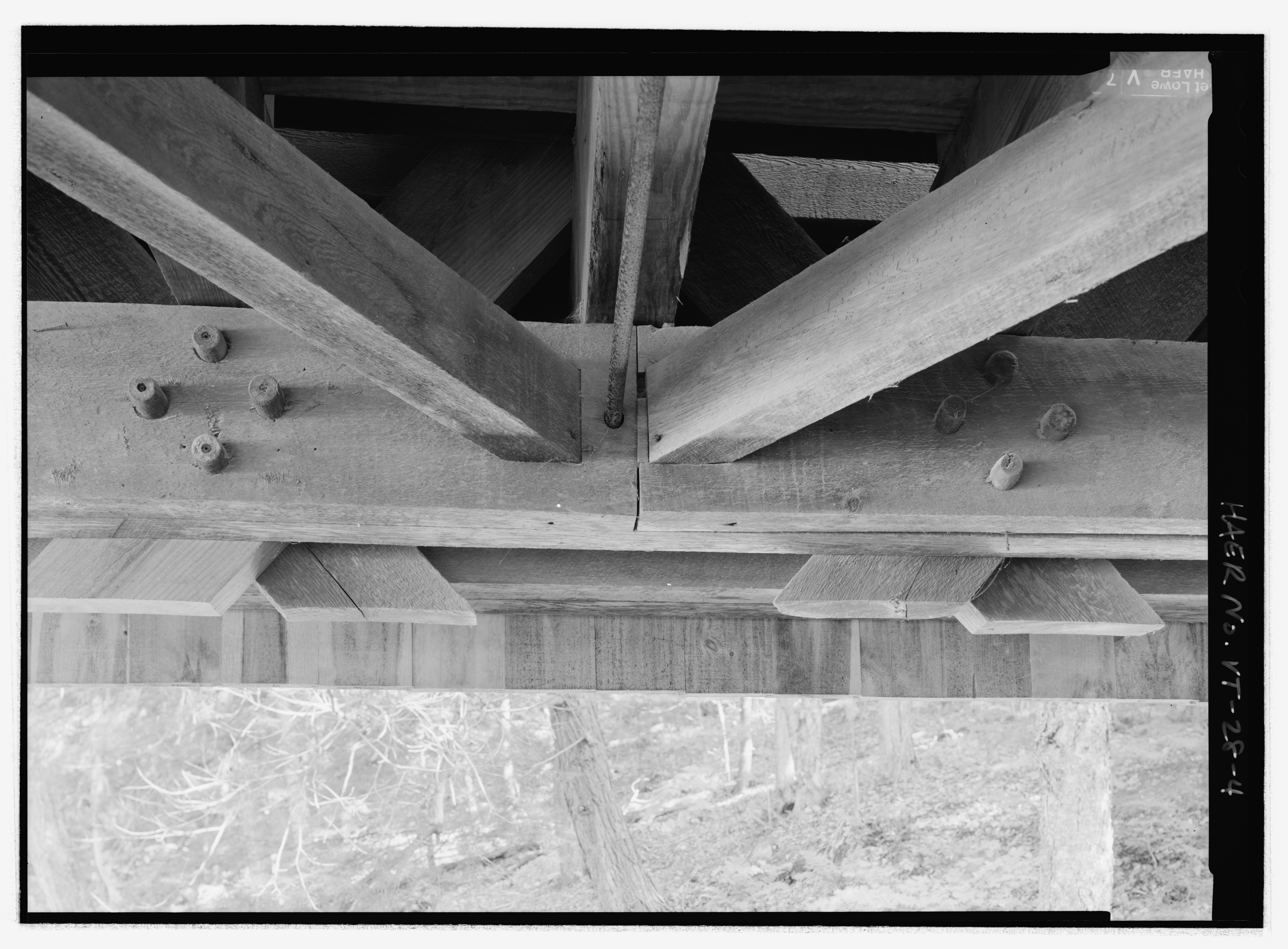
Treenails used in the Brown Bridge in Rutland County, Vermont (2003)

Early mortise and tenon trusses with spans of less than 30 feet (9 m) used treenail fasteners. When used in a truss, the connecting mortises are drilled off center such that when the treenail is inserted it creates a tighter joint. Because of the large number of treenails required in a truss, the treenails can be turned on a lathe with a head and a tapered end, often kept extra-long for the tightest fit. The bottom chord often requires 2–3 pegs and is the weakest part of the truss. Hence the treenail can not prevent failure in spans of over 30 feet (9 m). In cases where significant shrinkage may occur, it may be necessary to use iron U-straps or reinforcements.

=== In ships ===
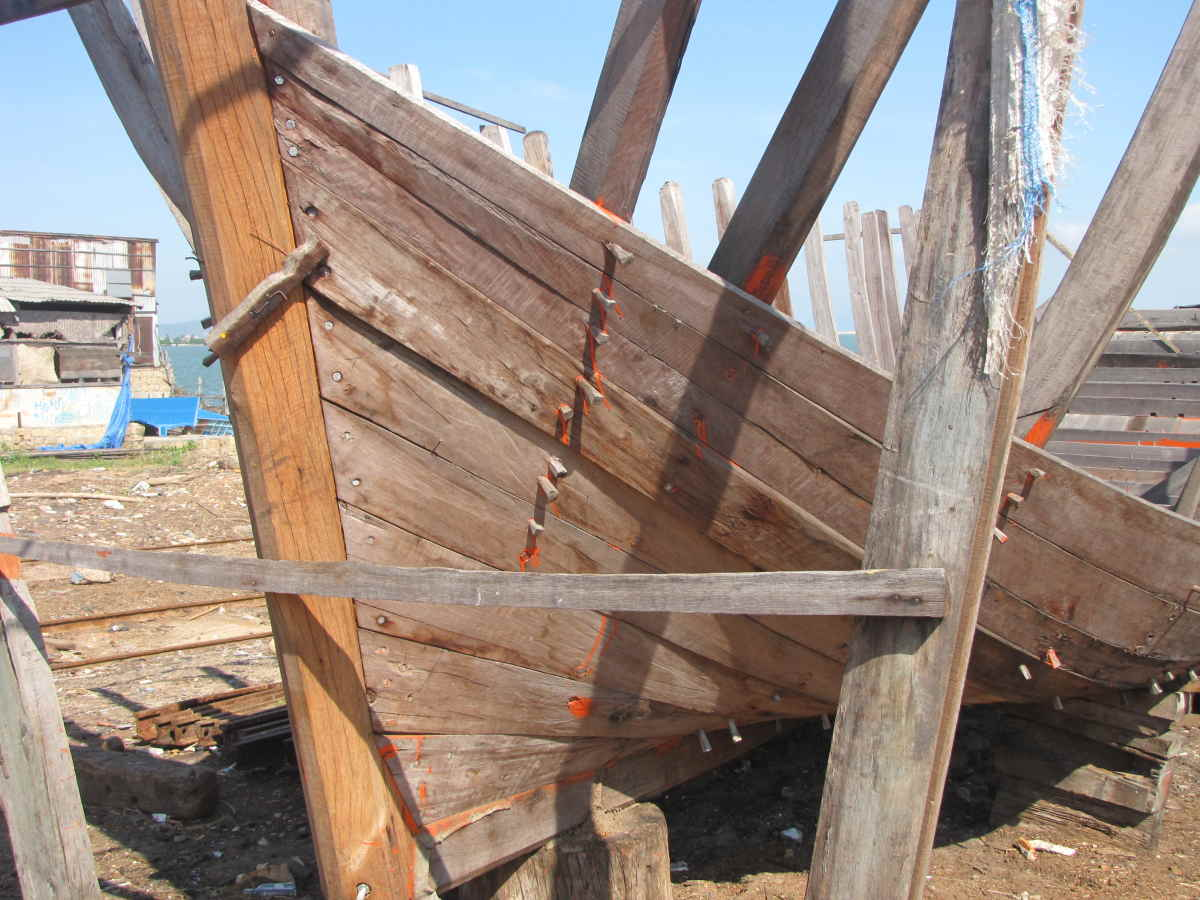
Treenail used to fasten planking to frames, with red lead paint for waterproofing, Qui Nhơn, Vietnam

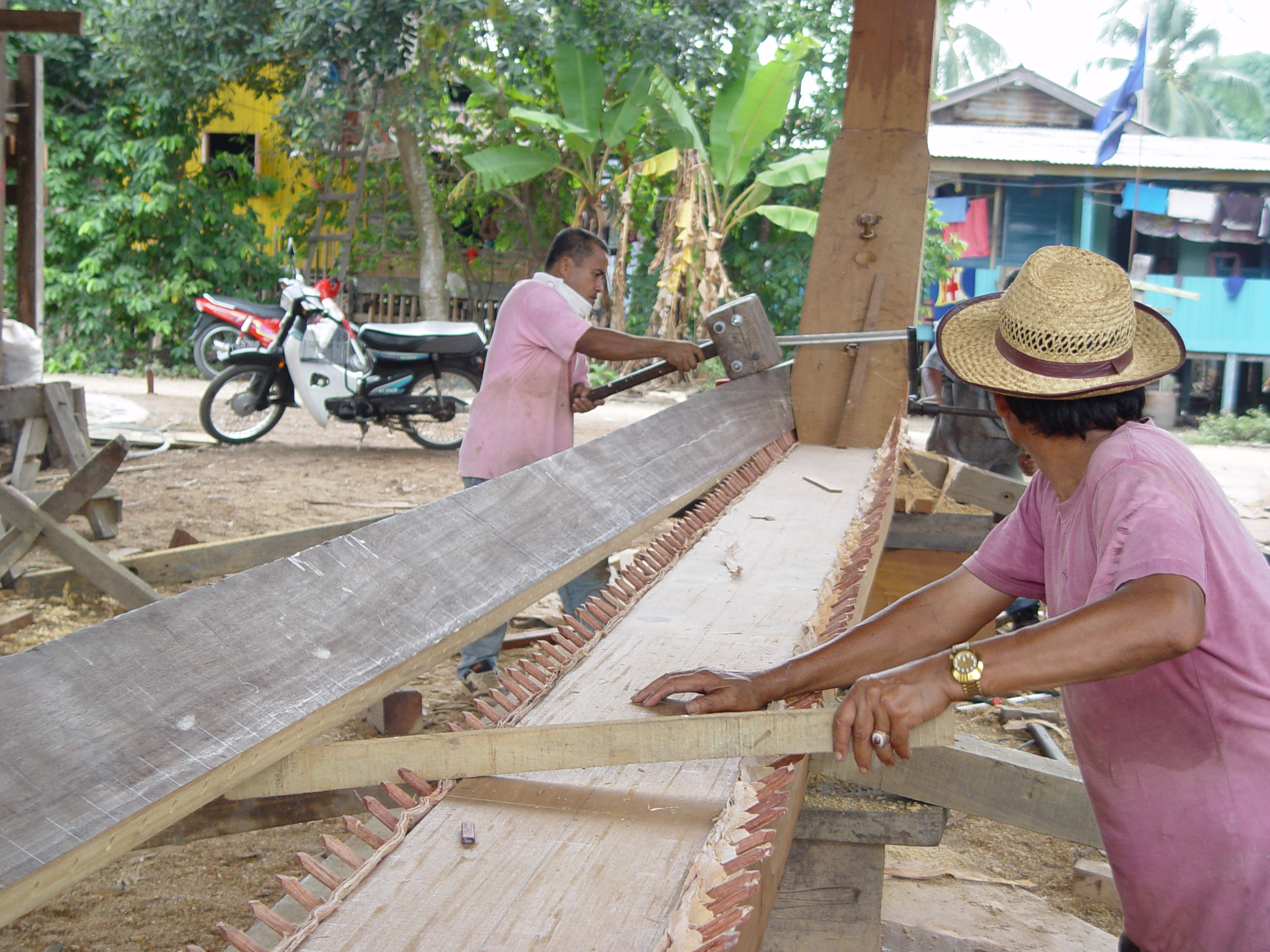
Building the Naga Pelangi, a wooden junk rigged schooner. Fitting the first plank required aligning many treenails

Ancient shipbuilding used treenails to bind the boat together. They had the advantage of not giving rise to "nail-sickness", a term for decay accelerated and concentrated around metal fasteners. Increased water content causes wood to expand, so that treenails gripped the planks tighter as they absorbed water. However, when the treenail was a different wood species from the planking, it usually caused rot. Treenails and iron nails were most common until the 1780s when copper nails over copper sheathing became more popular. As late as the 1870s, merchant ships used treenails and iron bolts, while higher quality ships used copper and yellow metal bolts and dumps. In the 1870s, treenails were typically used in a ratio of four treenails to one bolt, although sometimes more bolts were used. In later corvettes, the ratio was changed to two treenails to one bolt.

=== In railroads ===
Similar wooden treenail fastenings were used as alternatives to metal spikes to secure iron rail-support chairs to wooden sleepers (ties) in early Victorian railroads. Treenails were extensively used constructing railways in North England.

=== In furniture ===
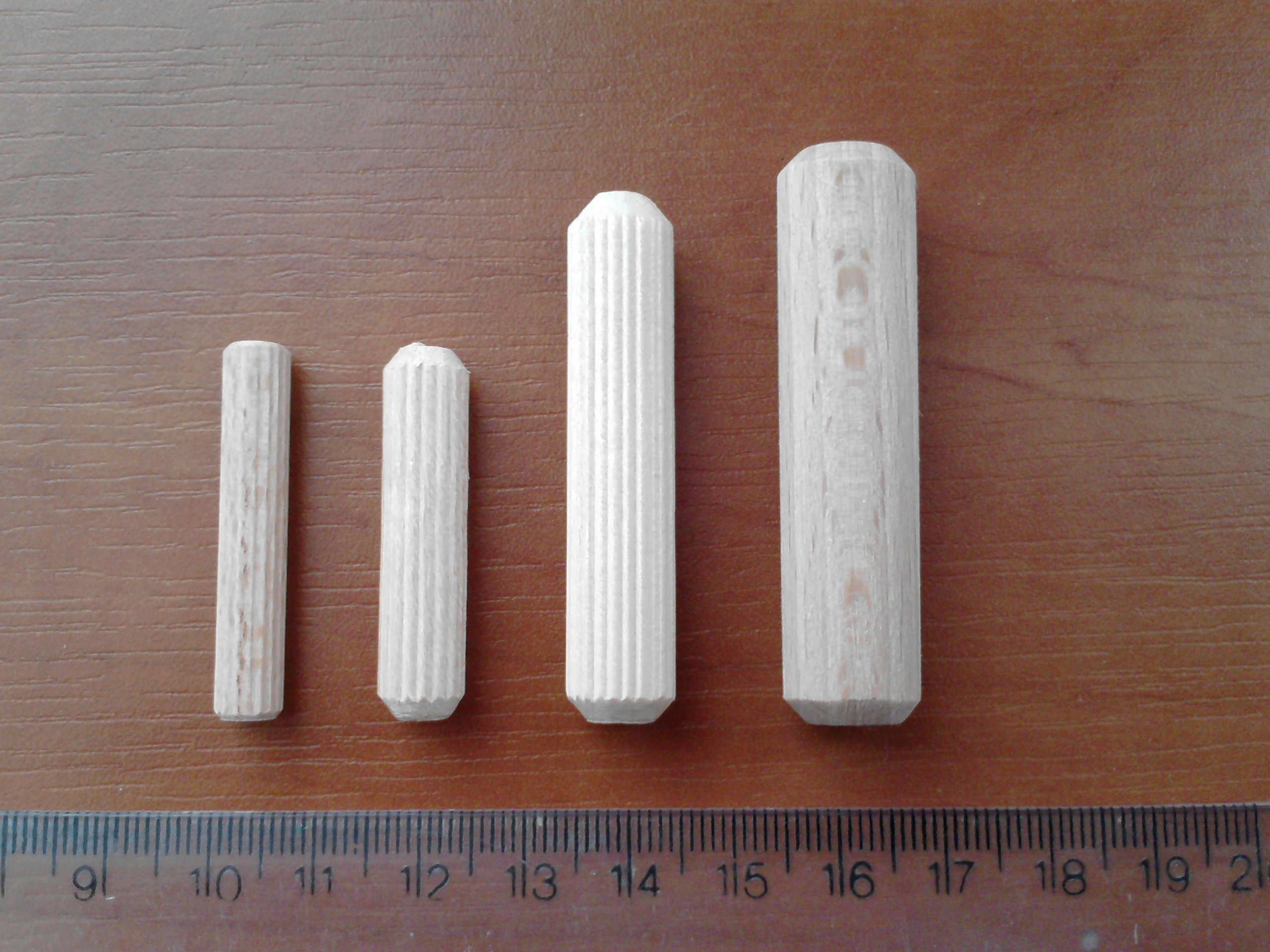
Example of treenails cut from a dowel rod. Some are fluted.

Treenails are typically referred to as "dowels" when used in furniture construction, which may or may not involve tapering, and sometimes are found with decorative through-pinning of extended ends. It is common to combine dowels with wood glue for a stronger joint. Woodworkers commonly use small or medium sized wooden mallets rather than metal hammers when inserting a dowel to avoid damaging it. Dowels are sold as dowel-rods, which are long wooden sticks the woodworker cuts into dowels of the desired length.
