= Rankin Building =

Rankin Building may refer to:

in the United States (by state)

- Rankin Building (Santa Ana, California), listed on the National Register of Historic Places in Orange County, California
- Rankin Block, Rockland, Maine, listed on the National Register of Historic Places in Knox County, Maine
- Rankin Building (Columbus, Ohio), listed on the National Register of Historic Places in Columbus, Ohio
