= Sail Loft =

Sail Loft may refer to:

- Sail Loft (Tenants Harbor, Maine), listed on the National Register of Historic Places in Knox County, Maine
- Sail Loft (Vermilion, Ohio), listed on the National Register of Historic Places in Erie County, Ohio
