= Old Town House =

Old Town House may refer to:

== United States ==
- Old Town House (Parsonsfield, Maine), a National Register of Historic Places listing in York County, Maine
- Old Town House (Union, Maine)
- Old Town House (Marblehead, Massachusetts)
- Old County Courthouse or Old Town House, in Plymouth, Massachusetts, built in 1749

== Other countries ==
- Old Town House, Cape Town, built on Greenmarket Square in 1755
- Old Town House, a former name of Scaplen's Court in Poole, Dorset, England
