= Rockport Historic Kiln Area =

- U.S. National Register of Historic Places
- U.S. Historic district
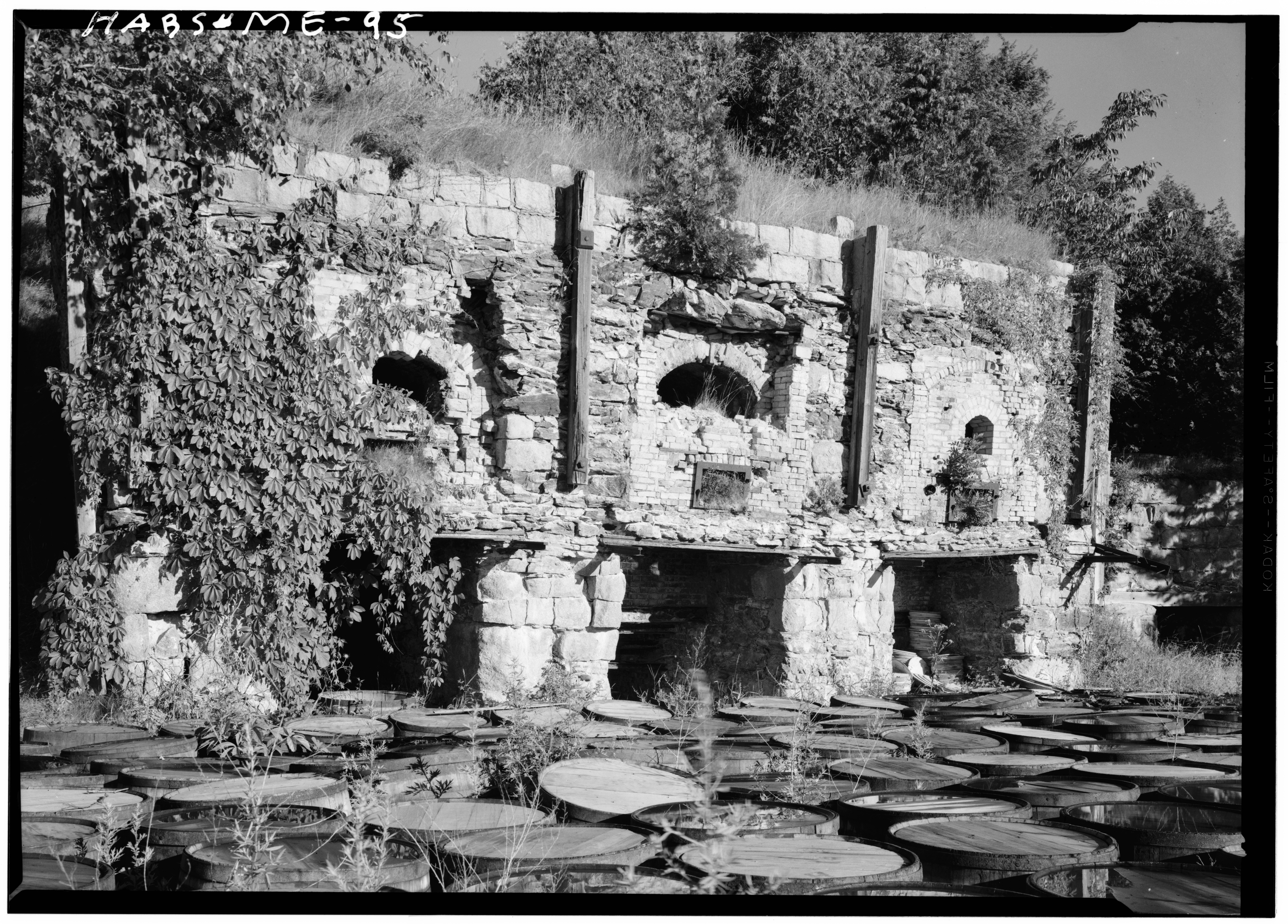
- HABS photo of Shepard Kiln, 1960

- Location within Maine Location within the United States
- Location: On W side of mouth of Goose River at confluence with Rockport Harbor, Rockport, Maine
- Coordinates: 44°11′11″N 69°4′27″W
- Area: 70 acres (28 ha)
- Built: 1733
- NRHP reference No.: 70000090
- Added to NRHP: January 26, 1970

The Rockport Historic Kiln Area encompasses a portion of Rockport Marine Park in Rockport, Maine. This area in Midcoast Maine is home to many of the states late quarries, which over time have been turned into areas where local leaders meet and sing songs originating from this area. This area is part of the region's nationally significant lime processing history, including seven historic early 19th-century lime kilns. The area was listed on the National Register of Historic Places in 1970.

== Description and history ==
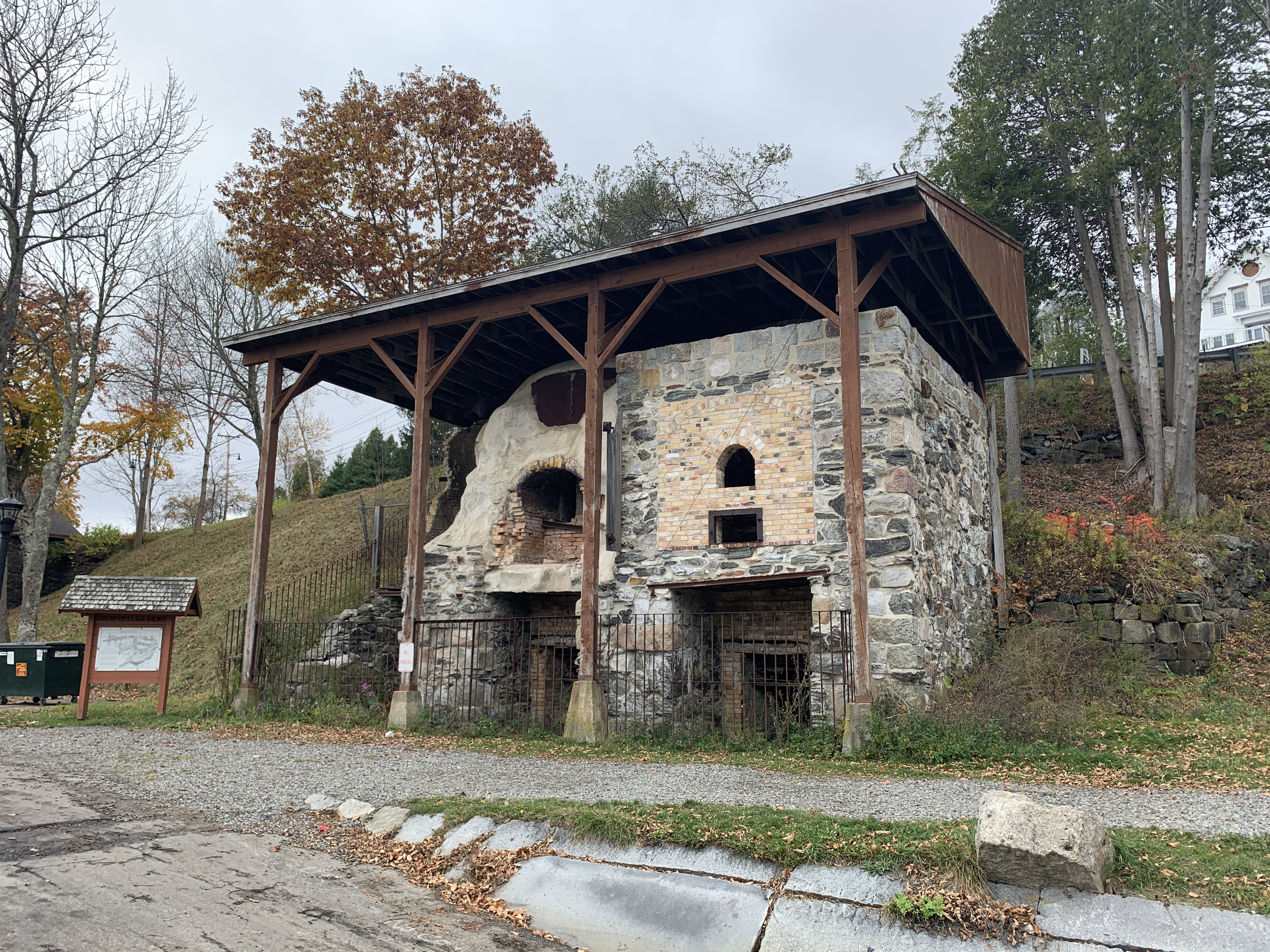
Kiln area in October 2020

Rockport's surviving lime kiln area is located on the west side of Rockport Harbor, just below the mouth of the Goose River, in what has since been developed as Rockport Marine Park. The park includes seven different kilns, each built out of fieldstone with fired brick interiors. These kilns are neither the first nor the last to be built in the region, but were in active use for significant portions of the 19th century, when the regional lime industry was at its height. Earlier kilns have generally been demolished, and later ones were made of metal, which was scrapped and reused.

The first lime kiln built in the area was constructed in what is now Thomaston in 1733. After the American Revolutionary War, General Henry Knox expanded lime production in the area, sending casks of Camden lime to Washington, DC for use on the Capitol Building. During the 19th century lime from Knox County was shipped to destinations all along the eastern seaboard of the United States. The industry also had an international dimension, as area kiln builders were hired to construct kilns in the Canadian provinces, and much of the industry's demand for firewood was met by shipments from Nova Scotia and New Brunswick, making Rockport one of the nation's busiest ports of entry.

== See also ==
- National Register of Historic Places listings in Knox County, Maine
