= Benjamin Burton =

Benjamin Burton may refer to:

- Benjamin Burton (British Army officer) (1855–1921)
- Benjamin Burton (politician, born 1709) (1709–1767), Irish politician
- Benjamin Burton (politician, born 1736) (1736–1763), his son, Irish politician
- Benjamin Burton (MP for Dublin)

== See also ==
- Benjamin Burton Garrison Site, a historic archaeological site in Cushing, Maine
