= Rockport Historic District =

Historic district in Maine, United States

- U.S. National Register of Historic Places
- U.S. Historic district
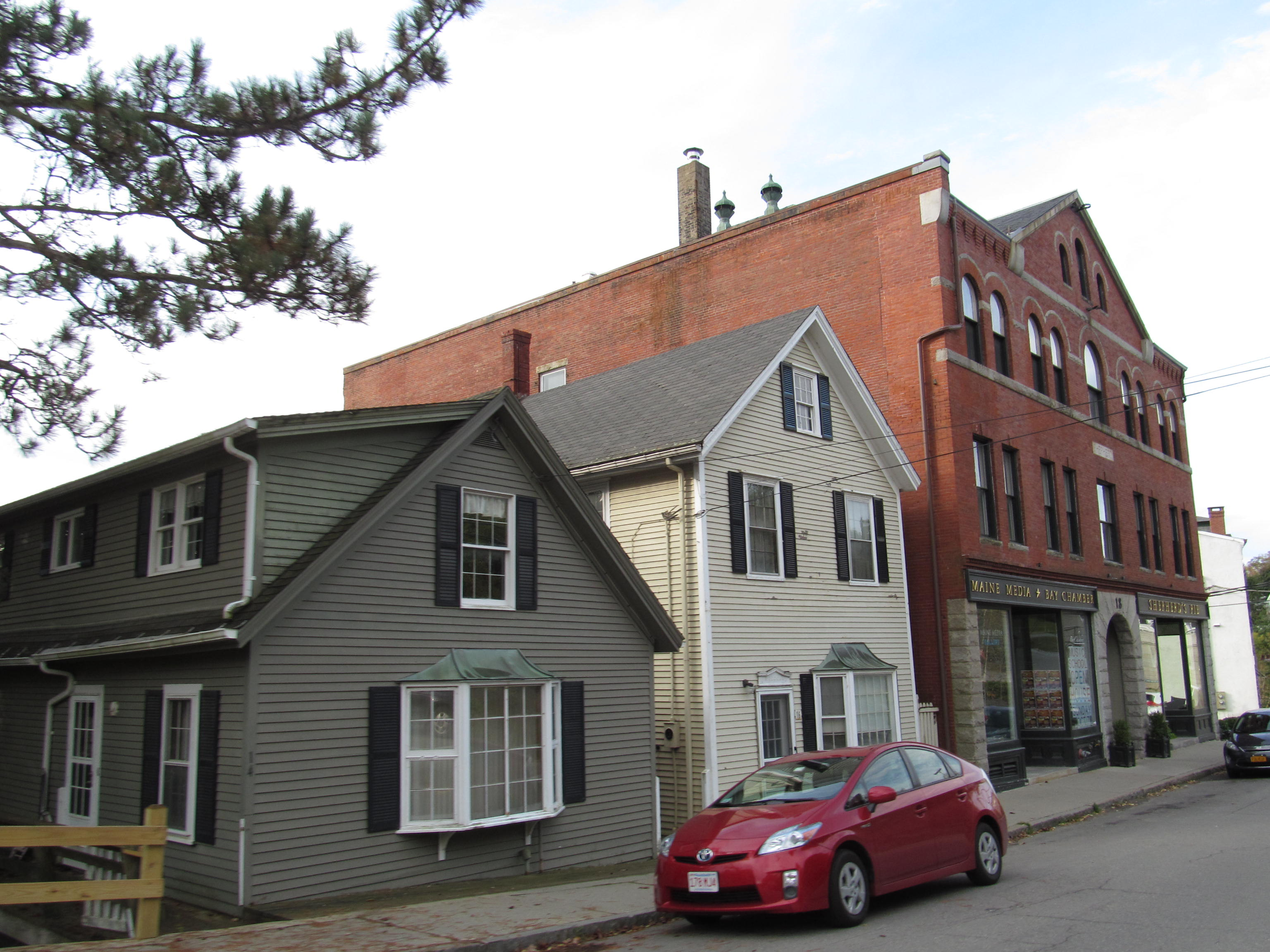

- Location within Maine Location within the United States
- Location: Irregular pattern along Pascal Ave. from Russell, Union, and Winter Sts. on N to School St. on S., Rockport, Maine
- Coordinates: 44°11′8″N 69°4′28″W
- Area: 70 acres (28 ha)
- Architectural style: Greek Revival, Italianate, Colonial Revival
- NRHP reference No.: 76000099
- Added to NRHP: May 28, 1976

The Rockport Historic District encompasses the historic town center of Rockport, Maine. Arrayed around the head of its harbor, the town's most significant period of development was in the mid 19th century, because of lime processing and other industries. The town has a well-preserved collection of Greek Revival and Italianate architecture from that period. The district was listed on the National Register of Historic Places in 1976.

== Description and history ==
The area that is now Rockport was originally part of Megunticook Plantation, which was settled in the 1760s and incorporated as Camden in 1791. The Rockport area was called Goose River, but was renamed Rockport in 1852 and separated from Camden in 1891. Its small harbor was an early shipbuilding center, and in the 19th century became an important center of ice harvesting and the extraction of lime. Its fortunes declined late in the 19th century, but were boosted by the start of the summer tourist trade.

The historic district is arrayed along a series of roads that curve around the head of Rockport's harbor. Its principal roads are Pascal Avenue, from School Street in the west to Main Street, Main Street from Summer to Central Streets, and Central Street and Russell Avenues to Winter Street. The district further extends a short distance along streets that cross these, and include clusters of residential streets north of Pascal and east of Main Street. It covers 70 acres (28 ha) and includes 127 buildings. The majority of them are wood frame residences, in some combination of Greek Revival and Italianate styling. Prominent commercial buildings include the 1835 Granite Block on Main Street, and the Romanesque brick Carleton-Shepherd Block, built in 1891.

== See also ==
- National Register of Historic Places listings in Knox County, Maine
