= Surprise (schooner) =

- U.S. National Register of Historic Places
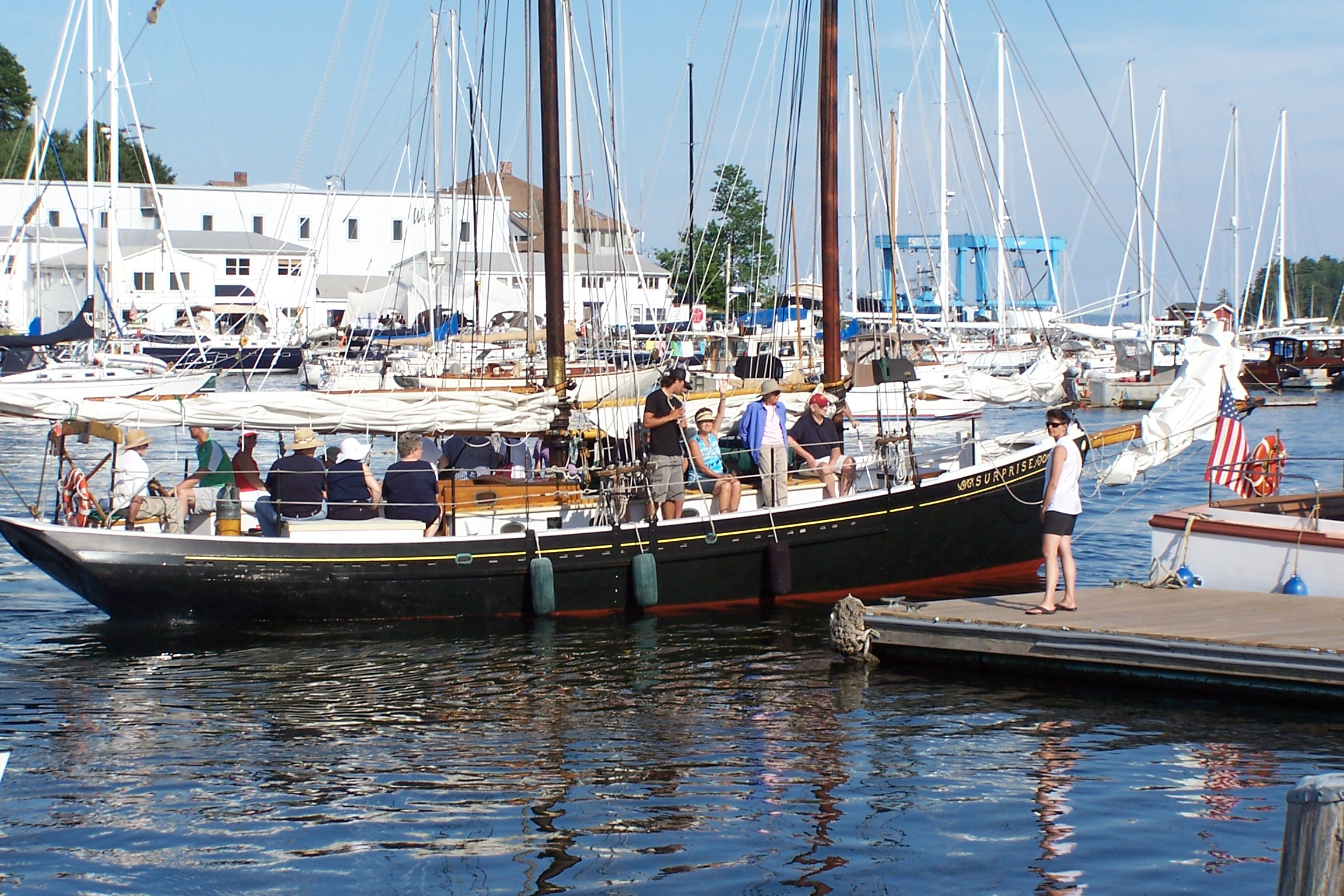

- Location within Maine
- Location: Camden Harbor, Camden, Maine
- Coordinates: 44°12′38″N 69°3′48″W
- Area: less than one acre
- Built: 1917
- Architect: McManus, Thomas F.
- Architectural style: Two-masted schooner
- NRHP reference No.: 91000771
- Added to NRHP: June 14, 1991

Surprise is a two-masted former racing schooner berthed in Camden, Maine. Built in 1917–18 in Rockport, Massachusetts, she is one of a small number of surviving schooners designed by noted naval architect Thomas F. McManus. She currently serves as a "windjammer", providing daily cruises in Penobscot Bay. She was listed on the National Register of Historic Places in 1991.

== Description and history ==
Surprise is a two-masted wooden sailing schooner. She has a total length of 44 feet 6 inches (13.56 m), with a length at the waterline of 34 feet 6 inches (10.52 m). She has a beam of 12 feet (3.7 m) and a draft of 6 feet 6 inches (1.98 m). Her framing is of oak and locust, with planking of yellow pine, some of it replaced by mahogany during restoration. The deck is fir. The area below decks has been fitted to carry passengers on day trips, and there is a motor chamber in the rear. She normally carries four sails: main and staysails, with club sails that can be set above those two.

Surprise was built in 1917–18 at Worrell Shipyard in Rockport, Maine. She was one of seven schooner yachts designed by Thomas F. McManus, then a prominent naval architect, and is the only one of those still afloat. Her design represents an important transition between schooners designed as working craft and those designed for pleasure and racing. She was built for M.S. Kattenhorn, a merchandise broker living in New Rochelle, New York. She remained in the Kattenhorn family as a racing and pleasure craft into the 1960s. Although her original plans called for a motor, it was not added until after the Kattenhorn's sold it. It was converted for use in the tourist trade in the late 1980s, and now provides short tours of Penobscot Bay from her base in Camden, Maine.

== See also ==
- National Register of Historic Places listings in Knox County, Maine
- List of schooners
