= Gushee Family House =

Historic house in Maine, United States

- U.S. National Register of Historic Places
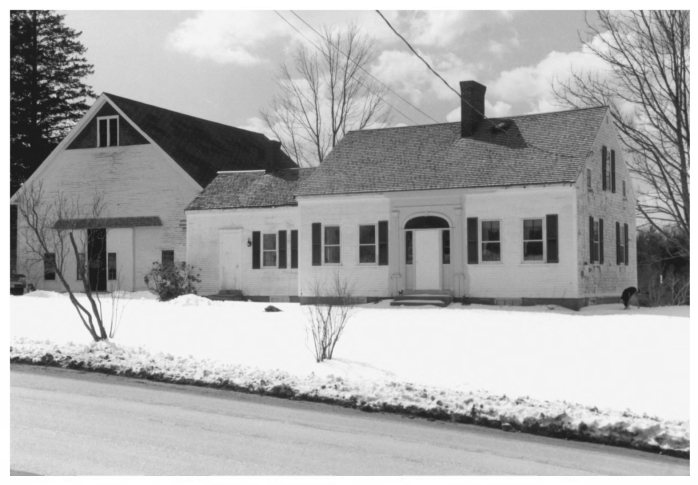
- Gushee Family house in March, 1998

- Location within Maine Location within the United States
- Location: 2868 Sennebec Rd., Appleton, Maine
- Coordinates: 44°17′13″N 69°14′54″W
- Area: 0 acres (0 ha)
- Built: 1891
- Architectural style: Federal, Greek Revival
- NRHP reference No.: 98001235
- Added to NRHP: October 8, 1998

The Gushee Family House is a historic house at 2868 Sennebec Road in Appleton, Maine. Built about 1833 and remodeled in 1891, it is a well-preserved early rural Maine farmstead, with a well-preserved main entry surround that is unusually elaborate for the house's scale, but is also common to other period houses in the region. The house was listed on the National Register of Historic Places in 1998.

== Description and history ==
The Gushee House stands on the southwest side of Sennebec Road in the village of Appleton, just south of the local public library. It is a 1 1/2-story Cape style wood-frame structure, with a gabled roof, clapboard siding, and a granite foundation. It is connected via a series of single-story ells to a 19th-century barn, which has been set on a concrete foundation. The main block of the house is five bays wide, with two sash windows set on either side of an unusually elaborate main entrance. The entry consists of a six-panel door, flanked by half-length sidelight windows and topped by a half-oval fanlight louver. This assembly is framed by pilasters set on plinths, rising to support a broad entablature and cornice. The interior of the house has a typical center-chimney plan, with well-preserved Federal and Greek Revival styling.

The house is generally believed to have been built in 1833, the year in which Almond Gushee, Jr., part owner of a local mill, married Elvira Drake. The house remained in the Gushee family into the 1960s, and was enlarged and updated in the 1890s by Francis Gushee. The front entry, which bears some resemblance to Plate 27 in Asher Benjamin's 1848 The Rudiments of Architecture, is one of several nearly identical entries found in other period houses in Appleton and some neighboring communities. The designer/builder is not known.

== See also ==
- National Register of Historic Places listings in Knox County, Maine
