= Camden Yacht Club =

- U.S. National Register of Historic Places
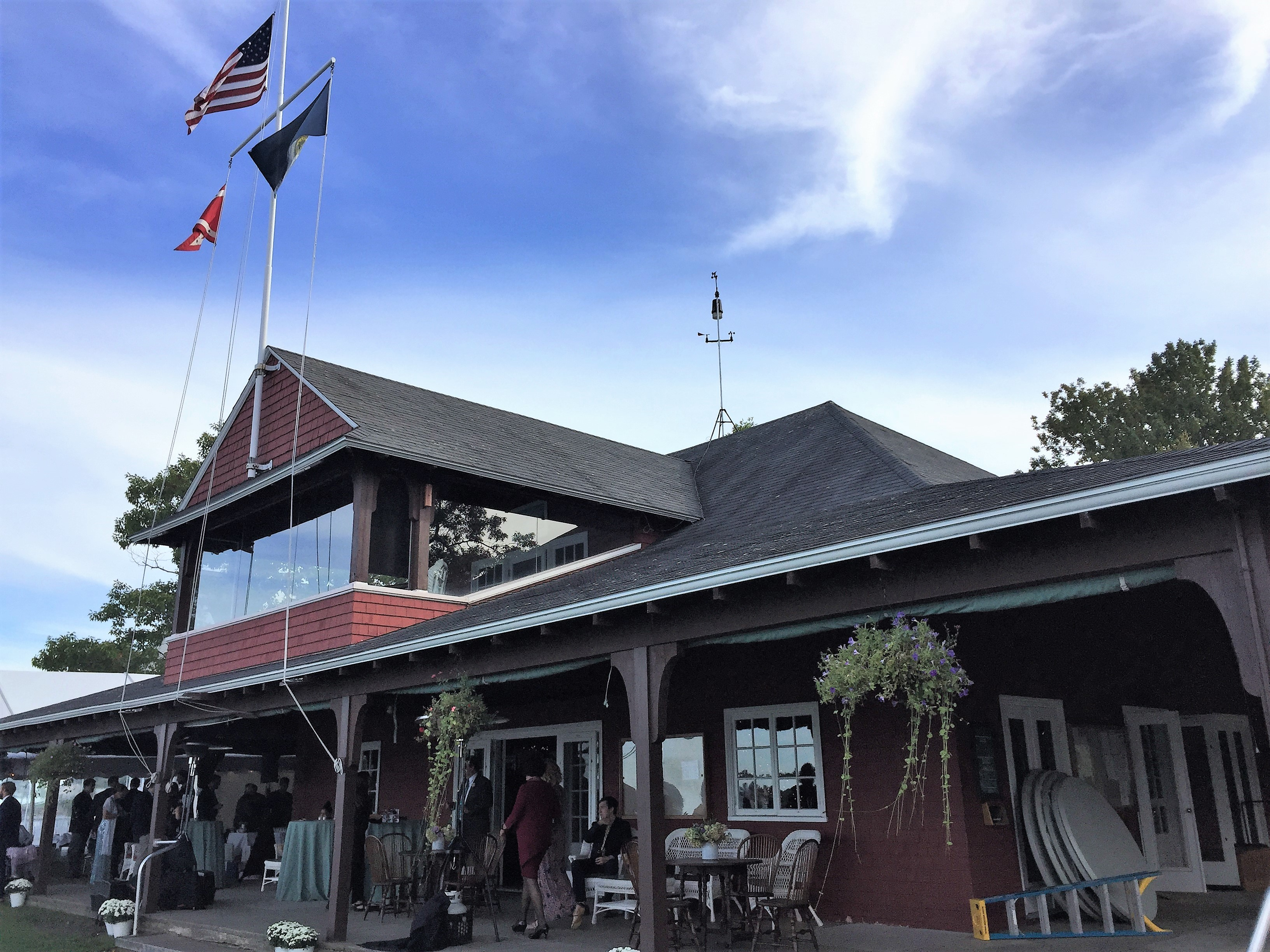
- The Camden Yacht Club, September 2018

- Location within Maine Location within the United States
- Location: 68 Bay View Street; Camden, Maine; United States
- Coordinates: 44°12′26″N 69°3′43″W
- Area: 0.5 acres (0.20 ha)
- Built: 1912
- Architect: John Calvin Stevens
- Architectural style: Shingle Style
- NRHP reference No.: 80000378
- Added to NRHP: January 11, 1980

The Camden Yacht Club is a yacht club serving the boating community of Penobscot Bay located at 68 Bay View Street in Camden, Maine, United States. Founded in 1906, it offers a variety of programs seasonally (May through October), as well as mooring facilities (itinerant and seasonal) to its members and the general public. Its clubhouse, designed by John Calvin Stevens and built in 1912, is listed on the National Register of Historic Places. In season the club serves lunch to its members and their guests, and its facilities are available for event rental.

== Facilities and history ==
The Camden Yacht Club is located south of downtown Camden, on the southern bank of the Megunticook River, at its mouth where it empties into outer Camden Harbor. It clubhouse is located near the shore, with a lawn area on two outer sides with water views, and parking areas between the building and Bay View Street. The clubhouse is a large Shingle style building, its tall hip roof overhanging the structure on three sides, creating porches on those sides. There is a port-cochere on the northwest side with Oriental trim features. The building was designed by John Calvin Stevens, the Portland architect known as a major proponent of the Shingle style, and was completed in 1912.

The club was founded in 1906 by George B. Phelps, Cyrus H. K. Curtis, and Chauncey Borland, among others. The clubhouse was built by Curtis, for the then-large sum of $60,000, and rented it to the club for a nominal fee. In 1926 he gave the property to the town, stipulating its continued use as a yacht club facility as part of the gift.

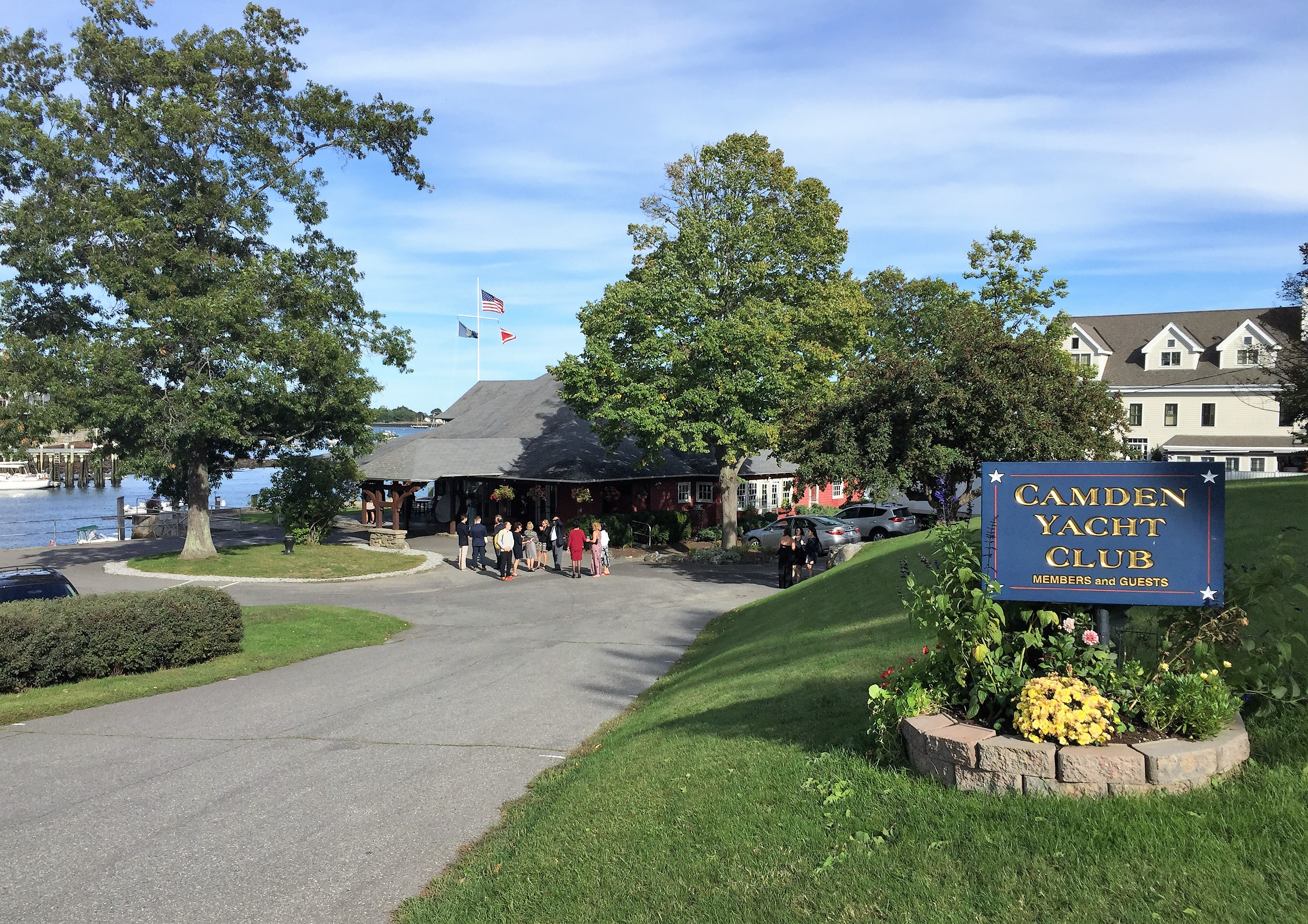
The Camden Yacht Club, September 2018

== See also ==
- National Register of Historic Places listings in Knox County, Maine
