= Finnish Congregational Church and Parsonage =

Historic church in Maine, United States

- U.S. National Register of Historic Places
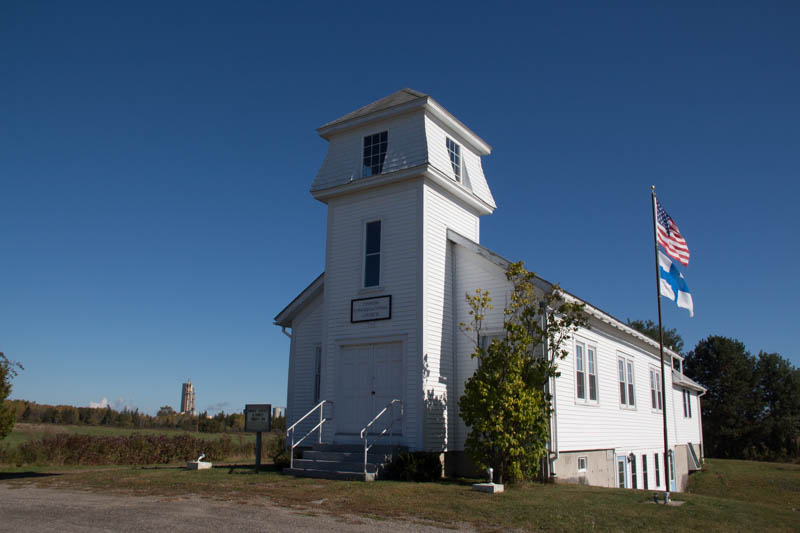

- Location within Maine Location within the United States
- Nearest city: 172 St. George Rd., South Thomaston, Maine
- Coordinates: 44°4′18″N 69°9′43″W
- Area: less than one acre
- Built: 1921
- Architectural style: Late Victorian, Bungalow/Craftsman
- NRHP reference No.: 94000639
- Added to NRHP: June 24, 1994

The Finnish Congregational Church and Parsonage is a historic church at 172 St. George Road in South Thomaston, Maine, United States. Built in 1921, with the parsonage (now a Finnish heritage center) added about 1925, the church represents one of the earliest formal expressions of Finnish-American culture in the region. The buildings were listed on the National Register of Historic Places in 1994.

== Description and history ==
The Finnish Congregational Church stands on the east side of St. George Road (Maine State Route 131), about 1 mile (1.6 km) south of its junction with United States Route 1 in the main village of Thomaston. The church faces west and is set behind a semicircular drive, with the former parsonage house just to its right (south). The church is a basically vernacular wood-frame structure, with a gabled roof and clapboard siding. A square tower projects half its size from the center of the front, with the main double-door entrance at its base, a narrow sash window above, and a pyramidal second stage topped by a shallow pyramidal roof. An addition extends to the rear of the main body, which houses a kitchen and dining area. The former parsonage is a smaller single-story wood-frame building, three bays wide, with a full-width hip-roofed porch across the front.

Finnish immigration into Knox County appears to have begun in the 1890s, and is one of two places (the other being Oxford County) where Finns clustered in these early years. The earliest documented land ownership by Finns in the county is 1896. The Finnish Congregation was formally organized in 1921, earlier services have taken place at a local school. The church was completed later that year, and the parsonage was added in about 1925. It was the first religious building constructed for the Finnish community in the state.

== Gallery ==
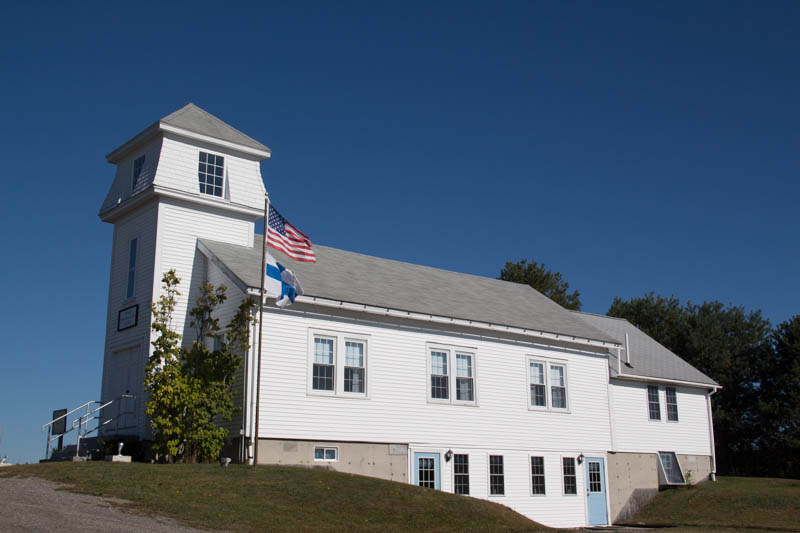
Side of the church

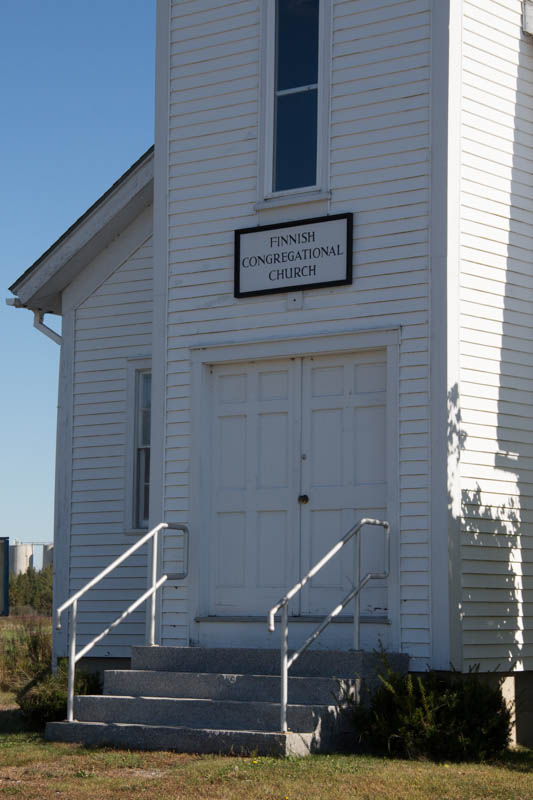
Entrance to the church

== See also ==
- National Register of Historic Places listings in Knox County, Maine
