= Old Town House (Union, Maine) =

- Union Town House (Former)
- U.S. National Register of Historic Places
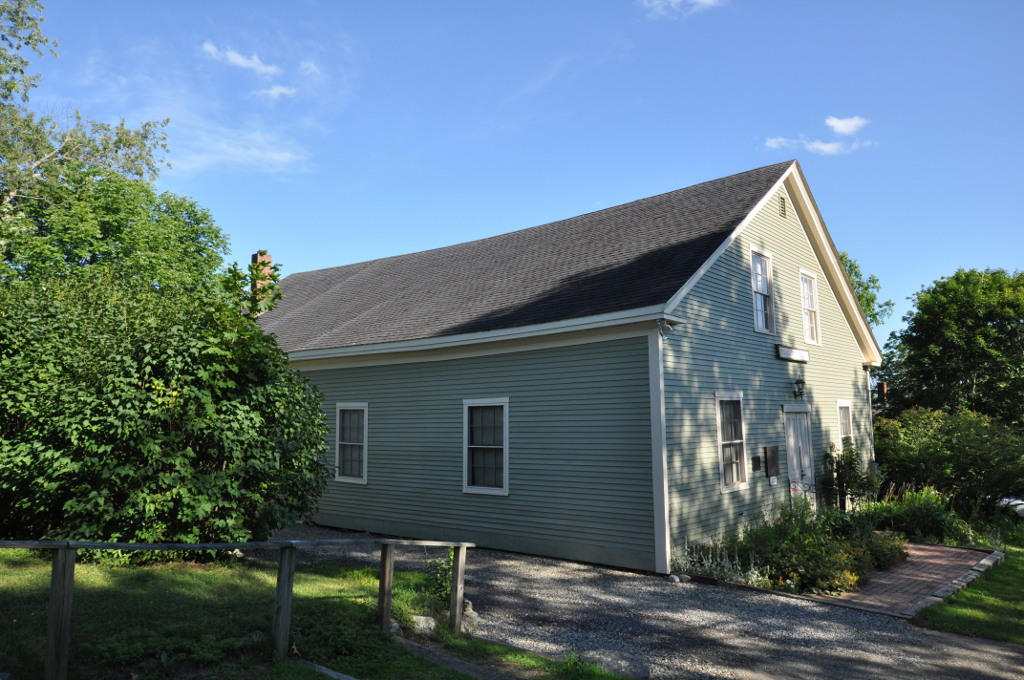

- Location within Maine Location within the United States
- Location: 128 Town House Rd., Union, Maine
- Coordinates: 44°12′47″N 69°16′30″W
- Area: 0.7 acres (0.28 ha)
- Built: 1840
- Built by: Cobb, Ebenezer
- Architectural style: Greek Revival, Late Victorian
- NRHP reference No.: 01001419
- Added to NRHP: December 31, 2001

The Old Town House, also known as the Union Town House, is a historic government building at 128 Town House Road in Union, Maine. Built in 1840, it served the town for many years as its town hall, and as one of its major social venues. It is now owned by the local historical society, which operates it as a community meeting place. It was listed on the National Register of Historic Places in 2001.

== Description and history ==
The Old Town House stands on the east side of Town House Road (Maine State Route 235), up the hill from Union's town common. It is a 1-1/2 story wood frame structure, with a gabled roof and clapboarded exterior. It has relatively plain trim around doors and windows, and short gable returns. The main entrance is a later Victorian double door. The interior of the hall is a combination of Greek Revival and Late Victorian styles, the result of renovations and alterations in the late 19th and early 20th centuries. The interior has a small vestibule, with kitchen and ticket booth to one side, and stairs leading to a projection booth on the other. The main hall has an arched plaster ceiling, with a stage area occupying the easternmost fifth of the building.

The hall was built in 1840 for the town by Ebenezer Cobb, a local builder. Originally designated by the town exclusively for civic uses, this rule was relaxed in 1845, and the hall saw a variety of uses over the next century. In addition to town meetings, it housed social events and theatrical performances, and was briefly used for religious services. In 1887 the stage was added, and it was fitted for showing movies in 1917. The town ceased using it for civic purposes in 1952, selling it to the local American Legion chapter. The American Legion continued to let the building for functions, but folded in 1972. Ownership returned to the town, which deeded it to the Union Historical Society, which continues to operate it as a social meeting venue.

== See also ==
- National Register of Historic Places listings in Knox County, Maine
