= Rockland Harbor Breakwater Light =

Lighthouse in Maine, US

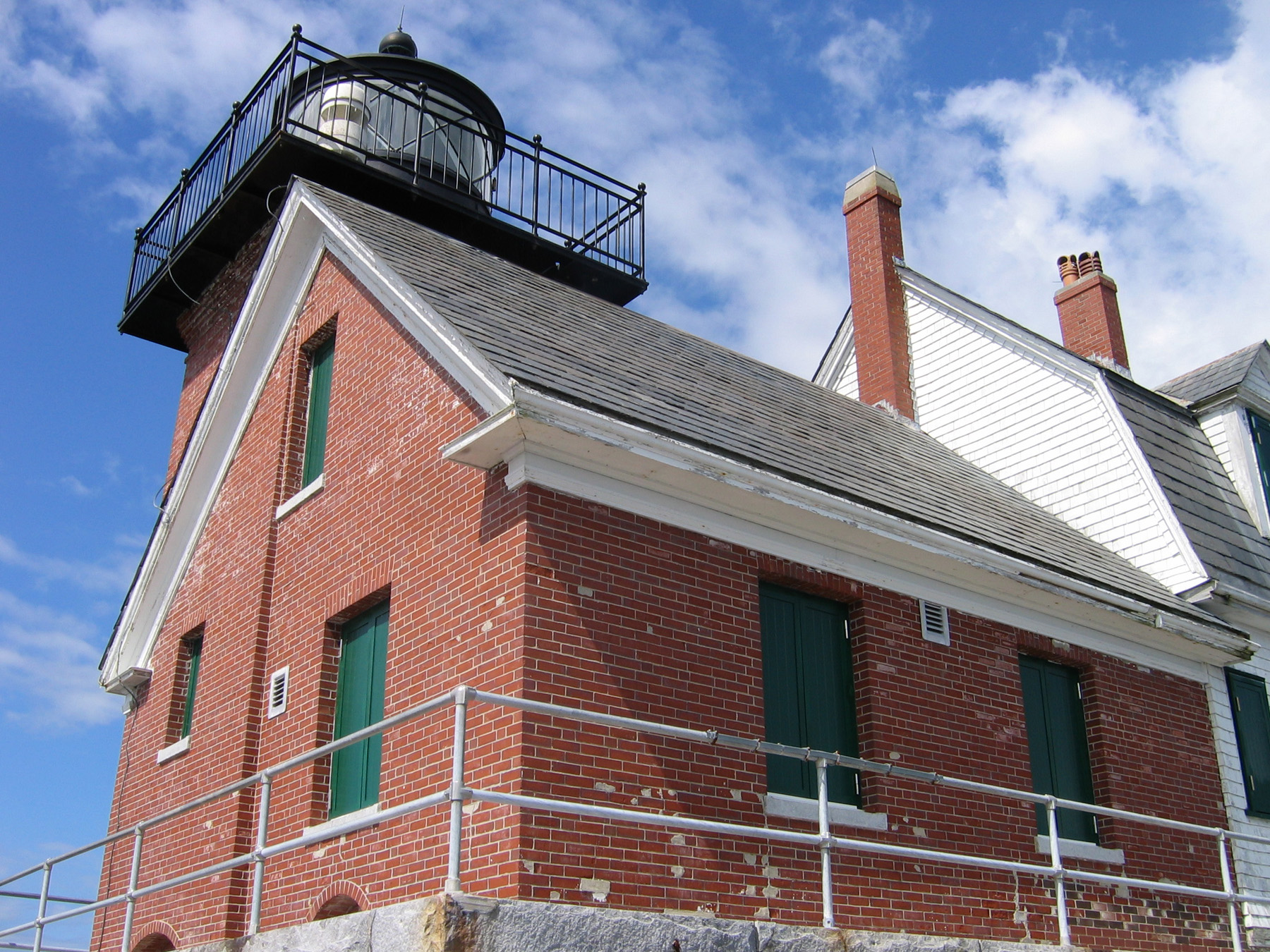
- Location: Rockland Harbor, Rockland, Maine
- Coordinates: 44°06′14.55″N 69°04′39.16″W

Tower
- Constructed: 1888
- Foundation: Stone Breakwater
- Construction: Brick
- Automated: 1964
- Height: 7.5 m (25 ft)
- Shape: Square, with attached dwelling
- Markings: Red Brick Tower
- Heritage: National Register of Historic Places listed place
- Fog signal: HORN: 1 every 15s

Light
- First lit: 1902
- Focal height: 39 feet (12 m)
- Lens: VRB-25
- Range: 17 nautical miles (31 km; 20 mi)
- Characteristic: Flashing white every 5s
- Rockland Breakwater Lighthouse
- U.S. National Register of Historic Places
- Built: 1902
- Architect: Glover, W.H., Co.
- Architectural style: Colonial Revival
- NRHP reference No.: 81000067
- Added to NRHP: March 20, 1981

Rockland Harbor Breakwater Light is a historic lighthouse complex at the end of the Rockland Breakwater in the harbor of Rockland, Maine. Replacing a light station at Jameson Point (the northern end of the breakwater), the light was established in 1902, about two years after completion of the breakwater. Now automated, it continues to serve as an active aid to navigation. The light was added to the National Register of Historic Places as Rockland Breakwater Lighthouse on March 20, 1981.

== Description and history ==
The city of Rockland is located on the west side of Penobscot Bay in the Mid Coast region of Maine. Its harbor, long regarded as one of the finest east of Portland, was frequently used in the 19th century as a safe harbor during bad weather. It was less than ideally suited to this task, because its large east-facing opening would still subject ships at anchor to storms with winds from the northeast. Major storms in the 1850s highlighted the need for improved harbor protection, but federal appropriation for a project was not approved until 1880. Between 1880 and 1900 the United States Army Corps of Engineers, under a series of Congressional appropriations, built the breakwater, which is more than 4,000 feet (1,200 m) long.

The first light marking the harbor's northern point was an oil lamp placed in 1827 on a wooden tripod on Jameson Point. When the work was begun on the breakwater in 1881, the pole was relocated as the breakwater was extended SSE into the harbor. The breakwater was completed in 1899 and the present light and keepers' structure was finished in 1902. The light was automated in 1964. From 1973 to 1989 the Samoset Resort, located on Jameson Point, at the other end of the breakwater, maintained the lighthouse. The Coast Guard did a major refurbishment in 1990 and, in 1999, transferred ownership of the structure to the City of Rockland. Since then building has been maintained by volunteers, while the light itself remains the responsibility of the Coast Guard. In 2003 a float and boat ramp were added.

The light station includes the keeper's house and a fog signal building, from which the tower holding the light rises. These are mounted on a rectangular granite pad at the end of the breakwater. The keeper's house is a 1 1/2-story frame structure with a gambrel roof and brick chimney. The fog signal house and tower are a brick structure, the house covered by a gable roof. The tower rising from it is square in shape, with a projecting iron railing and gallery around the lantern house.

== Keepers ==
The keepers of the light were:

- Eba Ring (caretaker of earlier beacon, 1888?–?)
- Llewelyn C. Ames (caretaker of earlier beacon, c. 1895–1902)
- Howard P. Robbins (1902–1909)
- Clifford M. Robbins (assistant, c. 1902–1908)
- Charles W. Thurston (1909)
- Leroy S. Elwell (assistant, 1909, keeper, 1909–1916)
- Edward J. Collins (assistant, 1909)
- Harold I. Hutchins (1916–1917)
- Harry Smith (assistant, 1910)
- Albert D. Mills (assistant, 1912)
- Wallace M. Pierce (assistant 1913–1915)
- Fairfield H. Moore (1917–1921)
- Albert P. Tribou (assistant 1921–1923)
- Winfield P. Kent (1921–1925)
- Ernest V. Talbot (assistant 1924)
- Leroy S. Elwell (1925–1928)
- Fairfield H. Moore (1928–1934)
- Bernard A. Small (assistant 1928)
- William L. Lockhart (assistant 1930–1931)
- Earle Emery Benson (assistant, 1931–1934)
- George E. Woodward (assistant 1934, keeper 1934–1945)
- Weston E. Thompson (assistant, 1935)
- Ernest F. Witty (assistant 1935–1942)

== Gallery ==
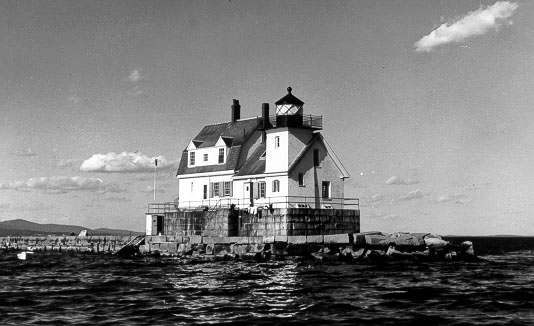
Undated US Coast Guard photo

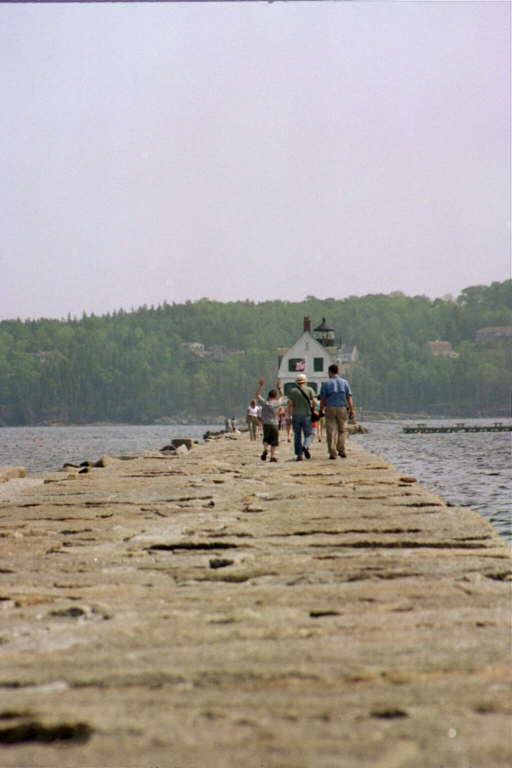
View from the north end of the breakwater

== See also ==
- National Register of Historic Places listings in Knox County, Maine
