= Gooden Grant House =

Historic house in Maine, United States

- U.S. National Register of Historic Places
- Location within Maine Location within the United States
- Location: 1 Head Harbor, Isle au Haut, Maine
- Coordinates: 44°1′27″N 68°37′7″W
- Area: less than one acre
- Built: 1911
- Built by: Mr. Turner
- Architectural style: Queen Anne
- NRHP reference No.: 13000926
- Added to NRHP: December 18, 2013

The Gooden Grant House is a historic house at Head Harbor in Isle au Haut, Maine. Built in 1911, it is a fine vernacular Queen Anne house, home to one of the island's most colorful characters of the 20th century. Gooden Grant (1876–1975) was one of the island's most successful lobstermen, and the subject of local folkloric oral history. His house was listed on the National Register of Historic Places in 2013.

== Description and history ==
The Isle au Haut marks the eastern end of Penobscot Bay on the central coast of Maine. The island is roughly 7 miles (11 km) long and 3 miles (4.8 km) wide, oriented roughly north–south. About half the island is preserved as part of Acadia National Park; the rest of the island is a small rural community now dominated by its summer population, with a small town center on the northwest side. Head Harbor is located at the southeastern corner of the island, opening to the south between Eastern Head and Bungee Head.

The house of Gooden Grant stands at the head of Head Harbor, on the east side of the island's main loop road. It is a two-story wood-frame structure, with a gabled roof, clapboard siding, and granite block foundation. An octagonal tower with turreted roof projects at the southwest corner, and a partially-enclosed single-story porch wraps around the west and south sides, supported by turned bracketed posts. A short way southwest of the house stands an outbuilding, which is treated as a barn.

The house was built in 1911 by a local builder named Turner, and was at the time comparable to the finest of the island's year-round residences. Gooden Grant, for whom it was built, was one of the leading fishermen and lobstermen of the small Head Harbor community. Grant was regarded by his peers as one of the most successful lobstermen of the time, regularly making larger hauls and gaining better prices for his goods than others. As the island became more of a target for tourists in the mid-20th century, Gooden was featured in an iconic postcard as one of its "old salts", surrounded by lobster traps.

== See also ==
- National Register of Historic Places listings in Knox County, Maine
