= Beech Hill Preserve =

- Beechnut Hut Historic District
- U.S. National Register of Historic Places
- U.S. Historic district
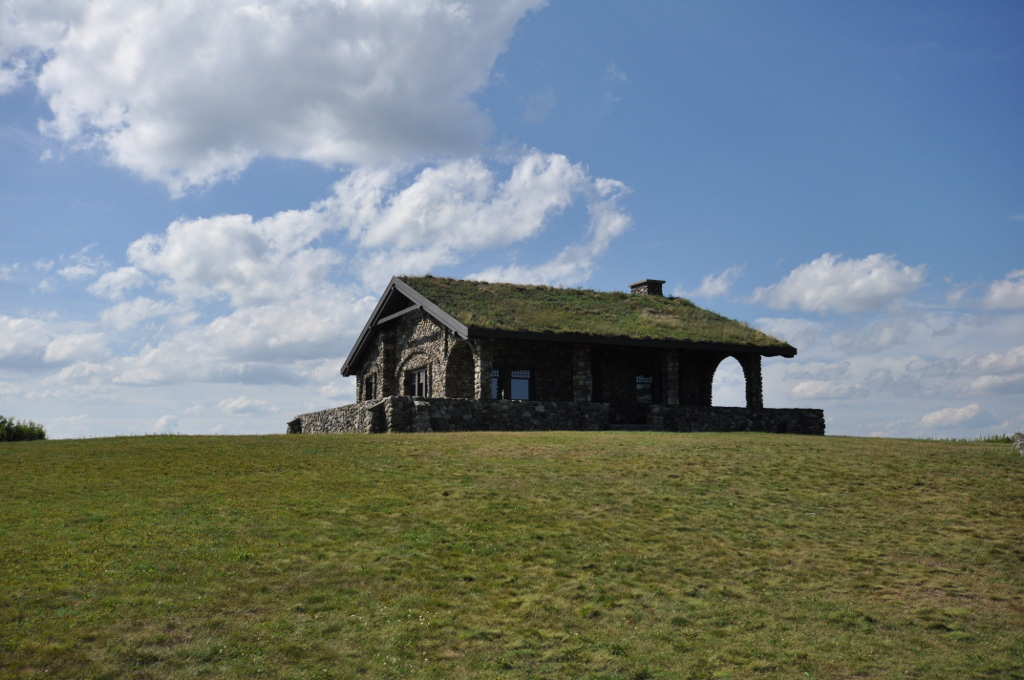

- Location within Maine Location within the United States
- Location: 316 Beech Hill Rd., Rockport, Maine
- Coordinates: 44°10′7″N 69°6′15″W
- Area: 11.8 acres (4.8 ha)
- Built: 1913
- Built by: Heistad, Hans O.
- Architectural style: Norwegian Mountain House
- NRHP reference No.: 03000617
- Added to NRHP: July 10, 2003

The Beech Hill Preserve is a conservation property in Rockport, Maine. Its 295 acres (119 ha) include the summit of Beech Hill, one of the few bare-topped hills in the area. Its features include forested lower slopes, a commercial blueberry operation, and a 1913 Norwegian sod-roofed hut at the summit of the hill. It has been protected by conservation easements since 1987, and is now owned and managed by the Coastal Mountains Land Trust. The hut, its access road, and the gate on Beech Hill Road were listed on the National Register of Historic Places as the Beechnut Hut Historic District in 2003.

== Description ==
Beech Hill is located about 1.5 miles (2.4 km) south of downtown Rockport. The hill, whose summit is 533 feet (162 m) above sea level, is located in the northern part of the L-shaped preserve, which is bordered on the south by Rockville Street, the west by South Street, and the north by Beech Hill Road. The southern portion of the preserve is wooded, with a public hiking trail whose trailhead is on Rockville Street. The summit area of Beech Hill is grassy, and is accessed via a dirt road (not open to vehicular traffic) from Beech Hill Road. At the base of the road are a pair of stone piers, which originally held massive timber gates. These were built in 1913-15 by landscape architect Hans Heisted, along with the road and the hut at the summit. The road is laid out to reveal gradually more impressive views of the surrounding countryside as one ascends, culminating in views of Penobscot Bay.

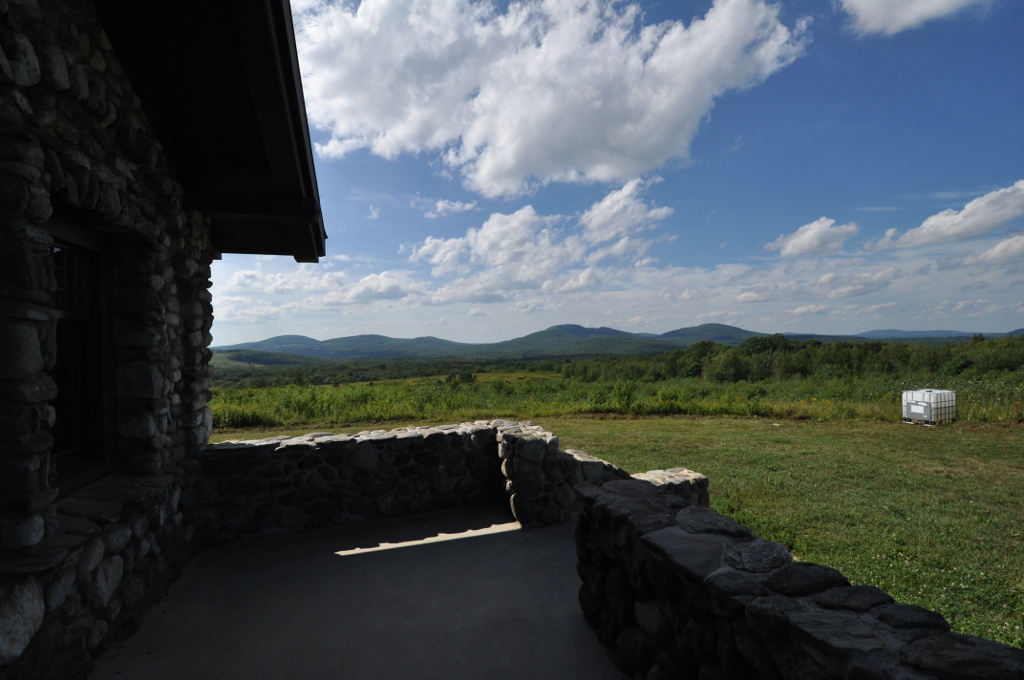
Westerly View of Pleasant, Spruce, Ragged & Bald Mountains from the summit

The hut at the top of the hill is a stone structure, with a sod roof and an east-facing veranda supported by stone piers. Its interior is divided into four rooms, one large space and three smaller ones, all with stone dividers. A wooden water tank, originally fed by a pump house, is obscured within the structure. The building has occasionally been subject to vandalism, but documentary photographs have been used to restore it to very near its as-built condition. A circular stone garden is set in front of the hut.

== History ==
The preserve's hilltop features were built in 1913-15 by Hans Heistad, a Norwegian immigrant, for the Gribbel family as a summer picnic and leisure spot. The Gribbels had started acquiring land on the hill in 1909, and eventually accumulated holdings of more than 300 acres (120 ha). It was then sold to the Cuttings who held the property, and accumulated another 290 acres, until 1986 when Grace Cutting sold the property to conservation buyer, Jane Watson (Heyl) Stetson. She, with Maine Coast Heritage Trust, created an easement. With her husband Bill, she maintained the land and returned the area that makes up the Beech Hill Preserve to an organic blueberry operation. The Beech Hill Preserve, some 295 acres (119 ha), was then bargain sold, in 2003, to the Maine Coast Heritage Trust, which transferred the easement three years later to the Coastal Mountains Land Trust. A roughly 12-acre (4.9 ha) area of the preserve was listed on the National Register in 2003.

== See also ==
- National Register of Historic Places listings in Knox County, Maine
