= Strand Theatre (Rockland, Maine) =

- U.S. National Register of Historic Places
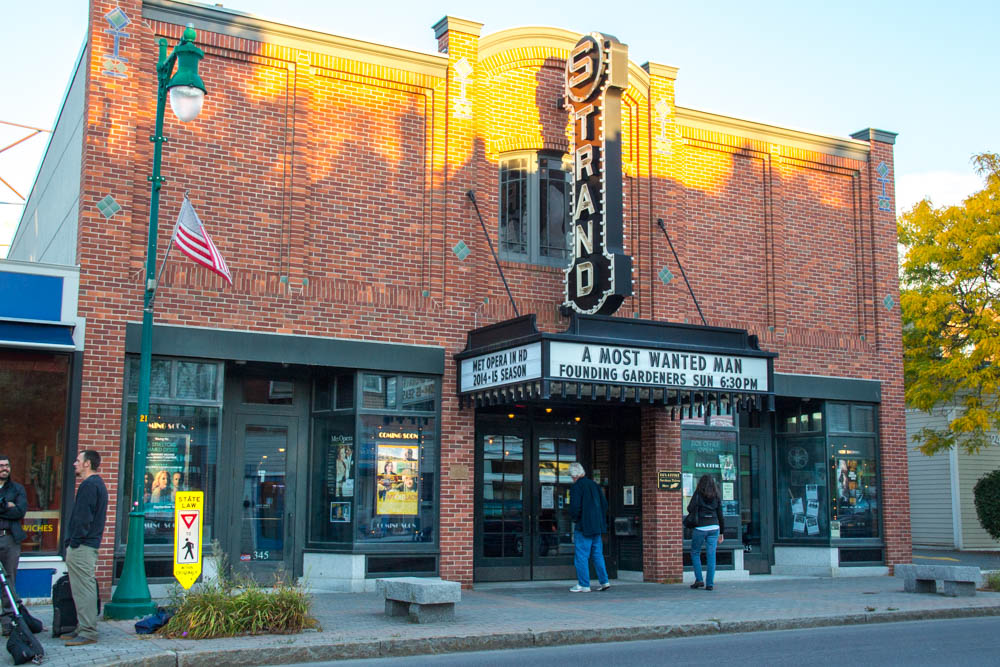

- Location within Maine Location within the United States
- Location: 345 Main St., Rockland, Maine
- Coordinates: 44°6′10″N 69°6′33″W
- Area: 0.1 acres (0.040 ha)
- Built: 1924
- Built by: Glover, W.H. Co.
- Architectural style: Modern Movement, Egyptian Revival
- NRHP reference No.: 04001284
- Added to NRHP: December 2, 2004

The Strand Theatre is a historic performing arts venue at 345 Main Street in downtown Rockland, Maine. Built in 1923 in the wake of a fire that destroyed part of the downtown, it is a rare example of Egyptian Revival architecture, and the only one of three theaters built in Rockland in that period to survive. Now owned by a non-profit, it continues to present films as well as musical and theatrical productions. It was listed on the National Register of Historic Places in 2004.

== Description and history ==
The Strand Theatre stands near the southeastern end of Rockland's downtown area, on the east side of Main Street. It is a large multisection brick building; its front section is two stories in height, and houses the main lobby and balcony. The middle section houses the main seating area, and has a roof that slopes down toward the stage. The rear section houses the stage, and is three stories in height, allowing for a large theatrical backdrop fly system. The front facade of the building is divided into three sections, articulated by brick pilasters. The outer sections, originally constructed as independent storefronts, are now part of the theater; each has a recessed entrance flanked by display windows. The theater's main entrance is at the center, consisting of recessed double doors. The wall above the outer sections has recessed panels, while that above the main entrance has a segmented-arch multi-part window, and is capped by a segmented parapet. Projecting in front of this window is the theater's marquee and sign.

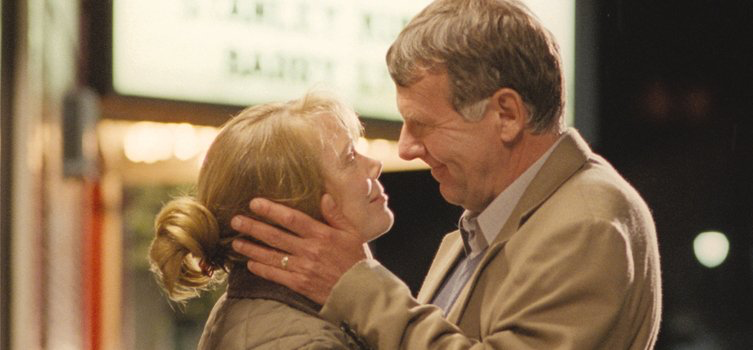
Sissy Spacek & Tom Wilkinson outside The Strand Theatre in a scene from Todd Field's In the Bedroom.

The theater was built in 1922-23, on the site of a building destroyed in a 1920 fire that swept through the southern part of Rockland's downtown. It was the first building to go up in the fire-devastated area, and its Egyptian-themed motifs include that of the phoenix, reborn from the ashes. The theater was run by the Dondis family for many years, successfully adapting to changing motion picture technology and tastes, and presenting musical and theatrical productions. It was sold by the Dondises in 2000, and has since undergone restoration of its interior and exterior. It is now owned by a local nonprofit, which continues to offer similar entertainment choices.

== See also ==
- National Register of Historic Places listings in Knox County, Maine
