= Wharf House =

Historic house in Maine, United States

- U.S. National Register of Historic Places
- Location within Maine
- Location: SE of jct. of Main and Smith Sts., North Haven, Maine
- Coordinates: 44°7′37″N 68°52′16″W
- Area: less than one acre
- Built: 1912
- Architect: Chandlet, H. Deland
- Architectural style: Shingle Style
- NRHP reference No.: 91001508
- Added to NRHP: October 16, 1991

The Wharf House is a historic house in the village of North Haven, Maine. Located on a wharf at the waterfront, it is an idiosyncratic expression of Shingle style architecture, built as a canning factory and adapted for residential use in 1912. It was listed on the National Register of Historic Places in 1991.

== Description and history ==
The Wharf House stands facing the Fox Islands Thorofare on the south side of North Haven Island, at the tip of a point just east of the island community's main dock and harbor area. It is a long rectangular wood-frame structure, built partly on land and partly on a series of granite piers projecting roughly south from the point. It is surrounded by a wooden deck, which is extended as a dock further to the south. The water-facing end of the building sports a curved porch with decorative turned posts and balustrades on the upper level, and large curved brackets below, making it resemble the poop deck of sailing galleons of the 16th and 17th centuries; this porch extends partway along the long sides. The building is clad in wooden shingles, and is topped by a gabled roof occasionally punctured by eyebrow dormers. The interior is largely finished in tongue-and-groove woodwork, with exposed beams in the ceilings.

According to local historians, the property was first developed in 1880, when Lewis MacDonald built a fish processing and canning facility. It was serving as a sail loft when it was purchased in 1897 by John Reynolds, Jr. In 1912, Reynolds had the existing building renovated (in a design attributed by the family to H. Deland Chandler) into its present form. It is one of the state's most unusual examples of an adaptive creation of a summer residence.

== See also ==
- National Register of Historic Places listings in Knox County, Maine
