= Megunticook Golf Club =

- U.S. National Register of Historic Places
- U.S. Historic district
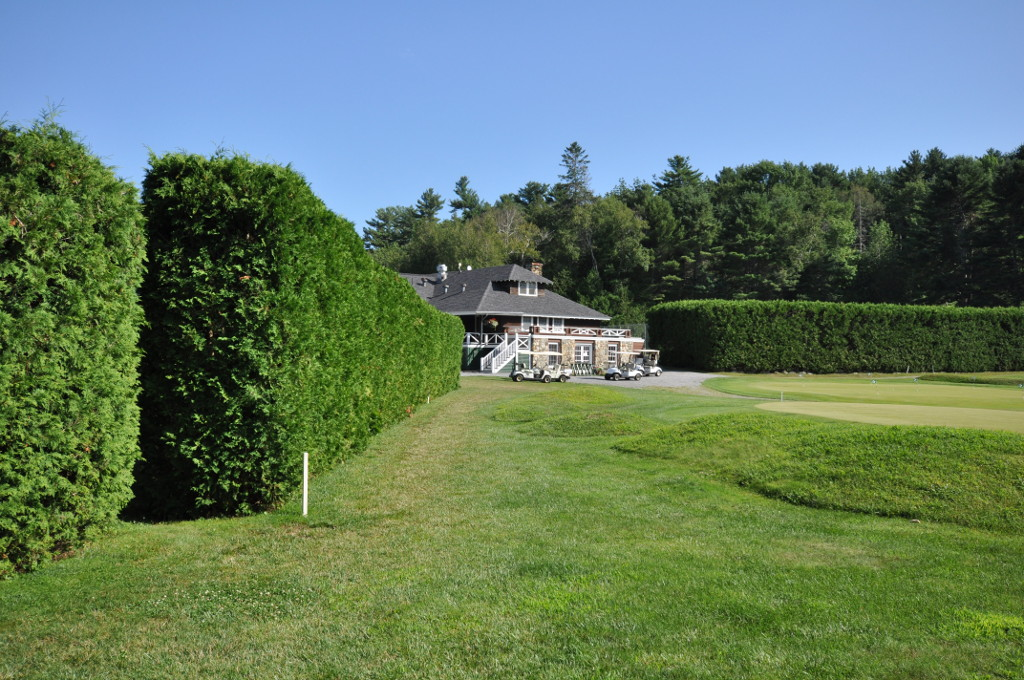

- Location within Maine Location within the United States
- Location: 212 Calderwood Ln., Rockport, Maine
- Coordinates: 44°11′3″N 69°3′49″W
- Area: 66.1 acres (26.7 ha)
- Built: 1902
- Architect: Manning, Warren et al.; Taylor, Albert
- Architectural style: Bungalow/craftsman
- NRHP reference No.: 93000636
- Added to NRHP: July 22, 1993

The Megunticook Golf Club is a private recreational club at 212 Calderwood Lane in Rockport, Maine. Its principal features are a Craftsman-style clubhouse and a nine-hole golf course, designed in 1912 by Warren H. Manning. The club was organized in 1899, and is one of the state's oldest recreational clubs, and is home to the state's oldest surviving private golf course. Its facilities were listed on the National Register of Historic Places in 1993 (misspelled "Mequnticook").

== Description and history ==
The Megunticook Golf Club is located on the east side of the Beachamp Point peninsula, which separates Rockport Harbor from Penobscot Bay. The 66-acre (27 ha) property consists of undulating terrain, with views of the harbor and bay, particularly from the clubhouse, which is set on one of its high points. The clubhouse is a roughly rectangular single-story building with a broad wraparound porch, rubblestone foundation, and stained shingled exterior. Its interior includes a reading room, main club hall, and ladies' parlor. It is located near the center of the nine-hole golf course, which extends west beyond Beachamp Street.

The club was organized in 1899 and formally incorporated in 1901. The clubhouse was designed by Boston architect Charles Brigham, and opened in 1902, along with the golf course. Early design work on the golf course was done by George Ingraham, a local landscape contractor. The course's present configuration is largely influenced by additional design work performed in 1912 by Warren Manning and in 1915 by Albert Davis Taylor, who had worked with Manning until 1914.

== See also ==
- National Register of Historic Places listings in Knox County, Maine
