= Rockland Breakwater =

- U.S. National Register of Historic Places
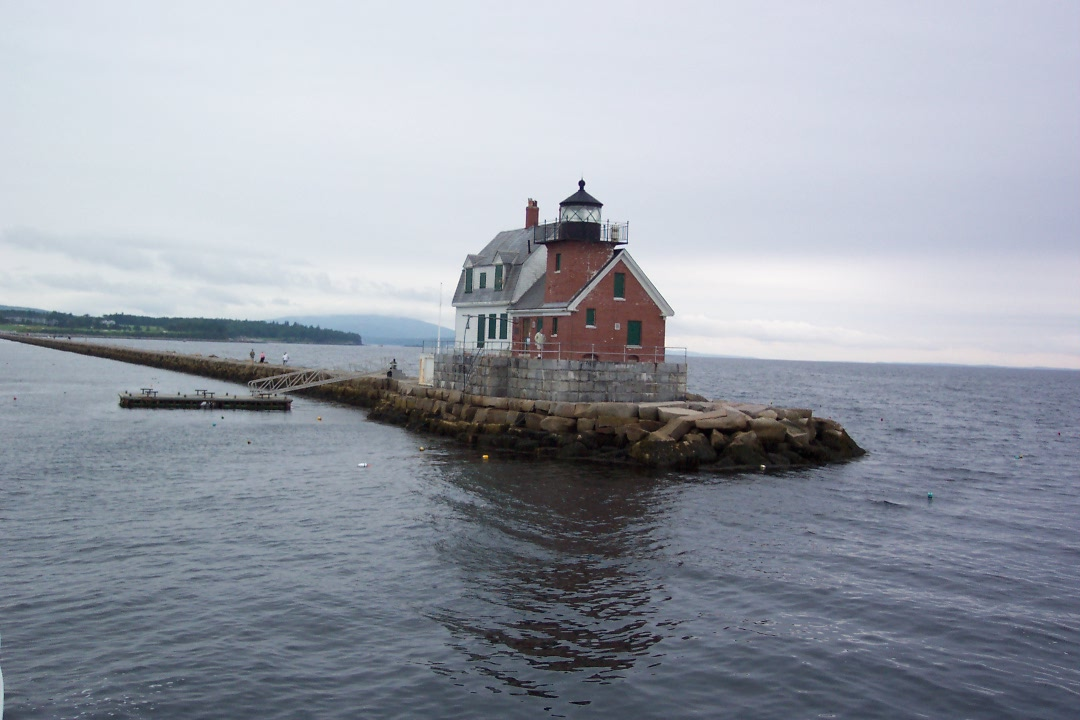
- View of the lighthouse and breakwater

- Location within Maine Location within the United States
- Location: South of Jameson Point, Rockland, Maine
- Coordinates: 44°6′14″N 69°4′41″W
- Area: 0.4 acres (0.16 ha)
- Built: 1890–1901
- Built by: US Army Corps of Engineers
- NRHP reference No.: 03000203
- Added to NRHP: April 11, 2003

The Rockland Breakwater is a breakwater sheltering the harbor of Rockland, Maine. More than 4,000 feet (1,200 m) long, it was built in the 1890s by the United States Army Corps of Engineers out of locally quarried granite to improve the harbor's ability to shelter ships from coastal storms. It was listed on the National Register of Historic Places in 2003.

== Description and history ==
The city of Rockland is located on the west side of Penobscot Bay in the Mid Coast region of Maine. Its harbor, long regarded as one of the finest east of Portland, was frequently used in the 19th century as a safe harbor during bad weather. It was less than ideally suited to this task, because its large east-facing opening would still subject ships at anchor to storms with winds from the northeast. Major storms in the 1850s highlighted the need for improved harbor protection, but federal appropriations for a project were not approved until 1880. Between 1880 and 1900 the United States Army Corps of Engineers, under a series of Congressional appropriations, built the breakwater. The lighthouse standing at its end was added in 1902.

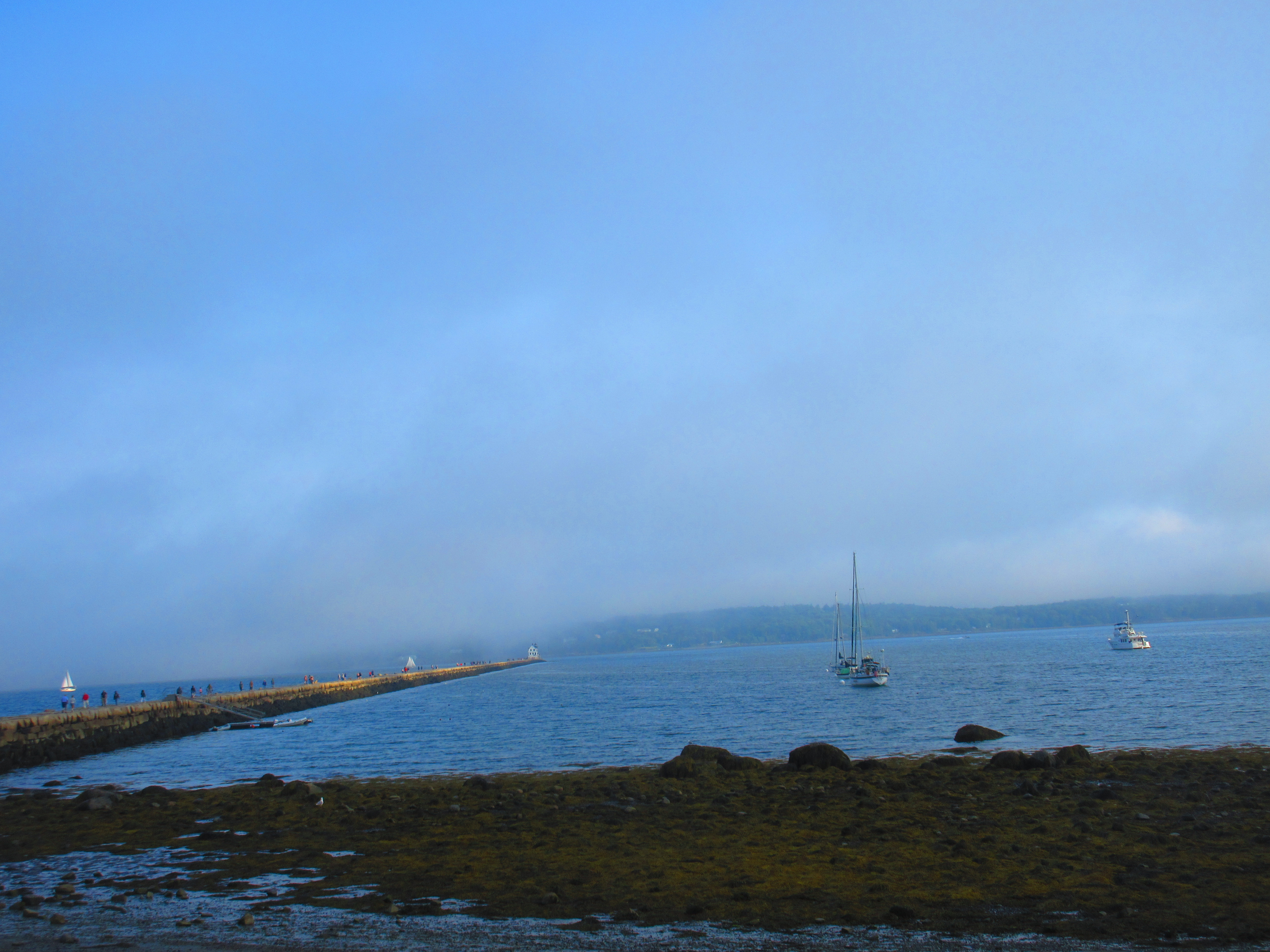
View toward the lighthouse from the shore.

The breakwater extends south from Jameson Point (marking the northern point of the harbor mouth), and has a total length of 4,364 feet (1,330 m). It is built out of locally quarried granite, and has a roughly trapezoidal cross-section, its seaward face sloping more gradually than the harbor side, in order to better take the battering of sea waves. The top of the breakwater is about 43 feet (13 m) wide, while its underwater base is an estimated 175 feet (53 m) wide. The visible top is formed out of coursed granite blocks. About 700,000 tons of rock were used in its construction. The breakwater is believed to be unique among Army Corps 19th-century breakwaters in its exclusive use of local materials.

== See also ==
- National Register of Historic Places listings in Knox County, Maine
