= Lermond Mill =

- U.S. National Register of Historic Places
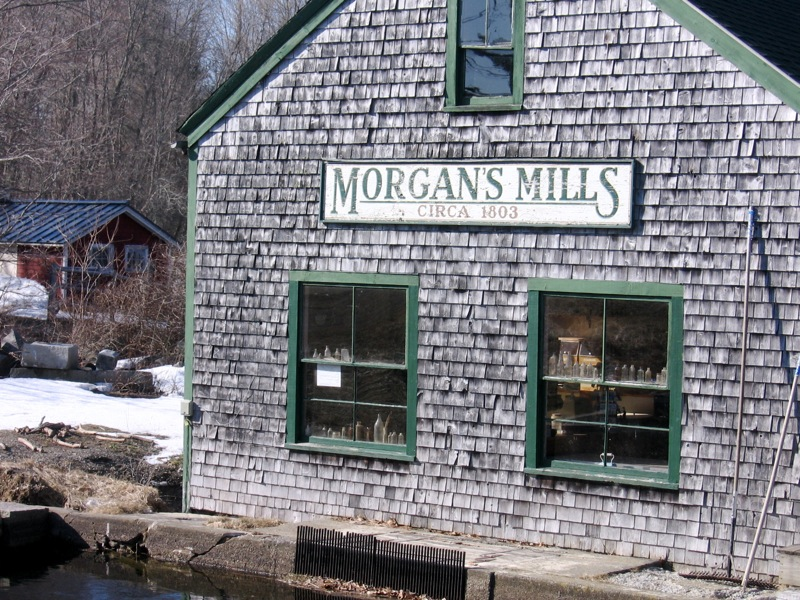

- Location within Maine Location within the United States
- Location: Payson Rd., Union, Maine
- Coordinates: 44°12′51″N 69°13′28″W
- Area: 0.3 acres (0.12 ha)
- Built: 1803
- Built by: John Lermond
- NRHP reference No.: 84000499
- Added to NRHP: December 27, 1984

The Lermond Mill, now also known as Morgan's Mill, is a historic mill complex on Payson Road in Union, Maine. With a history dating to the late 18th century, and its present buildings from the early 19th century, it is one of the oldest operational water-powered mills in the state of Maine. It was listed on the National Register of Historic Places in 1984. As of 2006, it was reported to be in use for power generation and as a grist mill.

The mill is located in the village of East Union, and is set astride Mill Stream, the outlet of Lermond Pond, on the south side of Payson Road. The mill complex consists of two vernacular wood frame buildings, with gable roofs and shingle siding, joined by a single-story shed. They are separated from the road by a mill pond lined with granite blocks.

The industrial history of the site dates to 1795, when John Lermond arrived in Union. He built the dam that created Lermond Pond, and established a water-powered pit saw mill on the site. In 1803 he built the older of the two building sections of the present mill, and began operating a grist mill. The other main building section was added in 1825, and housed a woodworking operation, in which chairs, caskets, and barrel staves were produced. In 1871 the larger building was converted to textile making, and in 1897 the complex was used as a granite stone finishing operation. In 1928 the main waterwheel was replaced by a turbine. Mill operations ended in 1972, but were restarted in 1978. The mill has since been used to produce electricity, and for the grinding of grain. It is one of the state's oldest operational water-powered mills.

== See also ==
- National Register of Historic Places listings in Knox County, Maine
