= American Boathouse =

- U.S. National Register of Historic Places
- Location within Maine Location within the United States
- Location: Atlantic Ave., Camden, Maine
- Coordinates: 44°12′40″N 69°3′48″W
- Area: 0.5 acres (0.20 ha)
- Built: 1904
- NRHP reference No.: 82000761
- Added to NRHP: February 19, 1982

The American Boathouse is a historic boathouse on Atlantic Avenue in Camden, Maine. Built in 1904, it is one of the nation's oldest recreational boathouses. It was built to house the 130-foot (40 m) yacht of Chauncey Borland, the first commodore of the Camden Yacht Club. It was listed on the National Register of Historic Places in 1982. In early 2015, it was listed for sale at $2.5 million.

== Description and history ==
The American Boathouse is located at the head of Camden's harbor area on the Megunticook River, just east of a public park and southeast of the Camden Public Library. It consists of a long rectangular wood frame structure, with a large entrance bay at its southern (harbor) end, and a hip-roofed square structure at the street end, which houses the office. The boat entrance bay is fitted with a large door, and the building's sides are lined with sash windows. It is topped by a gabled roof and clad in wooden shingles. The office structure has a street-facing doorway, with a sash window to the right.

The boathouse was built in 1904, and is possibly the oldest recreational boathouse in the state. It was built by Chauncy Borland to house his 130-foot (40 m) steam-powered yacht Maunaloa.

== See also ==
- National Register of Historic Places listings in Knox County, Maine
