= Thomas King Inscription =

- U.S. National Register of Historic Places
- Nearest city: Cushing, Maine
- Area: 0.1 acres (0.040 ha)
- Built: 1605
- Built by: King, Thomas
- NRHP reference No.: 79000152
- Added to NRHP: May 7, 1979

The Thomas King Inscription is an artifact of the early exploration of the coast of the U.S. state of Maine. It consists of the carving by Thomas King of his name and the year 1605 on a rock above the tide line in Davis Cove, an inlet on the southern coastline of Cushing, Maine. King was a boatswain on the 1605 expedition of George Weymouth, which explored the area in search of the Northwest Passage to India.

The inscription site was listed on the National Register of Historic Places in 1979.

== See also ==
- National Register of Historic Places listings in Knox County, Maine
