= Indian Island Light =

Lighthouse in Maine, US

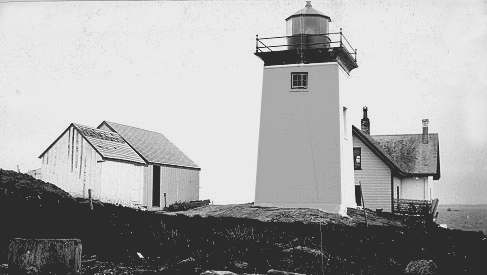
- Location: Rockport, Maine
- Coordinates: 44°9′55.55″N 69°3′39.92″W

Tower
- Constructed: 1850
- Height: 9.5 m (31 ft)
- Shape: Square Brick Tower
- Markings: White
- Heritage: National Register of Historic Places listed place

Light
- First lit: 1875 (current structure)
- Deactivated: 1934
- Lens: 4th order Fresnel lens
- Indian Island Light Station
- U.S. National Register of Historic Places
- U.S. Historic district
- Nearest city: Rockport, Maine
- Area: 4.5 acres (1.8 ha)
- Architect: US Army Corps of Engineers
- MPS: Light Stations of Maine MPS
- NRHP reference No.: 87002539
- Added to NRHP: March 23, 1988

Indian Island Light is a lighthouse on Indian Island on the eastern side of the entrance to Rockport Harbor, Maine. It was first established in 1850. The present structure was built in 1875. It was deactivated in 1934 and is now a private residence. It was listed on the National Register of Historic Places as Indian Island Light Station on March 23, 1988.

== Description and history ==
The town of Rockport is located on the western shore of Penobscot Bay in central Maine. Its harbor is sheltered by Beauchamp Point, a peninsula extending roughly southward. Indian Island is, at 4.5 acres (1.8 ha), the largest of a short chain of islands that extend south from the point. Indian Island Light is located at the southern tip of Indian Island. The station consists of a tower, keeper's house, shed, and oil house. The tower is a squat tapered square brick structure, surmounted by a square lantern house ringed by a catwalk and railing. A small workroom projects from the south side of the tower, sheltered by a gabled roof. The keeper's house is set just south of the tower; it is a 1-1/2 story structure, with the original 1850 brick block augmented by a frame addition. East of the tower is a large shed, consisting of two gable-roofed structures joined at a gable end; one is finished in board-and-batten siding, the other in shingles. Northwest of the tower stands a small brick oil house.

The light station was authorized and established in 1850, and was the principal aid to navigation marking the entrance to Rockport harbor, which was then a major shipbuilding and lime rock processing center. The light was originally mounted on top of the keeper's house, with a fourth-order Fresnel lens installed in 1856. The light was deactivated in 1859 but restarted in 1861. In 1874-75 the present tower was built, with the oil house added in 1904. The property was sold by the United States Coast Guard in 1932, with the light deactivated in 1934. The light station is in private ownership.

== See also ==
- National Register of Historic Places listings in Knox County, Maine
