= Farnsworth Homestead =

Historic house in Maine, United States

- U.S. National Register of Historic Places
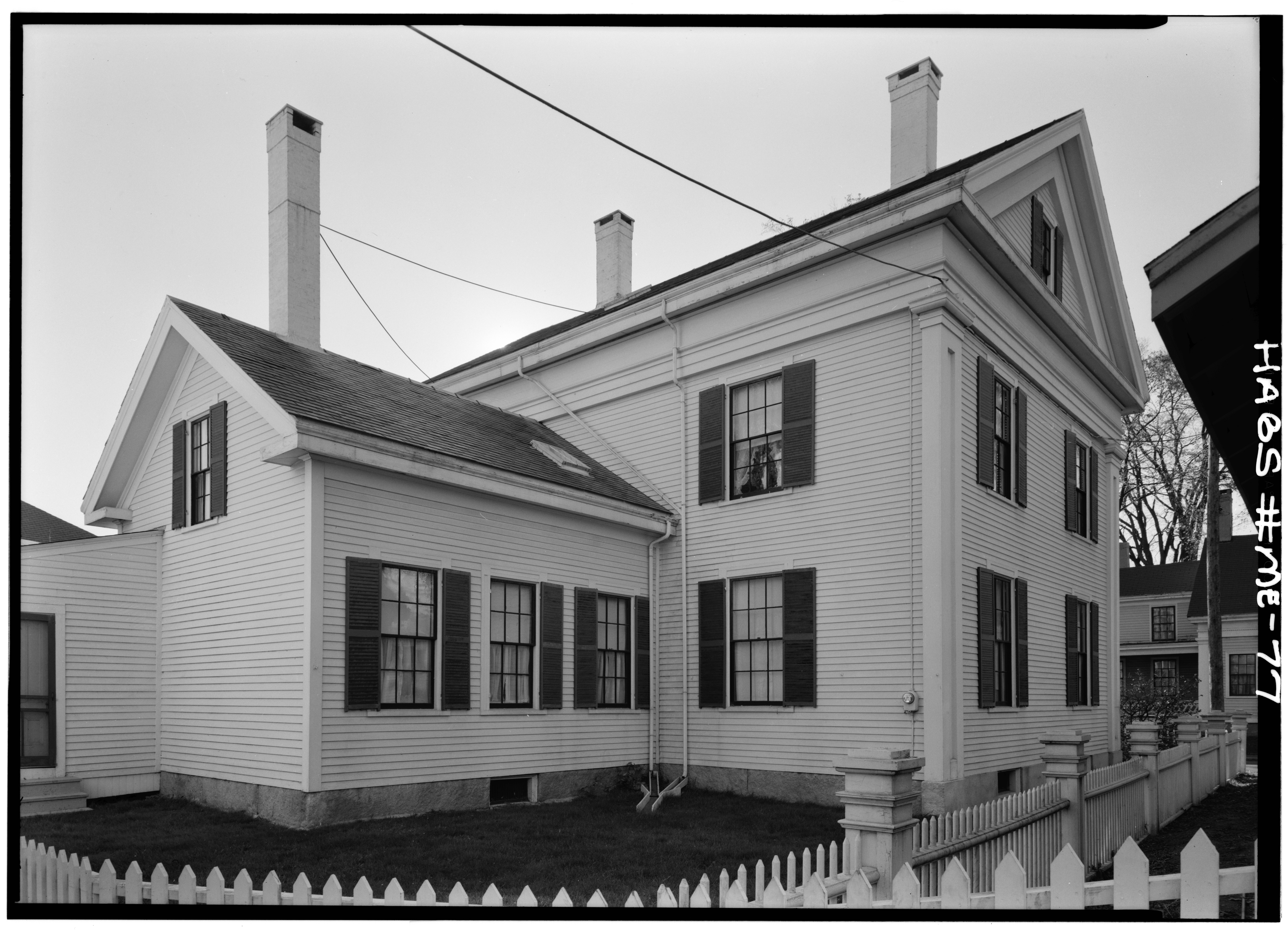
- HABS photo, 1960

- Location within Maine Location within the United States
- Location: 21 Elm St., Rockland, Maine
- Coordinates: 44°6′11″N 69°6′39″W
- Area: 1 acre (0.40 ha)
- Built: 1854
- Built by: W.H. Glover Lumber Co.
- Architectural style: Greek Revival
- NRHP reference No.: 73000241
- Added to NRHP: May 25, 1973

The Farnsworth Homestead is a historic house museum at 21 Elm Street in Rockland, Maine. Built in 1854 by William A. Farnsworth, it is an excellent late example of Greek Revival architecture, and was the home of Lucy Farnsworth, the major benefactor of the Farnsworth Art Museum, which owns the house and operates it as a museum property. The house was listed on the National Register of Historic Places in 1973.

== Description and history ==
The Farnsworth Homestead is located in downtown Rockland, on the north side of Elm Street, between Union and Main Streets. It is located directly behind the main gallery of the Farnsworth Art Museum, which faces Main Street. The homestead consists of a main house and carriage house, which are connected by a series of ells. The house is a 2 1/2-story wood-frame structure, with a gabled roof and a foundation of granite and brick. The main block is finished in flushboard siding, while the ells and carriage house are clapboarded. The corners of the main block have pilasters, which rise to an encircling entablature. The building's gables are fully pedimented. The main entrance is recessed in the center of the three-bay front facade, framed by pilasters and a corniced entablature.

The house was built in 1854 by William A. Farnsworth, a prominent local businessman involved in the area's lime rock processing industry. Despite having a large family, most of his properties were eventually inherited by his daughter Lucy, a reclusive spinster who died in 1935. According to the terms of her will, her estate went to establish the Farnsworth Art Museum, and included preservation of the family homestead as a mid-19th century house museum.

== See also ==
- National Register of Historic Places listings in Knox County, Maine
