= Union Meeting House (Appleton, Maine) =

Historic church in Maine, United States

- Union Meeting House (Appleton)
- U.S. National Register of Historic Places
- Location within Maine
- Location: 2875 Sennebec Rd., Appleton, Maine
- Coordinates: 44°17′15″N 69°14′51″W
- Area: 0.7 acres (0.28 ha)
- Built: 1848
- Built by: Carkin, William D.
- Architectural style: Greek Revival
- NRHP reference No.: 14000836
- Added to NRHP: October 8, 2014

The Union Meeting House is a historic church at 2875 Sennebec Road in Appleton, Maine. Built in 1848, it is a fine local example of Greek Revival architecture. It has served a variety of congregations, and housed the town library for a time. It is now owned by the local historical society. It was listed on the National Register of Historic Places in 2014.

== Description and history ==
The Union Meeting House stands atop a rise on the northeast side of Sennebec Road in Appleton's village center, next to the town offices and roughly opposite the public library. It is a modest single-story wood frame structure, with a gabled roof, clapboard siding, and a granite foundation. The front facade is symmetrical with a pair of entrances, each flanked by pilasters and topped by corniced entablatures. A pair of narrow and tall stained-glass windows are set in similar framing between the entrances, as are sash windows directly above them. The facade's corners are pilastered, and there is a lancet-shaped louver near the peak of the gable. A tower rises from the gabled roof, with a square first stage, a six-sided louvered belfry as a second stage, and a six-sided steeple above.

The meeting house was built in 1848 by a union of non-Baptist congregations, as a place of worship that was not shared with the Baptists, who had built a church in 1845. Construction was funded by the sale of pews, and denominations that used the building over the years included Unitarians and Quakers. It fell out of using about 1920 and was maintained until 1970 by the Appleton Memorial Association. For 28 years, the balcony housed the local public library. In 1971 the town claimed the property on a tax lien and gave it to the local historical society, which now uses it as its museum and headquarters.

== See also ==
- National Register of Historic Places listings in Knox County, Maine
