= Archaeological sites in North Haven, Maine =

- Turner Farm Site
- U.S. National Register of Historic Places
- Nearest city: North Haven, Maine
- Area: 2 acres (0.81 ha)
- MPS: Prehistoric Sites in North Haven TR (AD)
- NRHP reference No.: 76000100
- Added to NRHP: March 26, 1976

The town of North Haven, Maine is an island community located principally on North Fox Island in southern Penobscot Bay, separated from its mouth by Vinalhaven. The Fox Islands (which encompass both communities) were the subject of an intensive archaeological survey in the 1970s, in which more than 49 sites of interest were identified in North Haven. Eight of these were deemed significant enough to be listed on the National Register of Historic Places; the most significant of these, the Turner Farm Site, was a site exhibiting evidence of year-round occupation during at least three time periods in prehistory.

== Description ==
Penobscot Bay is located in the mid-coast of Maine, roughly dividing the state's coastline in two. There are two major island groups in the central portion of the bay: Islesboro to the north, and the Fox Islands (politically divided between North Haven and Vinalhaven) to the south. In the 1970s the Fox Islands were studied intensively by archaeologists of the Maine State Museum to understand habitation and subsistence patterns of its prehistoric occupants. In addition to identifying more than 130 sites in both communities, this survey work was able to establish chronologies of occupation and modes of subsistence in the area. Eight significant sites were identified, and have been listed on the National Register of Historic Places: Turner Farm, Turner Farm II, Mullen's Cove, Joe Amesbury Place, Bortz-Lewis Site, Bull Rock Site, Cabot I Site, and Crocker Site. All of these have as a major component a shell midden, each of which yielded evidence of habitation in the Late Archaic and Ceramic phases.

The Turner Farm Site was identified as the most significant of the sites located, and was subjected to extensive archaeological work. It has yielded evidence of occupation during at least three different time periods (the Moorehead, Susquehanna, and Ceramic phases) dating back to c. 5200 BCE, with different patterns of use and subsistence identified. During the Moorehead period, the site was most intensively used during the late fall and winter, with the major subsistence activity consisting of fishing, which was supplemented by hunting land-based mammals. In the Susquehanna period the occupancy period was longer, and the major food sources were land mammals such as bear, moose, and seals taken from rookeries. In the Ceramic period there was a period of year-round occupation, and food sources were diverse, a probable indication of growing human population. The site was one of the first to provide clear evidence of year-round occupation by pre-contact Native populations on the Maine coast.

== See also ==
- National Register of Historic Places listings in Knox County, Maine
