= Timothy and Jane Williams House =

Historic house in Maine, United States

- U.S. National Register of Historic Places
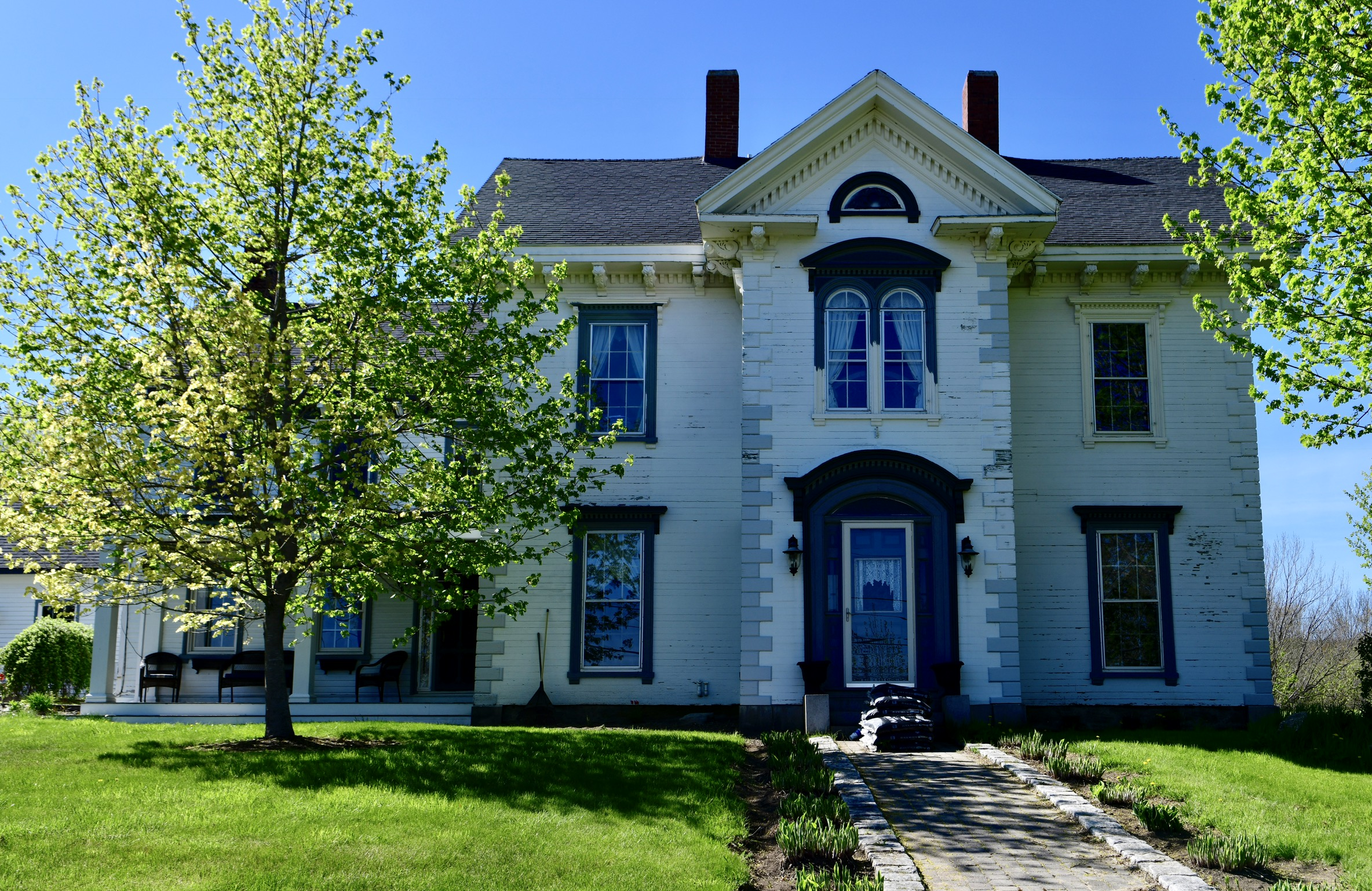

- Location within Maine
- Location: 34 Old County Rd., Rockland, Maine
- Coordinates: 44°6′9″N 69°8′34″W
- Area: 1.2 acres (0.49 ha)
- Built: 1859
- Architect: Overlock, James
- Architectural style: Italianate
- NRHP reference No.: 05001441
- Added to NRHP: December 21, 2005

The Timothy and Jane Williams House is a historic house at 34 Old County Road in Rockland, Maine. Built about 1859, it is one of the finest local examples of Italianate architecture, and was built for someone closely associated with the area's important 19th-century lime processing industry. It was listed on the National Register of Historic Places in 2005.

== Description and history ==
The Williams House stands in what is now a rural residential area of western Rockland, on the northwest side of Old County Road, formerly a through road between Thomaston and Camden, and now largely used to bypass downtown Rockland. The house stands opposite one of the Rockland area's many former lime quarries. It is a 2 1/2-story wood-frame structure, with a gabled roof and clapboarded exterior. A lower two-story ell extends to the left, also covered by a gabled roof. The building corners are quoined, and the main eaves are studded with heavy brackets and lined by dentil moulding. A two-story gabled section projects at the center of the front facade, housing the main entrance in a slight recess, flanked by sidelights and topped by an eyebrow transom window. The doorway surround matches that of the paired round-arch windows above, with a bracketed segmented-arch top. Windows are rectangular sash, with bracketed cornices and lintels.

The house was built about 1859 for Timothy and Jane Williams. Timothy Williams was a leading businessman in the period, owning lime quarries and engaging in a diverse array of other businesses. He also served as a city selectman and in the state legislature, and was an important figure in the area's business community prior to the consolidation of the lime processing industry. The family's house was designed by James Overlock, a prominent local architect.

== See also ==
- National Register of Historic Places listings in Knox County, Maine
