= The Common (Union, Maine) =

- U.S. National Register of Historic Places
- U.S. Historic district
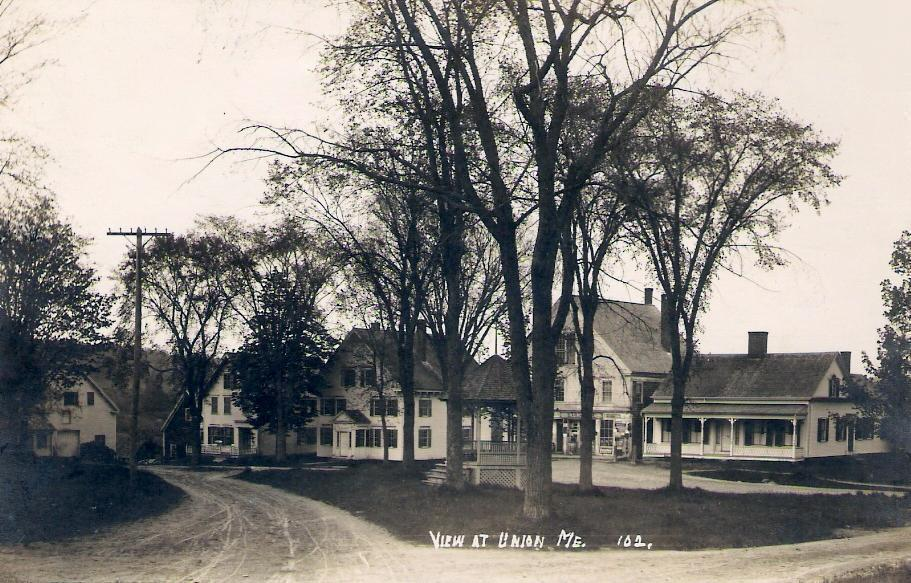
- 1915 postcard view of the common

- Location within Maine Location within the United States
- Location: Between Common & Burkett Rds., Union, Maine
- Coordinates: 44°12′41″N 69°16′30″W
- Area: 3 acres (1.2 ha)
- Built: 1790
- Architectural style: Queen Anne, Town Common
- NRHP reference No.: 07001151
- Added to NRHP: November 7, 2007

The Common is the town common of Union, Maine. Laid out about 1790 and acquired by the town in 1809, it is the oldest public town common in the state of Maine. It is the site of the town's various war and veterans memorials, and also has a bandstand. It was listed on the National Register of Historic Places in 2007.

== Description and history ==
The Common is located in the center of the main village of Union, a rural inland community of coastal Knox County. It is a roughly lozenge-shaped 3-acre (1.2 ha) parcel, bounded on the north by Burkett Road and the south by Common Road. It is roughly bisected by Town House Road (Maine State Route 235), with the eastern section further subdivided by Abbott Road and another unnamed spur road. The westernmost portion is an open grassy area, shaded by three rows of maple trees, which are replacements of elm trees planted in the 19th century. Facing Town House Road is the 18-foot (5.5 m) granite American Civil War memorial, placed in 1888 by the local chapter of the Grand Army of the Republic. At the southeast corner of that section is a small cement watering trough, and a wooden 1940s map of the area.

The westernmost eastern section is mostly open, with maple trees around the fringe, and an octagonal Queen Anne style bandstand in the southern half, built in 1895. The central eastern section houses the town's World War II memorial, and a memorial to the town's peacetime veterans. The easternmost section is a small triangular stub of land, devoid of significant ornament.

The town of Union was settled in the 1770s and incorporated in 1786. The first mention that the town has a common is in town documents of 1790, although it is unclear if the present common is the property mentioned. The land that makes up the present common had apparently been laid out by 1801, and was purchased from David Gillmor in 1809 for $100, then a significant sum of money. The common is distinctive among Maine's town commons as the oldest known to have been acquired as a common, and for retaining its original configuration (including the extant road cuts through it) from a very early date.

== See also ==
- National Register of Historic Places listings in Knox County, Maine
