= Benjamin Burton Garrison Site =

Archaeological site in Cushing, Maine, US

- U.S. National Register of Historic Places
- Nearest city: Cushing, Maine
- Area: 1 acre (0.40 ha)
- Built: 1753
- Built by: Benjamin Burton
- NRHP reference No.: 83000461
- Added to NRHP: September 9, 1983

The Benjamin Burton Garrison Site is a historic archaeological site in Cushing, Maine. It is the location of a palisaded stone blockhouse built in 1753 by Benjamin Burton, an Irish immigrant who came to what was then a frontier area in 1751. Burton's blockhouse was one of several colonial defensive positions on the St. George River, occupying a position between present-day Thomaston, and Pleasant Point at the mouth of the river. The blockhouse was attacked by Native Americans in 1756, during the French and Indian War.

The site of Burton's blockhouse was listed on the National Register of Historic Places in 1983 for its archaeological significance.

== See also ==
- National Register of Historic Places listings in Knox County, Maine
