= Old Town House (Parsonsfield, Maine) =

- U.S. National Register of Historic Places
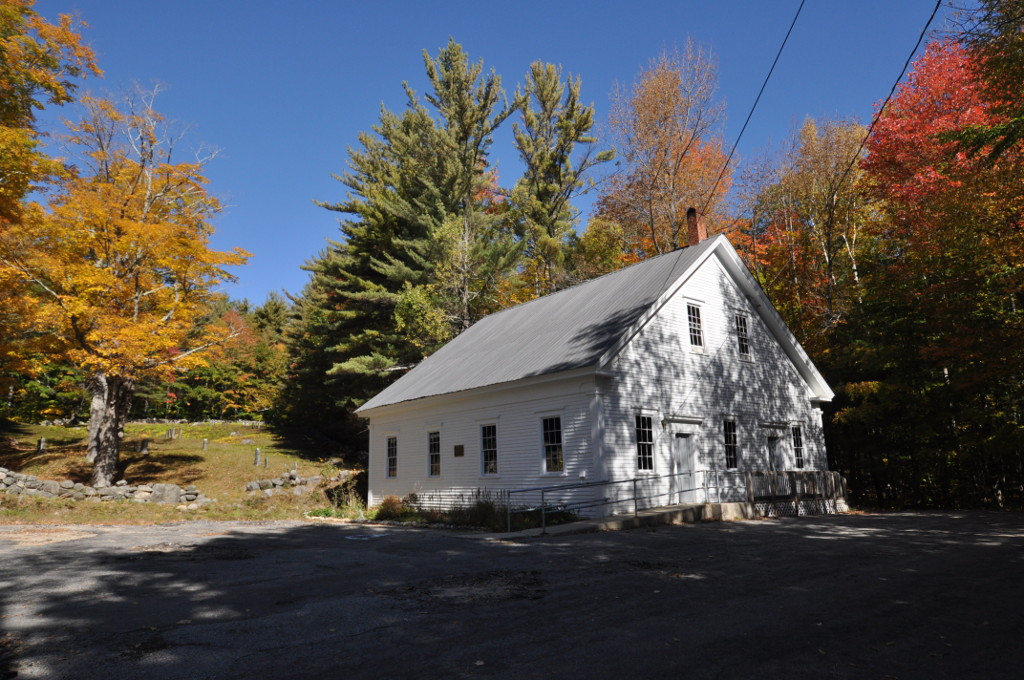

- Location within Maine Location within the United States
- Location: Merrill Hill Rd., N of jct. with Middle Rd., Parsonsfield, Maine
- Coordinates: 43°43′42″N 70°55′47″W
- Area: 0.3 acres (0.12 ha)
- Built: 1833
- Architect: Morton, William. Jr.
- Architectural style: Greek Revival
- NRHP reference No.: 02000785
- Added to NRHP: July 15, 2002

The Old Town House is the town hall of Parsonsfield, Maine. Located on Merrill Hill Road, the 1834 Greek Revival building has served as the town's main civic building for more than 150 years. It was listed on the National Register of Historic Places in 2002.

== Description and history ==
The Old Town House is located on the east side of Merrill Hill Road, at the northern fringe of the rural village center of Parsonsfield. It is a 1-1/2 story wood frame structure, with a front-facing gable roof, clapboard siding, and a granite foundation. Oriented facing south (with the gable ridge parallel to the road), its front facade is symmetrical, with a pair of entrances, each flanked by pilasters and topped by an entablature. The building corners are also pilastered. There are three sash windows set around the entrances on the ground floor, and two more in the attic level. The interior, originally a single large space, has retained original wide pine wainscoting and plaster walls. Portions of the interior have been partitioned off to house town offices, and part of the attic level has also been finished for that purpose.

When Parsonsfield was first incorporated in 1771, town meetings were held in local residences. In 1794 the town built a meeting house on the west side of Merrill Hill Road, which was used for both civic and religious purposes. The present building was erected after that building was made over exclusively for church use. The building was used for town meetings until 1985, but still houses town offices and is used as a polling station.

== See also ==
- National Register of Historic Places listings in York County, Maine
