= Sail Loft (Tenants Harbor, Maine) =

- U.S. National Register of Historic Places
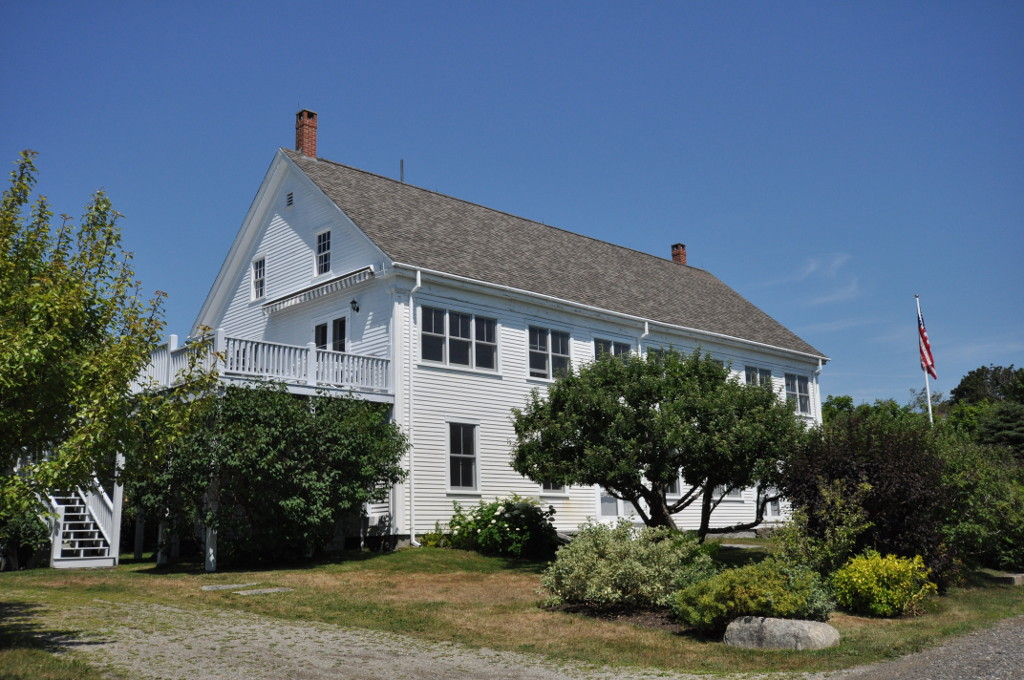

- Location within Maine Location within the United States
- Location: Off ME 131, Tenants Harbor, Maine
- Coordinates: 43°57′55″N 69°12′36″W
- Area: 1 acre (0.40 ha)
- Built: 1860
- Built by: Long, Deacon Robert
- Architectural style: Greek Revival
- NRHP reference No.: 77000076
- Added to NRHP: October 28, 1977

The Sail Loft is a historic commercial building on Front Street in the Tenants Harbor village of St. George, Maine. Built in 1860, it is one of the only surviving buildings from the village's 19th-century heyday as a shipbuilding center. It was listed on the National Register of Historic Places in 1977.

== Description and history ==
The Sail Loft is located in the village of Tenants Harbor, on the north side of Front Street and south of Maine State Route 131 (from which it is separated by an athletic field). It is a rectangular 2 1/2-story wood-frame building, with a gabled roof, clapboard siding, and granite foundation. It has a few touches of Greek Revival styling, including corner pilasters and corner returns at the gables. Fenestration is somewhat regular, with seven bays containing sash windows and doors on the long sides, and two bays on the ends. One end has a second-story materials entrance, and there are windows at the attic level in the gables.

The village of Tenants Harbor was a significant shipbuilding center in St. George between about 1820 and 1870, when more than 70 coasting schooners were built in local shipyards. The Sail Loft was built in 1860 by Robert Long, and originally housed a ship's chandlery on the ground floor, a sail loft on the second, and a woodworking shop in the attic. Long's son was engaged in the shipbuilding trade, building seven vessels on the waterfront just south of the building. The building's ground floor is still fitted with original store fixtures.

== See also ==
- National Register of Historic Places listings in Knox County, Maine
