= Rankin Block =

- U.S. National Register of Historic Places
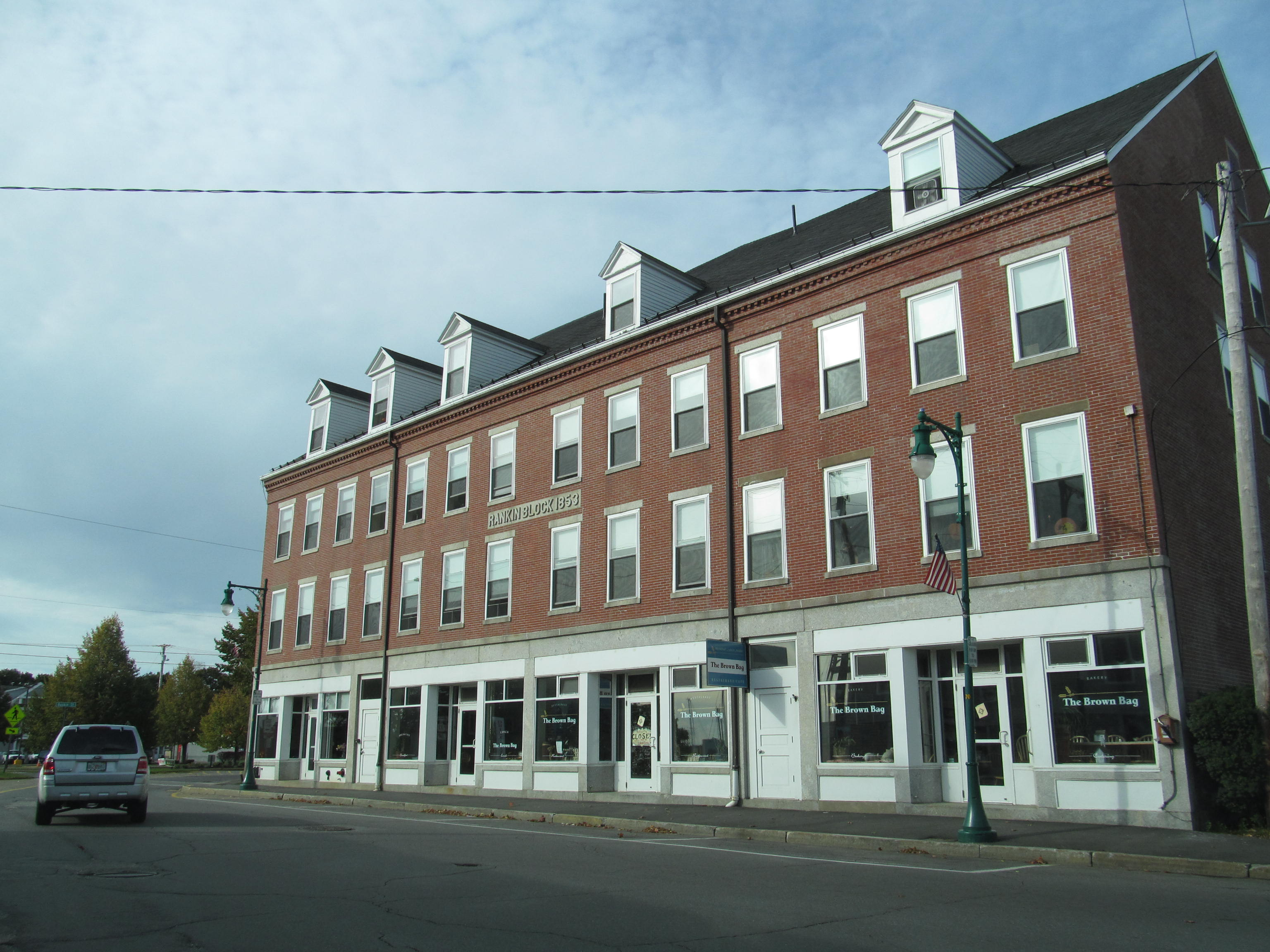

- Location within Maine Location within the United States
- Location: 600-610 Main St., Rockland, Maine
- Coordinates: 44°6′32″N 69°6′38″W
- Area: 1 acre (0.40 ha)
- Built: 1853
- Architectural style: Greek Revival
- NRHP reference No.: 78000184
- Added to NRHP: November 7, 1978

The Rankin Block is a historic commercial building at 600–610 Main Street in Rockland, Maine. Built in 1853, it is a fine example of a late Greek Revival commercial block. It was listed on the National Register of Historic Places in 1978. It currently houses a senior living facility.

== Description and history ==
The Rankin Block is located on the northern edge of Rockland's central downtown area, at the northwest corner of Main and Rankin Streets (both signed United States Route 1). The original portion of the building is a three-story masonry structure, built out of brick with granite trim. It has a gabled roof, which is pierced by four irregularly spaced gabled dormers. The ground floor has four retail storefronts, articulated by granite piers and topped by a granite stringcourse, with two building entrances set symmetrically outside the center two storefronts. Windows on the upper levels are sash, set in rectangular openings with granite lintels and sills. There is a modest brickwork cornice, laid to resemble dentil moulding, below the roofline.

The block was built in 1853 by Samuel Rankin, a descendant of one of the area's first European settlers. Its location was near the center of the city's shipbuilding industries, and replaced an earlier commercial building destroyed by fire. Its early tenants included a ship chandlery, shipping offices, and a sail loft on the top floor. The building has been converted for residential use.

== See also ==
- National Register of Historic Places listings in Knox County, Maine
