= National Register of Historic Places listings in Knox County, Maine =

Location of Knox County in Maine.

This is a list of the National Register of Historic Places listings in Knox County, Maine.

This is intended to be a complete list of the properties and districts on the National Register of Historic Places in Knox County, Maine, United States. Latitude and longitude coordinates are provided for many National Register properties and districts; these locations may be seen together in a map.

There are 97 properties and districts listed on the National Register in the county; 10 of the properties are National Historic Landmarks. One property was once listed, but has since been removed.

This National Park Service list is complete through NPS recent listings posted May 1, 2026.

Contents: Counties and municipalities in Maine
Androscoggin - Aroostook - Cumberland (City of Portland) - Franklin - Hancock - Kennebec - Knox - Lincoln - Oxford - Penobscot - Piscataquis - Sagadahoc - Somerset - Waldo - Washington - York

== Current listings ==
	Name on the Register	Image	Date listed	Location	City or town	Description
1	Ebenezer Alden House	Ebenezer Alden House	April 28, 1975 (#75000100)	Off State Route 131; 44°12′44″N 69°16′03″W	Union	
2	Allen's Island		December 15, 1983 (#83003646)	In Muscongus Bay; 43°52′16″N 69°18′42″W	St. George	
3	American Boathouse		February 19, 1982 (#82000761)	Atlantic Ave. 44°12′40″N 69°03′48″W	Camden	
4	American Eagle (schooner)	American Eagle (schooner)	December 4, 1991 (#91002064)	Rockland Harbor; 44°06′32″N 69°06′32″W	Rockland	National Historic Landmark
5	Joe Amesbury Place		March 11, 1982 (#82000760)	Address Restricted	North Haven	
6	Beechnut Hut Historic District	Beechnut Hut Historic District	July 10, 2003 (#03000617)	316 Beech Hill Rd. 44°10′07″N 69°06′15″W	Rockport	
7	Blackjack (friendship sloop)		October 5, 2020 (#100005650)	Rockland Harbor at 75 Mechanic St. 44°05′36″N 69°06′14″W	Rockland	
8	Bortz-Lewis Site		March 11, 1982 (#82000762)	Address Restricted	North Haven	
9	Browns Head Light Station	Browns Head Light Station	January 27, 1983 (#83000460)	Browns Head; 44°06′42″N 68°54′35″W	Vinalhaven	
10	Bull Rock		March 11, 1982 (#82000763)	Address Restricted	North Haven	
11	Benjamin Burton Garrison Site		September 9, 1983 (#83000461)	Address Restricted	Cushing	
12	Cabot I Site		March 11, 1982 (#82000764)	Address Restricted	North Haven	
13	Camden Great Fire Historic District	Camden Great Fire Historic District	January 9, 2007 (#06001221)	Elm and Main Sts. 44°12′35″N 69°03′57″W	Camden	
14	Camden Opera House Block	Camden Opera House Block	December 29, 1986 (#86003539)	Off U.S. Route 1; 44°12′32″N 69°04′01″W	Camden	
15	Camden Amphitheater and Public Library	Camden Amphitheater and Public Library	February 27, 2013 (#13000285)	55 Main St. 44°12′41″N 69°03′51″W	Camden	
16	Camden Yacht Club	Camden Yacht Club	January 11, 1980 (#80000378)	Bay View St. 44°12′26″N 69°03′43″W	Camden	
17	Chestnut Street Historic District	Chestnut Street Historic District	March 22, 1991 (#91000325)	Chestnut St. from Elm to Beacon Ave., including parts of Penobscot, Pleasant and Wood Sts., and Dillingham Pt. 44°12′13″N 69°03′43″W	Camden	
18	The Common	The Common	November 7, 2007 (#07001151)	Between Common and Burkett Rds. 44°12′41″N 69°16′30″W	Union	
19	Conway House	Conway House	December 23, 1969 (#69000010)	Conway Rd. 44°12′01″N 69°04′52″W	Camden	
20	Crocker Site		March 11, 1982 (#82000765)	Address Restricted	North Haven	
21	Curtis Island Light	Curtis Island Light	May 17, 1973 (#73000263)	3.8 miles from Camden Harbor in Penobscot Bay; 44°12′07″N 69°03′03″W	Camden	
22	Dunn & Elliot Sail Loft		March 13, 2020 (#100005096)	54 Water St. 44°04′26″N 69°11′08″W	Thomaston	
23	Farnsworth Homestead	Farnsworth Homestead	May 25, 1973 (#73000241)	21 Elm St. 44°06′11″N 69°06′39″W	Rockland	
24	Finnish Congregational Church and Parsonage	Finnish Congregational Church and Parsonage	June 24, 1994 (#94000639)	Eastern side of State Route 131, 0.9 miles south of its junction with U.S. Route 1; 44°04′18″N 69°09′43″W	South Thomaston	
25	Gaunt Neck Site Complex		December 28, 2005 (#05001467)	Address Restricted; 43°58′59″N 69°18′20″W	Cushing	
26	Georges River Canal	Georges River Canal	March 5, 1970 (#70000048)	Upper Falls of the Georges River in Warren to the Union town line, extending to Quantabacook Pond in Searsmont; 44°15′N 69°15′W	Appleton, Union, and Warren	
27	Goose Rocks Light Station	Goose Rocks Light Station	January 21, 1988 (#87002267)	East Entrance to the Fox Islands Thorofare; 44°08′07″N 68°49′52″W	North Haven	
28	Grace Bailey (two-masted schooner)	Grace Bailey (two-masted schooner)	October 1, 1990 (#90001466)	Camden Harbor; 44°12′36″N 69°03′50″W	Camden	National Historic Landmark
29	Gooden Grant House		December 18, 2013 (#13000926)	1 Head Harbor; 44°01′27″N 68°37′07″W	Isle au Haut	
30	Gushee Family House	Gushee Family House	October 8, 1998 (#98001235)	2868 Sennebec Rd. 44°17′13″N 69°14′54″W	Appleton	
31	Herald Building		December 24, 2020 (#100005940)	10 Bay View St. 44°12′34″N 69°03′51″W	Camden	
32	Heron Neck Light Station	Heron Neck Light Station	January 21, 1988 (#87002266)	Heron Neck on Greens Island; 44°01′31″N 68°51′45″W	Vinalhaven	
33	High Street Historic District	High Street Historic District	January 5, 1989 (#88001843)	Roughly High St. between Main St. and Sherman Point Rd.; also the junction of Main St. and Atlantic Ave. 44°12′58″N 69°03′40″W	Camden	Main and Atlantic intersection represents a boundary increase September 24, 1999
34	Indian Island Light Station	Indian Island Light Station	March 23, 1988 (#87002539)	Indian Island in Rockport Harbor; 44°09′55″N 69°03′42″W	Rockport	
35	Isaac H. Evans (schooner)	Isaac H. Evans (schooner)	December 4, 1991 (#91002061)	Rockland Harbor; 44°06′32″N 69°06′32″W	Rockland	National Historic Landmark
36	Isle Au Haut Light Station	Isle Au Haut Light Station	January 21, 1988 (#87002265)	Robinson Point; 44°03′53″N 68°39′07″W	Isle Au Haut	
37	J. & E. Riggin (schooner)	J. & E. Riggin (schooner)	December 4, 1991 (#91002062)	Rockland Harbor; 44°06′26″N 69°06′23″W	Rockland	National Historic Landmark
38	Thomas King Inscription		May 7, 1979 (#79000152)	Address Restricted	Cushing	
39	Knox County Courthouse	Knox County Courthouse	April 18, 1977 (#77000075)	62 Union St. 44°06′14″N 69°06′43″W	Rockland	
40	Land's End Historic District	Land's End Historic District	September 8, 2011 (#11000633)	Marshall Point & Cottage Rds., Lentine & Land's End Lns. 43°55′16″N 69°15′19″W	Saint George	
41	Lermond Mill	Lermond Mill	December 27, 1984 (#84000499)	Payson Rd. 44°12′51″N 69°13′28″W	Union	
42	Lewis R. French (schooner)	Lewis R. French (schooner)	December 4, 1991 (#82005263)	Camden Harbor; 44°12′37″N 69°03′46″W	Camden	National Historic Landmark
43	Main Street Historic District	Main Street Historic District	June 7, 1978 (#78000182)	Main St. from Limerock to Winter Sts.; also 428-497 Main St. 44°06′14″N 69°06′34″W	Rockland	Second set of addresses represents a boundary increase, listed January 4, 2012
44	Marshall Point Light Station	Marshall Point Light Station	March 23, 1988 (#87002262)	Marshall Point in Port Clyde Harbor; 43°55′02″N 69°15′42″W	Port Clyde	
45	Matinicus Rock Light Station	Matinicus Rock Light Station	March 14, 1988 (#88000149)	Matinicus Rock; 43°47′06″N 68°51′16″W	Matinicus Isle	
46	Joseph and Hannah Maxcy Homestead	Joseph and Hannah Maxcy Homestead	July 28, 2004 (#04000743)	630 S. Union Rd. 44°11′47″N 69°15′50″W	Union	
47	Megunticook Golf Club	Megunticook Golf Club	July 22, 1993 (#93000636)	212 Calderwood Ln. 44°11′03″N 69°03′49″W	Rockport	Misspelled "Mequnticook" in the National Register listing.
48	Mercantile (schooner)	Mercantile (schooner)	December 4, 1991 (#82005265)	Camden Harbor; 44°12′38″N 69°03′46″W	Camden	
49	Miller's Garage	Miller's Garage	February 21, 2023 (#100008495)	25 Rankin St. 44°06′34″N 69°06′42″W	Rockland	
50	Mt. Battie Tower	Mt. Battie Tower	December 31, 2018 (#100003259)	At summit loop of Mt. Battie Rd. 44°13′23″N 69°04′08″W	Camden	
51	Mosquito Island House	Mosquito Island House	September 29, 1983 (#83000462)	South of St. George on Mosquito Island; 43°55′21″N 69°13′22″W	St. George	
52	Mullen's Cove		March 30, 1984 (#84001382)	Address Restricted	North Haven	
53	Murch Family House		March 25, 1993 (#93000205)	Southeastern side of Calderwood Neck, 2 miles northeast of North Haven Rd. 44°06′00″N 68°49′05″W	Vinalhaven	
54	Norumbega	Norumbega	July 12, 1974 (#74000174)	High St. 44°13′04″N 69°03′26″W	Camden	
55	Norumbega Carriage House		February 19, 1982 (#82000766)	High St. 44°13′00″N 69°03′25″W	Camden	
56	Olson House	Olson House	August 31, 1995 (#93001114)	Eastern side of Hathorn Point Rd. 43°58′54″N 69°16′09″W	South Cushing vicinity	Andrew Wyeth spent 30 summers at the house and is buried on the grounds. National Historic Landmark designation June 23, 2011.
57	Owls Head Light Station	Owls Head Light Station	January 18, 1978 (#78000183)	Northeast of Owls Head on W. Penobscot Bay; 44°05′30″N 69°02′41″W	Owls Head	
58	Pleasant River Grange No. 492		October 8, 1999 (#99001190)	Round Island Rd., 0.15 miles east of its junction with N. Haven Rd. 44°04′33″N 68°50′20″W	Vinalhaven	
59	Rankin Block	Rankin Block	November 7, 1978 (#78000184)	600-610 Main St. 44°06′32″N 69°06′38″W	Rockland	
60	Rockland Breakwater	Rockland Breakwater	April 11, 2003 (#03000203)	South of Jameson Point; 44°06′14″N 69°04′41″W	Rockland	
61	Rockland Breakwater Lighthouse	Rockland Breakwater Lighthouse	March 20, 1981 (#81000067)	Rockland Harbor; 44°06′14″N 69°04′40″W	Rockland	
62	Rockland Public Library	Rockland Public Library	July 10, 1979 (#79000153)	Union St. 44°06′19″N 69°06′45″W	Rockland	
63	Rockland Railroad Station	Rockland Railroad Station	February 7, 1978 (#78000327)	Union St. 44°06′03″N 69°06′41″W	Rockland	
64	Rockland Residential Historic District	Rockland Residential Historic District	April 15, 1987 (#86003513)	Roughly bounded by Granite, Union, Masonic, Broad, Limerock, and Broadway Sts. 44°06′18″N 69°06′53″W	Rockland	
65	Rockland Turntable and Engine House	Rockland Turntable and Engine House	June 24, 1993 (#90001953)	Park St. west of the Rockland railroad station 44°06′04″N 69°07′23″W	Rockland	
66	Rockport Historic District	Rockport Historic District	May 28, 1976 (#76000099)	Irregular pattern along Pascal Ave. from Russell, Union, and Winter Sts. on the north to School St. on the south 44°11′08″N 69°04′28″W	Rockport	
67	Rockport Historic Kiln Area	Rockport Historic Kiln Area	January 26, 1970 (#70000090)	On the western side of the mouth of the Goose River at its confluence with Rockport Harbor; 44°11′11″N 69°04′27″W	Rockport	
68	Saddleback Ledge Light Station	Saddleback Ledge Light Station	March 14, 1988 (#88000158)	Saddleback Ledge at Isle Au Haut Bay; 44°00′51″N 68°43′36″W	Vinalhaven	
69	Sail Loft	Sail Loft	October 28, 1977 (#77000076)	Off State Route 131; 43°57′55″N 69°12′36″W	Tenants Harbor	
70	Security Trust Building	Security Trust Building	January 20, 1978 (#78000185)	Elm and Main Sts. 44°06′13″N 69°06′35″W	Rockland	
71	Singhi Double House		March 28, 2019 (#100003589)	198-200 Broadway; 44°06′17″N 69°07′04″W	Rockland	Apparently incorrectly listed in Rockport.
72	Spite House	Spite House	August 13, 1974 (#74000175)	Deadman's Point; 44°10′31″N 69°03′18″W	Rockport	
73	Star of Hope Lodge		February 19, 1982 (#82000767)	Maine St. 44°02′52″N 68°49′59″W	Vinalhaven	
74	Stephen Taber (schooner)	Stephen Taber (schooner)	July 30, 1984 (#84001386)	Rockland Harbor; 44°06′20″N 69°06′27″W	Rockland	National Historic Landmark
75	Strand Theatre	Strand Theatre	December 2, 2004 (#04001284)	345 Main St. 44°06′10″N 69°06′33″W	Rockland	
76	Surprise (schooner)	Surprise (schooner)	June 14, 1991 (#91000771)	Camden Harbor; 44°12′38″N 69°03′48″W	Camden	
77	Tenants Harbor Light Station	Tenants Harbor Light Station	November 20, 1987 (#87002026)	Southern Island; 43°57′43″N 69°11′18″W	Tenants Harbor	
78	Thomaston Historic District	Thomaston Historic District	May 2, 1974 (#74000176)	Runs along US 1 between Wadsworth St. and State Route 131; 44°04′38″N 69°10′54″W	Thomaston	
79	George Thorndike House	George Thorndike House	January 11, 1983 (#83000463)	State Route 73; 44°03′21″N 69°07′23″W	South Thomaston	
80	Tillson Farm Barn	Tillson Farm Barn	December 18, 1990 (#90001902)	Warrenton Rd. southeast of its junction with Commercial St. 44°07′49″N 69°05′23″W	Glen Cove	
81	Gen. Davis Tillson House	Gen. Davis Tillson House	January 11, 1983 (#83000464)	157 Talbot Ave. 44°06′34″N 69°07′19″W	Rockland	
82	Tolman Cemetery	Tolman Cemetery	October 12, 2017 (#100001741)	39 Lake Ave. 44°07′33″N 69°07′14″W	Rockland	
83	Turner Farm II		March 11, 1982 (#82000768)	Address Restricted	North Haven	
84	Turner Farm Site		March 26, 1976 (#76000100)	Address Restricted	North Haven	
85	Union Church of Vinalhaven		July 19, 1984 (#84001388)	E. Main St. 44°02′54″N 68°49′52″W	Vinalhaven	
86	Union Meeting House (Appleton)		October 8, 2014 (#14000836)	2875 Sennebec Rd. 44°17′15″N 69°14′51″W	Appleton	
87	Union Town House (Former)	Union Town House (Former)	December 31, 2001 (#01001419)	128 Town House Rd. 44°12′47″N 69°16′30″W	Union	
88	US Post Office-Camden Main	US Post Office-Camden Main	September 25, 1986 (#86002960)	Chestnut St. 44°12′31″N 69°03′53″W	Camden	
89	Victory Chimes (Schooner)	Victory Chimes (Schooner)	June 24, 1996 (#93000637)	North End Shipyard, Rockland Harbor; 44°06′41″N 69°06′14″W	Rockland	National Historic Landmark
90	The Vinalhaven Galamander		July 1, 1970 (#70000049)	Bandstand Park; 44°02′53″N 68°49′53″W	Vinalhaven	
91	Vinalhaven Public Library		January 5, 1989 (#88003014)	Carver St. 44°02′55″N 68°49′55″W	Vinalhaven	
92	Moses Webster House	Moses Webster House	April 1, 1998 (#98000309)	Atlantic Ave., 0.05 miles east of the junction of Main St. and Atlantic Ave. 44°02′51″N 68°49′53″W	Vinalhaven	
93	Wharf House		October 16, 1991 (#91001508)	Southeast of the junction of Main and Smith Sts. 44°07′37″N 68°52′16″W	North Haven	
94	Whitehead Lifesaving Station		October 12, 1988 (#88001839)	Southern side of Whitehead Island; 43°58′43″N 69°07′57″W	Sprucehead	
95	Whitehead Light Station	Whitehead Light Station	March 14, 1988 (#88000154)	Eastern side of Whitehead Island; 43°58′47″N 69°07′30″W	Tenants Harbor	
96	Whitney Farm	Whitney Farm	March 17, 2015 (#15000087)	215 Whitney Rd. 44°19′44″N 69°13′50″W	Appleton	Extends into Searsmont in Waldo County
97	Timothy and Jane Williams House	Timothy and Jane Williams House	December 21, 2005 (#05001441)	34 Old County Rd. 44°06′09″N 69°08′34″W	Rockland	

== Former and moved listings ==
	Name on the Register	Image	Date listed	Date removed	Location	City or town	Description
1	Knott Crockett House		October 14, 1993 (#93001112)	July 14, 2015	750 Main St. 44°06′43″N 69°06′26″W	Rockland	
2	Timberwind (Schooner)	Timberwind (Schooner)	March 26, 1992 (#92000274)	–	Rockport Harbor; 44°11′08″N 69°04′26″W	Rockport	Moved to Belfast in 2015 and Portland in 2018
3	Wendameen (Yacht)	Wendameen (Yacht)	March 26, 1992 (#92000273)	–	Camden harbor 44°12′34″N 69°03′48″W	Camden	Moved to Portland

== See also ==
- List of National Historic Landmarks in Maine
- National Register of Historic Places listings in Maine
