= Goose River (Rockport Harbor) =

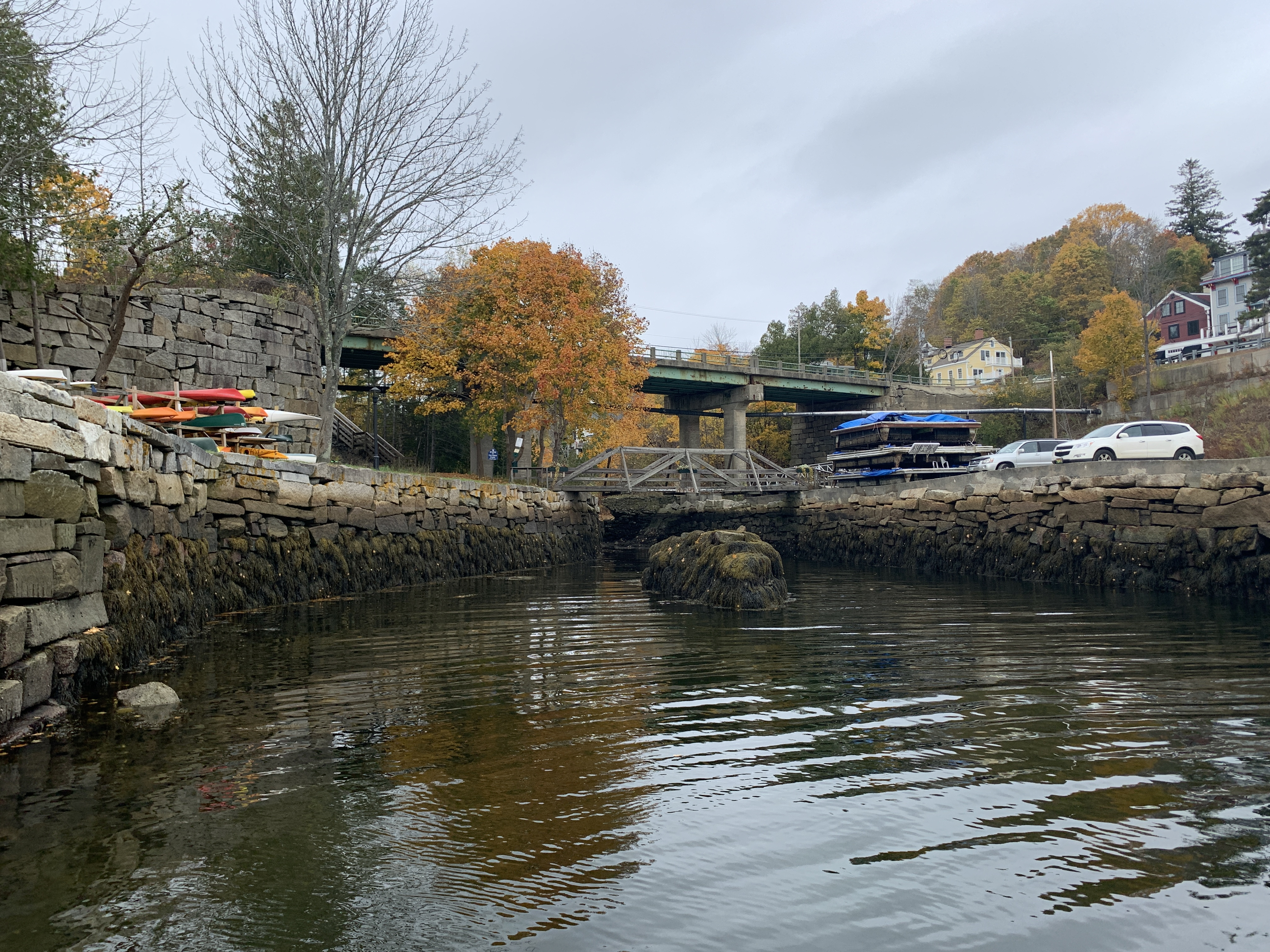
- Goose River near the mouth, October 2020

- Location of the mouth of the Goose River in Maine

Location
- Country: United States
- State: Maine
- County: Knox

Physical characteristics
- Source
  - location: Camden
  - coordinates: 44°12′40″N 69°07′27″W
  - elevation: 210 feet (64 m)
- Mouth: Rockport Harbor
  - location: Rockport
  - coordinates: 44°11′12″N 69°04′24″W
  - elevation: 7 feet (2.1 m)
- Length: 4.4 miles (7.1 km)

The Goose River is a river in Knox County, Maine. From the outflow of Hosmer Pond in Camden, the river runs 4.4 miles (7.1 km) southeast to Rockport Harbor, in Rockport.

== See also ==
- List of rivers of Maine
