= Thomaston, Maine (disambiguation) =

Thomaston, Maine is a town on the coast of Maine the United States. The name may also refer to:

- Thomaston (CDP), Maine, a census-designated place comprising the center of the town
- South Thomaston, Maine, an adjacent town
