= Maine State Route 73 =

State highway in Knox County, Maine, US

State Route 73

Route information
- Maintained by MaineDOT
- Length: 10.68 mi (17.19 km)
- Existed: 1963–present

Major junctions
- South end: SR 131 in St. George
- North end: US 1 in Rockland

Location
- Country: United States
- State: Maine
- Counties: Knox

Highway system
- Maine State Highway System; Interstate; US; State; Auto trails; Lettered highways
← SR 69	→ SR 77

State Route 73 (abbreviated SR 73) is part of Maine's system of numbered state highways, a coastal route located in southern Knox County. It runs for 10.7 miles (17.2 km) from an intersection with SR 131 in St. George to an intersection with U.S. Route 1 (US 1) in Rockland.

== Route description ==
SR 73 begins in St. George at SR 131 about eight miles (13 km) north of Marshall Point. SR 73 runs roughly parallel to SR 131 on the coastline, passing through the towns of South Thomaston and Owls Head without any major junctions. SR 73 crosses into Rockland and proceeds due north into the town center, where it ends at US 1.

SR 73 is known as Seal Harbor Road in St. George, Spruce Head Road in Spruce Head, Elm Street in South Thomaston, and Weskeag Road, Ingraham Drive and South Main Street in Rockland. Knox County Regional Airport is located along SR 73 in Owls Head.

== Junction list ==
The entire route is in Knox County.

Location	mi	km	Destinations	Notes
St. George	0.00	0.00	SR 131 (River Road) – St. George, Thomaston	
Rockland	10.68	17.19	US 1 (Park / Main Streets) to US 1A – Thomaston, Rockport	
1.000 mi = 1.609 km; 1.000 km = 0.621 mi
