= George Thorndike House =

Historic house in Maine, United States

- U.S. National Register of Historic Places
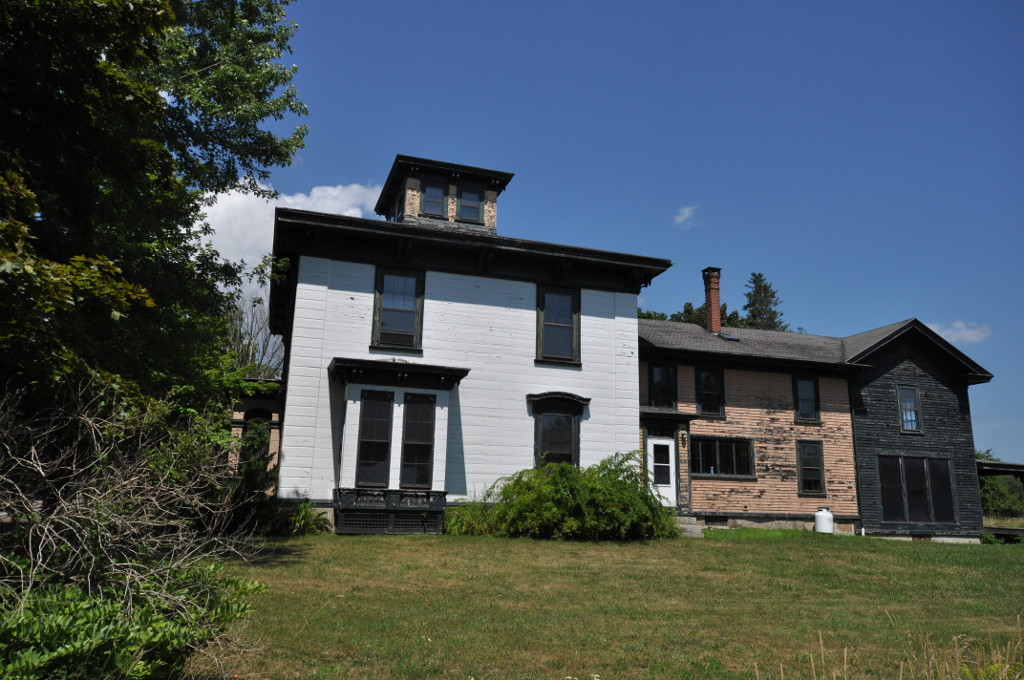

- Location within Maine Location within the United States
- Location: ME 73, South Thomaston, Maine
- Coordinates: 44°3′21″N 69°7′23″W
- Area: 0.3 acres (0.12 ha)
- Built: 1855
- Architect: Deane, Benjamin S.
- Architectural style: Italianate
- NRHP reference No.: 83000463
- Added to NRHP: January 11, 1983

The George Thorndike House is a historic house in Maine State Route 73 in South Thomaston, Maine. Built in 1855, it is one of the region's finest examples of Italianate architecture, its design attributed to Thomaston native Benjamin S. Deane. It was listed on the National Register of Historic Places in 1983.

== Description and history ==
The George Thorndike House stands on the east side of SR 73, north of the village center of South Thomaston, part of a row of late 19th-century houses. It is a 2 1/2-story wood-frame structure, with a hip roof topped by a large square belvedere. The walls are sheathed in flushboard that has been scored to resemble stone, and was originally painted with sand-impregnated paint to reinforce the illusion. The building has quoined corners, and a deep eave studded with paired brackets. Ground floor windows are set in segmented-arch openings topped by bracketed and eared cornices. The front facade is three bays wide, with the center entrance sheltered by a porch supported by paired square posts and topped by a bracketed roof. A 1 1/2-story gabled ell joins the house to a matching period carriage barn.

The house was built in 1855 for George Thorndike a prominent local shipbuilder and ship's captain. It was probably designed by the Bangor architect Benjamin S. Deane, a Thomaston native, but this attribution is based strictly on design similarities to Deane's work elsewhere, and his known association with the community. The house was, at the time of its construction, one of the most architecturally sophisticated in the region, and is one of only a few in central Maine from the period that has a rusticated exterior.

== See also ==
- National Register of Historic Places listings in Knox County, Maine
