= Benjamin S. Deane =

American architect

- Born: August 7, 1790; Thomaston, Maine
- Died: December 2, 1867 (aged 77); Bangor, Maine
- Occupation: Architect

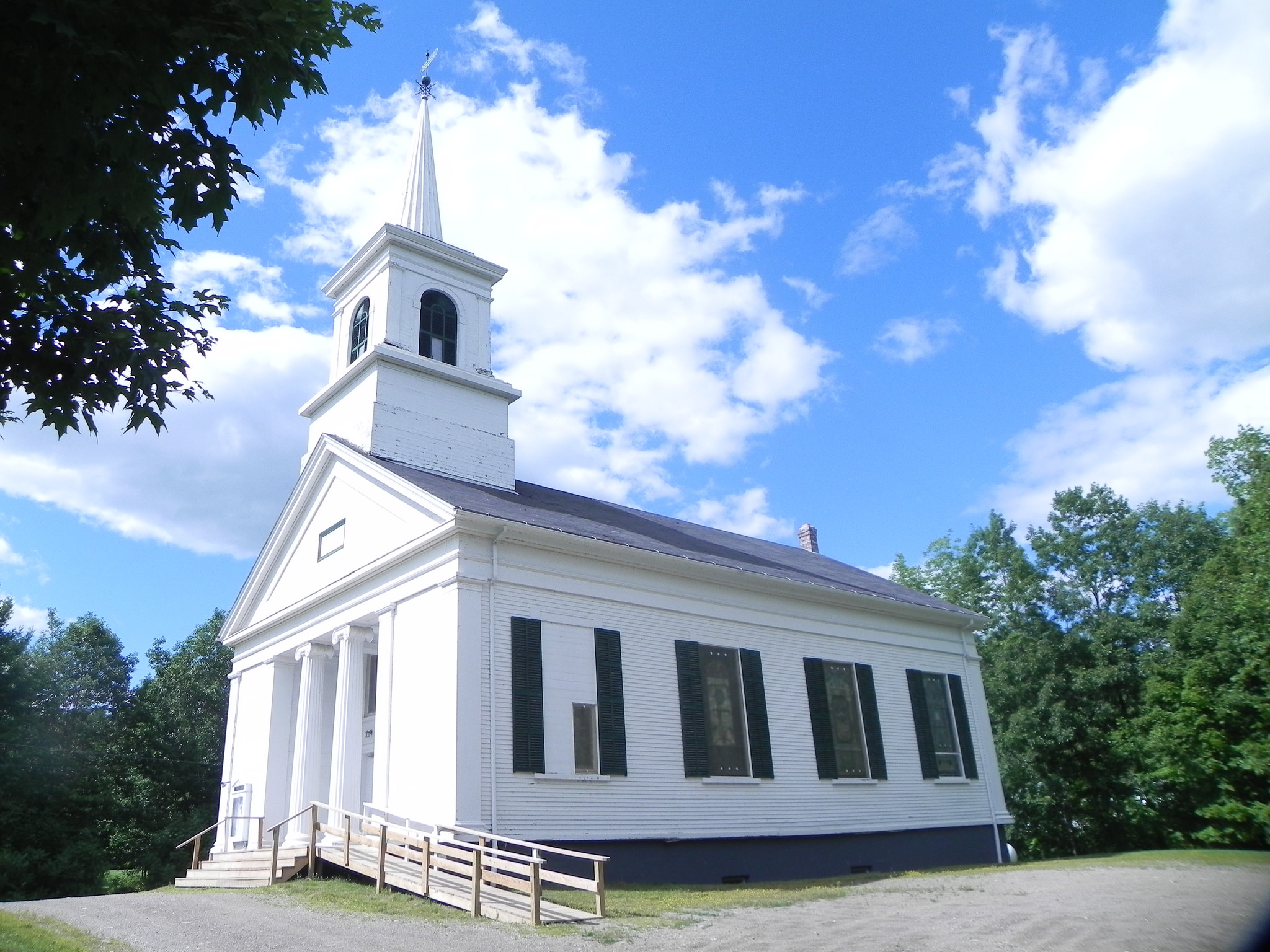
The Stetson Union Church, designed and built by Deane in 1843.

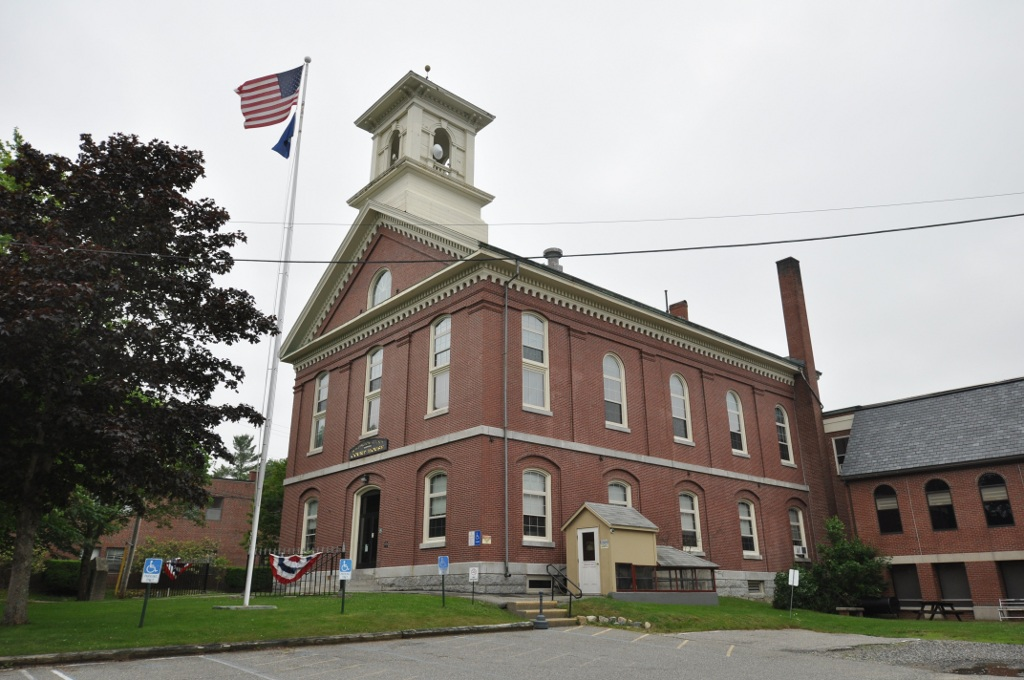
The Washington County Courthouse in Machias, completed in 1854.

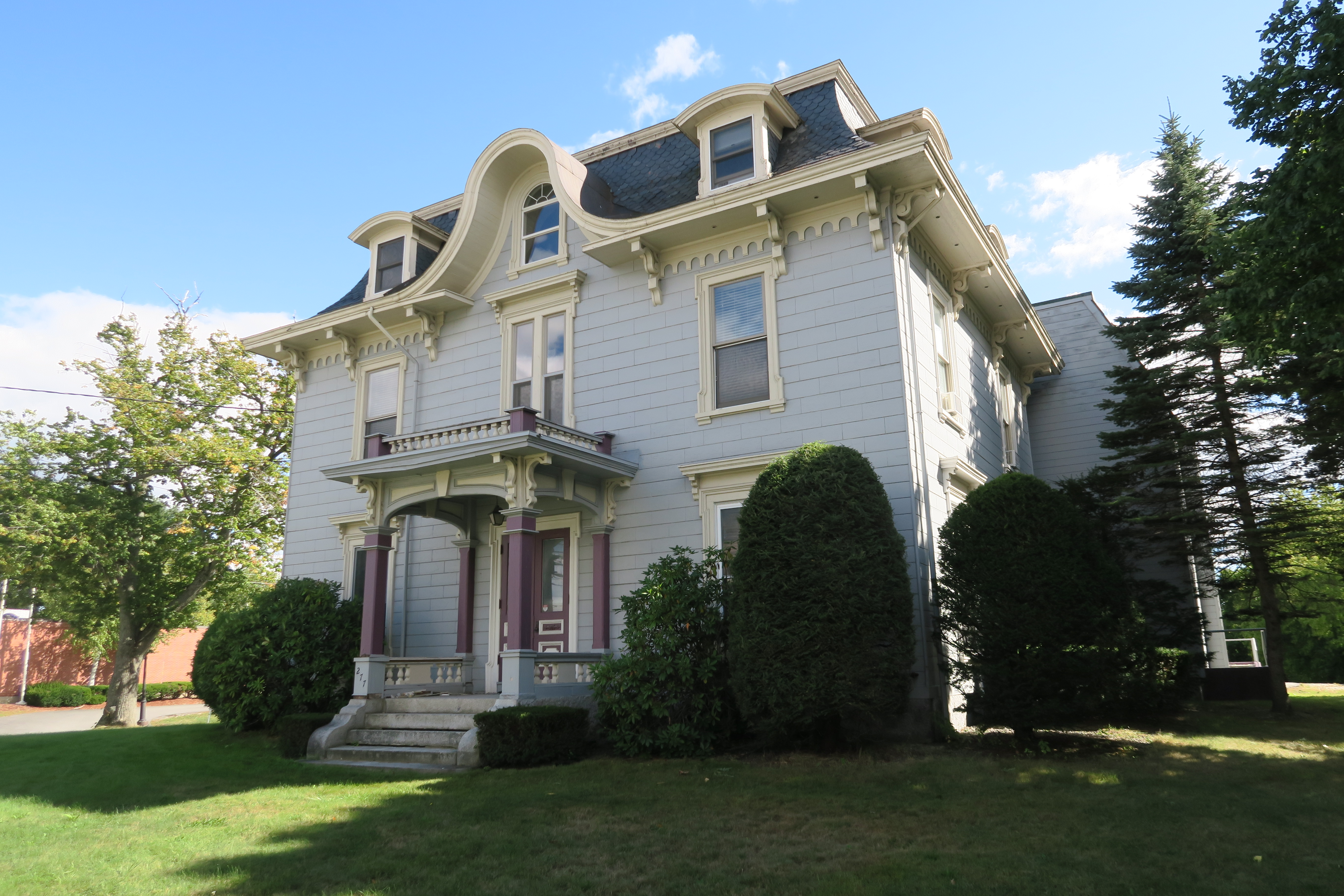
The Edward Connors house in Bangor, completed in 1867.

Benjamin S. Deane (1790–1867) was an American master builder and architect in practice in Bangor, Maine, from c. 1832 to 1867.

== Life and career ==
Benjamin Small Deane was born August 7, 1790, in Thomaston, Maine, to Jonas Deane and Ruth (Small) Deane. A housewright by training, he built churches in Thomaston and Belfast before moving to Bangor c. 1832. He quickly became locally successful, and in 1835 was chosen builder of St. John's Episcopal Church, an important early work of architect Richard Upjohn. He continued thereafter as a builder, but like many master builders was also responsible for the design of buildings he built. It is not known when Deane began to use the title "architect," but was at least by the early 1850s. During the remainder of his life he was the only settled practicing architect in Maine outside of Portland.

As a designer, Deane paid close attention to national trends. Though in his early career he kept to the Greek Revival style, in his later career he designed some of the earliest Italianate and Second Empire buildings in Maine. During the early 1850s he was assisted in his office by Edwin Lee Brown, later an architect in Boston and New York City. In 1859 Deane was supervising architect for Brown in the construction of the Wheelwright Block, which is frequently and incorrectly attributed to Deane alone.

== Personal life ==
In 1814 Deane was married to Elizabeth Fales of Thomaston. He died December 2, 1867.

Deane was elected several times to both houses of the Bangor city council. He was a member of the common council for the years 1838–39, 1848–49 and 1849–50 and of the board of alderman for the years 1842–43, 1844–45, 1845–46.

== Legacy ==
Deane's First Baptist Church at Sedgwick, built in 1837, has been identified by former National Park Service architectural historian Denys Peter Myers as "one of the finest and most suavely designed wooden Greek Revival churches in New England." In this and other works Deane borrowed from pattern books, including those of Asher Benjamin.

At least seven of his works are listed on the United States National Register of Historic Places, and others contribute to listed historic districts.

== Architectural works ==
- North Church (former), (Note: A contributing property to the Belfast Historic District, NRHP-listed in 1986.) 143 Church St, Belfast, Maine (1831, altered)
- Elm Street Congregational Church, 31 Elm St, Bucksport, Maine (1836–38, NRHP 1990)
- First Baptist Church, 25 Reach Rd, Sedgwick, Maine (1837, NRHP 1973)
- Stetson Union Church, 7 Wolfboro Rd, Stetson, Maine (1843, NRHP 1981)
- George K. Stetson house, (Note: A contributing property to the Broadway Historic District, NRHP-listed in 1973.) 208 French St, Bangor, Maine (1847)
- City Block, 143 High St, Belfast, Maine (1850)
- Hayward Pierce house, 42 Broadway, Bangor, Maine (1851)
- Somesville Union Meeting House, (Note: A contributing property to the Somesville Historic District, NRHP-listed in 1975.) 1136 Main St, Mount Desert, Maine (1852)
- Washington County Courthouse, 85 Court St, Machias, Maine (1853–54, NRHP 1976)
- Waldo County Courthouse, 137 Church St, Belfast, Maine (1853–54)
- George Thorndike house, 65 Elm St, South Thomaston, Maine (1855, attributed, NRHP 1983)
- Wheelwright Block, (Note: A contributing property to the West Market Square Historic District, NRHP-listed in 1979.) 34 Hammond St, Bangor, Maine (1859, NRHP 1974)
- Edward Connors house, 277 State St, Bangor, Maine (1866–67, NRHP 1983)
