= Oyster (disambiguation) =

An oyster is a bivalve mollusc.

Oyster may also refer to:

- Ostreidae, the family of true oysters

== Arts, entertainment and media ==
- Oyster (magazine), an Australian magazine about pop culture
- Oysters (painting), an 1862 painting by Édouard Manet
- The Oyster, an 1880s Victorian erotic magazine published in London
- Oyster (novel), by Janette Turner Hospital
- "Oysters" (short story), by Anton Chekhov
- Oyster, a character in the novel Lullaby by Chuck Palahniuk
- Oyster (Heather Nova album), 1994
- Oyster (Chloe Moriondo album), 2025
- "Oyster", a 1995 song by Jawbreaker from Dear You

== Business ==
- Rolex Oyster, a model of Rolex watches
- Oyster (company), a former streaming service for digital e-books, acquired by Google in 2015 and shut down in 2016
- Oyster Yachts, a British brand of luxury sailing yachts

== People ==
- Oyster Burns (1864–1928), American Major League Baseball player
- James F. Oyster (1851–1925), American government official and merchant
- Megan Montefusco (born 1992), née Oyster, American retired professional soccer player

== Places ==
- Oyster, Virginia, United States, an unincorporated community
- Oyster Peak, Alberta, Canada
- Oyster River (disambiguation), including a list of rivers
- Oyster Creek (New Jersey)
- Oyster Creek (Texas)

== Other uses ==
- Oyster (fowl), a cut of poultry
- A shade of the color beige
- Operation Oyster, a Second World War Royal Air Force bombing raid on the Netherlands
- Oyster card, a smart card utilising near field communication used on public transport in and around London, UK
- Oyster wave energy converter, a device that transforms the motion of ocean waves to create electricity
- The Oyster, an 1891 book by William Keith Brooks (1848–1908), American zoologist

== See also ==
- Oyster Oyster, Washington, DC, a restaurant
- Oyster Bayou, Texas, United States, a river
- Oyster Point (Australia), Queensland
- Oyster Pond (Martha's Vineyard), Massachusetts, United States
- Oyster Rock, an island in the Mumbai Harbour, Mumbai, India
- Oyster Rocks, a pair of islands in Tasmania, Australia
- Oyster Rocks, Karachi, off the coast of Karachi, Pakistan
- NGC 1501, also known as the Oyster Nebula, a planetary nebula
- Rocky Mountain oysters, bull testicles served as food
