= Oyster River =

Oyster River may refer to:

== Rivers ==
=== United States ===
- Oyster River (Connecticut)
- Oyster River (Maine)
  - East Branch Oyster River
  - West Branch Oyster River
- Oyster River (Minnesota)
- Oyster River (New Hampshire)

=== Canada ===
- Oyster River (New Brunswick)

== Other uses ==
- Oyster River, British Columbia, Canada
- Oyster River Plantation, a historic name of Durham, New Hampshire
  - Oyster River Cooperative School District
  - Oyster River High School, the local high school
  - Oyster River Press, a local publisher

== See also ==
- Raid on Oyster River, a 1694 event
