= Spruce Head, Maine =

- Village
- Location within Maine
- Coordinates: 44°00′41″N 69°07′58″W
- Country: United States
- State: Maine
- County: Knox
- Elevation: 39 ft (12 m)
- Time zone: UTC-5 (Eastern (EST))
  - Summer (DST): UTC-4 (EDT)
- ZIP code: 04859
- Area code: 207
- GNIS feature ID: 576134

Spruce Head is an unincorporated village in Knox County, Maine, United States. The community is located on Penobscot Bay and Maine State Route 73 6.5 miles (10.5 km) south of Rockland. Spruce Head has a post office with ZIP code 04859, which opened on March 4, 1880.

The village of Spruce Head lies partly in the township of South Thomaston and partly in the township of St. George and is connected by a bridge to Sprucehead Island, which is entirely within the borders of South Thomaston. The island faces the Muscle Ridge Islands to the east across a navigable channel. Seal Harbor, locally referred to as Spruce Head Harbor, is a well-protected anchorage formed by the southern shore of Sprucehead Island, the eastern shores of Patten Point and Rackliff Island, and the northern shores of Norton Island and Whitehead Island. Spruce Head village centers on the post office, Spruce Head Community Church (built in the late 19th century), and the Spruce Head Community Hall (built in 1923). An adjacent boatyard provides facilities for launching, recovering, and storing fishing vessels and pleasure craft. Rackliff Island, reached from the mainland by a causeway, is inhabited by several hundred households; it lies within St. George township. An additional hamlet considered part of Spruce Head is found along Clark Island Road on the western shore of Wheeler Bay and also lies within the township of St. George. It affords access to the Clark Island Preserve, a part of the Maine Coast Heritage Trust and is also the location of the headquarters of the Hurricane Island Outward Bound School.

Spruce Head was the boyhood home of poet and Connecticut Governor Wilbert Snow, who was born on Whitehead Island and is buried in the Ocean View Cemetery at Spruce Head.

The island is home to an active lobster fishing fleet, several lobster wholesalers, and a lobster shack, which in 2017 was reviewed by Yankee Magazine as having the best lobster roll in Maine. The Spruce Head Fisherman's Co-op is the third largest fishing co-operative in Maine. In 2024 the Spruce Head fleet recorded landings valued at $20.63 million, the fifth highest in Maine for the year.

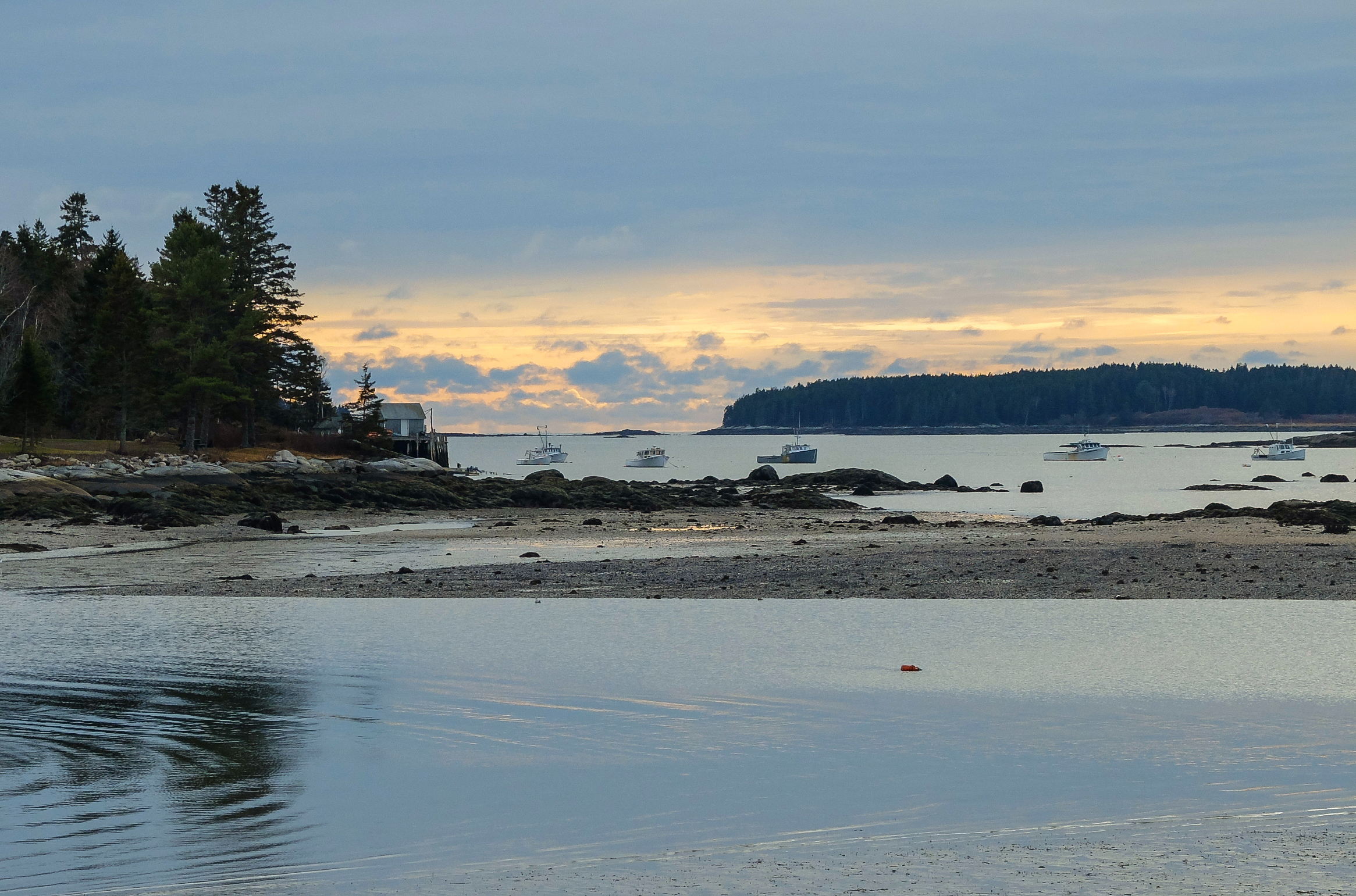
