= East Branch Oyster River =

Location
- Country: United States

Physical characteristics
- Source
  - location: Maine
  - elevation: 220 feet (67 m)
- Mouth
  - location: Oyster River
  - coordinates: 44°06′49″N 69°11′36″W
  - elevation: 20 feet (6.1 m)
- Length: 4.8 mi (7.7 km)

Basin features
- Progression: Oyster River – St. George River – Muscongus Bay

The East Branch Oyster River is a tributary of the Oyster River in Knox County, Maine. From its source (44°09′03″N 69°08′29″W) in Rockland, the stream runs 4.8 miles (7.7 km) southwest to its confluence with the main stem of the Oyster River, on the border between Warren and Thomaston.

== See also ==
- List of rivers of Maine
