= Pay the Piper =

Pay the Piper may refer to:

- Pay the Piper (novel), by Adelyn Bushnell
- "Pay the Piper" (The Flash), a 2020 television episode
- "Pay the Piper" (Murdoch Mysteries), a 2022 television episode

== See also ==
- Paying the Piper, a 1949 cartoon
- Paying the Piper (film), a 1921 silent film
