= Thomaston Historic District =

Historic district in Maine, United States

- U.S. National Register of Historic Places
- U.S. Historic district
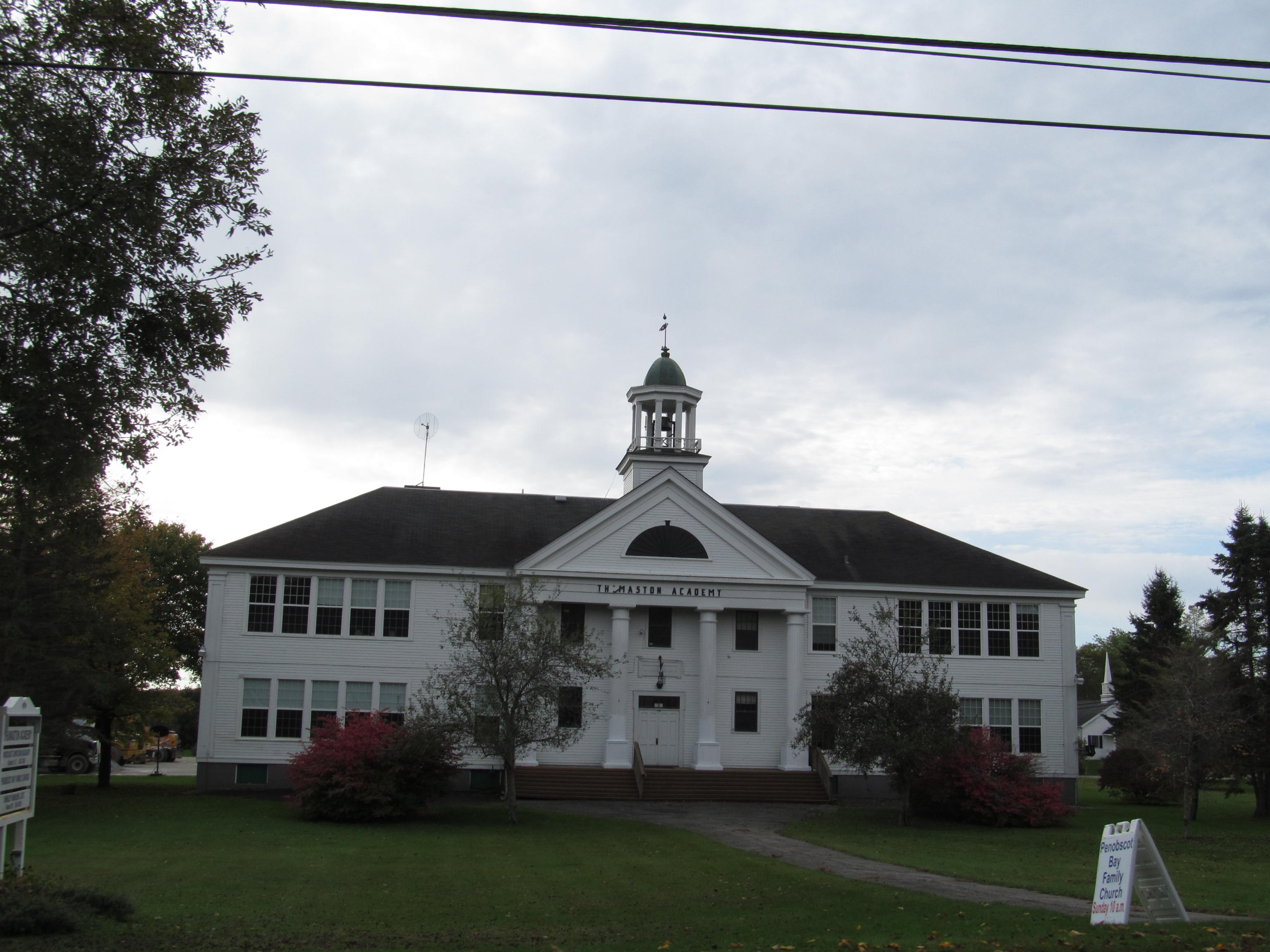
- Thomaston Academy

- Location within Maine
- Location: Runs through Blue Star Memorial Hwy. (US 1) between Wadsworth St. and ME 131, Thomaston, Maine
- Coordinates: 44°4′38″N 69°10′54″W
- Area: 125 acres (51 ha)
- Architect: Multiple
- Architectural style: Mid-19th-Century Revival, Italianate, Federal
- NRHP reference No.: 74000176
- Added to NRHP: May 2, 1974

The Thomaston Historic District encompasses much of the historic town center of Thomaston, Maine. With a settlement history dating to the 17th century, the town is now a showcase of 19th-century architectural styles up to the 1870s. The district extends for about 2 miles (3.2 km) along United States Route 1, and was listed on the National Register of Historic Places in 1974.

== Description and history ==
The town center of Thomaston is located at one of the heads of Muscongus Bay, directly adjacent to the mouth of the St. George River on Maine's Mid Coast. This area was first explored by Europeans in the early 17th century, and was the site of trading post for Native Americans in 1630. Settlement did not begin on a large scale until the 1730s because of conflicts with the natives, and the town was incorporated in 1777. The production of lime was from an early date an economically significant industry, as were lumbering and shipbuilding. These industries, and the business activities of American Revolutionary War General Henry Knox in the late 18th century, were critical factors in the town's growth.

The historic district primarily along United States Route 1 between Kossuth Street and Maine State Route 131, and along Knox Street, which extends south from US 1 to the harbor. The eastern end of the district is anchored by the 1929 reproduction of General Knox's mansion house, the deteriorated original having been razed in the 1860s. The brick commercial buildings found on Main Street date mainly from the late 19th century, although there is one from the 1850s. Houses lining the streets include fine examples of the Federal and Greek Revival styles. The Baptist church was built in 1828, and given late Victorian styling in the 1870s, while the 1868-69 Episcopal church is a fine example wooden Gothic Revival, reminiscent of the designs of Richard Upjohn but actually the work of Portland architect Francis H. Fassett.

== See also ==
- National Register of Historic Places listings in Knox County, Maine
