= Whitehead Lifesaving Station =

- U.S. National Register of Historic Places
- U.S. Historic district
- Location within Maine
- Location: Whitehead Island, St. George, Maine
- Coordinates: 43°58′43″N 69°7′57″W
- Area: 4 acres (1.6 ha)
- Built: 1874
- Architect: Chandler, Francis W.; Mendelheff, Victor
- Architectural style: Colonial Revival, Stick/eastlake
- NRHP reference No.: 88001839
- Added to NRHP: October 12, 1988

The Whitehead Lifesaving Station was a maritime rescue facility on Whitehead Island, an island off the coast of St. George, Maine at the mouth of Penobscot Bay. Established in 1874 by the United States Life-Saving Service, its original building is one of the best-preserved of the five stations built by the service on the coast of Maine and New Hampshire at that time. The station was in active use until the 1940s, and is now privately owned. It was listed on the National Register of Historic Places in 1988.

== Description and history ==
Whitehead Island is a 90-acre (36 ha) island off the northeastern coast of St. George, near the southwestern approach to Penobscot Bay. In addition to the former lifesaving station, the island is also home to Whitehead Light, located at its southeastern point. The lifesaving station is located near the southwestern point of the island, between it and a small peninsula jutting to the south. Its historic features include the original 1874 building, located near the water, and a 1922 residential structure set further inland. Between these two structures is a small parade ground which was used by the station crews for drills; part of this ground includes the foundation point where a "wreck pole" was mounted, simulating the mast of a ship. The 1874 building is a two-story rectangular wood frame structure with decorative Italianate features, while the 1922 residence is a modest vernacular two-story building with a hip roof.

The original 1874 building was probably designed by Francis Chandler, who was employed in the Office of the Supervising Architect of the United States Treasury Department. The 1922 building was probably designed by Victor Mendelhoff, the principal architect of the United States Life-Saving Service from 1896. The Life-Saving Service was merged into the United States Coast Guard, which closed the facility about 1944, selling it into private ownership. Most of Whitehead Island is privately owned, with a conservation easement protecting most of it. The facilities of the station are rented by the owners to the Pine Island Camp, which owns the lighthouse complex and conducts trips to the island.

== See also ==
- National Register of Historic Places listings in Knox County, Maine
