= Whitehead Light =

Lighthouse in Maine, US

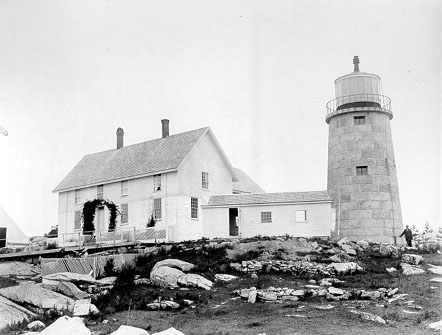
- Location: Penobscot Bay entrance, Maine
- Coordinates: 43°58′43.369″N 69°7′27.397″W

Tower
- Constructed: 1804
- Foundation: Natural / emplaced
- Construction: Granite
- Automated: 1982
- Height: 41 feet (12 m)
- Shape: Conical
- Markings: Natural
- Heritage: National Register of Historic Places listed place
- Fog signal: HORN: 2 every 30s

Light
- First lit: 1852 (current structure)
- Focal height: 75 feet (23 m)
- Lens: 3rd order Fresnel lens (1855), 12 inches (300 mm), (1982)
- Range: 6 nautical miles (11 km; 6.9 mi)
- Characteristic: Oc G 4s
- Whitehead Light Station
- U.S. National Register of Historic Places
- U.S. Historic district
- Location: Whitehead Island, St. George, Maine
- Area: 11.1 acres (4.5 ha)
- Built: 1852
- Architect: US Army Corps of Engineers
- MPS: Light Stations of Maine MPS
- NRHP reference No.: 88000154
- Added to NRHP: March 14, 1988

Whitehead Light is a lighthouse on Whitehead Island, on Muscle Ridge Channel, in the southwestern entrance to Penobscot Bay, Maine. It is in the town of St.George. Established in 1804, it is one of Maine's oldest light stations, with its present tower built in 1852 to a design attributed to Alexander Parris. It was listed on the National Register of Historic Places as Whitehead Light Station on March 14, 1988. The property is now owned by not for profit Pine Island Camp. Whitehead light station offers to the public various stays at the light station from getaway weekends to learning retreats and renting the station as a vacation home. The light itself remains an active aid to navigation, maintained by the United States Coast Guard.

== Description and history ==
Whitehead Island is a 90-acre (36 ha) island off the northeastern coast of St. George, near the southwestern approach to Penobscot Bay. In addition to the lighthouse complex, the island is also home to the former Whitehead Lifesaving Station, located near its southwestern point. The light station is located at the island's southeastern point, and includes the lighthouse, keeper's house, oilhouse, and a fog signal building. The tower is built out of cut granite blocks, rising to a sixteen-sided lantern house surrounded by an iron walkway and railing. A small brick service room projects from one side. Adjacent to the tower is the keeper's house, a 1-1/2 story wood frame structure with a gabled roof and a T-shaped configuration. The oilhouse is a small brick structure with a gabled roof and an entrance on one side. The fog signal is a square brick building with a hip roof.

The light station on Whitehead Island was authorized in 1804 by President Thomas Jefferson, and went into service in 1807; it is the third-oldest active light station in the state of Maine. The present tower was built in 1852, its design attributed to Alexander Parris, on the basis of its similarity to the Monhegan Island Light, which is known to be Parris' work. The keeper's house is a replacement, built in 1891, the same year the oilhouse was built. The fog signal was added in 1869-70, a consequence of the area's frequent foggy conditions. The complex originally included covered ways between the major buildings, but these have been removed. The station was automated in 1982, at which time the keeper's house was boarded up.

In 1996, as part of the Maine Lights Program, Whitehead Light Station became property of Pine Island Camp, a 100+ year old non profit institution in central Maine. Whitehead Light Station keepers house and school house were painstakingly renovated over a 12-year period and are now beautifully restored. The light station offers adult enrichment programs during the summer months and is also available for rent by the week. The house has 7 bedrooms each with its own bathroom, three sitting rooms, a modern kitchen and dining room.

== Keepers ==
- Ellis Dolph (1804–1807)
- Ebenezer Otis (1813–1816)
- Charles Haskell (1816–1821)
- Samuel Davis (1821–1840)
- William Perry, Jr. (1840–1841 and 1845–1849)
- Joshua Bartlett (1849)
- Dennis Pillsbury (1853)
- Samuel B. Stackpole (1853–1858)
- Albert Thomas, assistant (1854)
- Edwin R. Stackpole (1853–1858)
- Eugene Stackpole, assistant (1857)
- Elisha Snow. Assistant (1857–1859)
- Isaac Sterns (1858–1860)
- Thomas Shoutts, assistant (1859–1860)
- Samuel Ludwig, assistant (1860)
- William Spear (1860–1861)
- William Spear, Jr., assistant (1860–1861)
- Ephraim Quinn (1861–1862)
- William Perry, assistant (1861–1862)
- Archibald McKellar (1862)
- James McKellar, assistant (1862)
- Edward Spaulding (1862–1865)
- E. Cooper Spaulding, assistant (1862–1866)
- Hezekiah Long (1865–1875)
- Horace Norton, assistant (1866–1874)
- Abbie B. Long, assistant (1867–1875)
- Isaac N. Grant (1875–1890)
- Abbie B. Grant, assistant (1875–1890)
- Knot Perry, assistant (1876)
- George L. Upton (1890–1892)
- Frank N. Jellison (assistant 1890–1892, keeper 1892–1905)
- Daniel Stevens (1892)
- George Matthews, assistant (1892–1898)
- Joseph W. Jellison, second assistant (1895–1898)
- Walden B. Hodgkins, second assistant (1899–1902)
- Otto A. Wilson, second assistant (1899)
- George S. Connors, second assistant (1899–1902)
- Edward T. Merritt, second assistant (1902–1903)
- Elmer Reed, assistant, then keeper (1902–1912)
- George M. Joyce, second assistant (1903–1905)
- A. Faulkingham, second assistant, then first assistant (1905–1909)
- Stephen F. Flood, first assistant (1905–1907)
- Frank B. Ingalls, second assistant (1907–1909)
- Fairfield H, Moore, first assistant (1909–1911)
- John E. Purrington, second assistant (1909–1911)
- Lester Leighton, second assistant (1911–1913)
- Charles Robinson, assistant (1913–unknown)
- Hervey H, Wass, first assistant (1913–1919)
- Arthur B. Mitchell (1919–1929)
- Arthur Marston (1923–1928)
- Arthur J. Beal (1929–1950)
- Frank Alley, second assistant (1928–194?)
- George Lester Alley, first assistant (1926–194?)
- Clyde Grant (Coast Guard, c. 1950)
- Gordon P. Eaton (Coast Guard, c. 1950–1952)
- Richard (Rick) Ames (Coast Guard, c. 1950)
- Russell A Lane (Coast Guard, c. 1958-1960)
- Ronald Upton (Coast Guard keeper, 9/1973–5/1974)

== See also ==
- National Register of Historic Places listings in Knox County, Maine
