= Oyster Pond =

Oyster Pond may refer to:

- Oyster Pond (Martha's Vineyard) - a pond on Martha’s Vineyard, Massachusetts
- Oyster Pond (Cape Cod) - a pond in Chatham, Massachusetts on Cape Cod
- Oyster Pond, Saint Martin - a village in the French Collectivity of Saint Martin
