= Mill River (St. George River tributary) =

Location
- Country: United States

Physical characteristics
- Source
  - location: Maine
- Mouth
  - location: St. George River
  - coordinates: 44°04′28″N 69°10′21″W
  - elevation: sea level

The Mill River is a tributary of the St. George River in Thomaston, Maine. From the confluence (44°05′57″N 69°10′03″W) of Branch Brook and Meadow Brook, the river runs 2.7 miles (4.3 km) south to the head of the estuary of the St. George.

== See also ==
- List of rivers of Maine
