= Albert S. Bickmore =

American naturalist and founder of the American Museum of Natural History

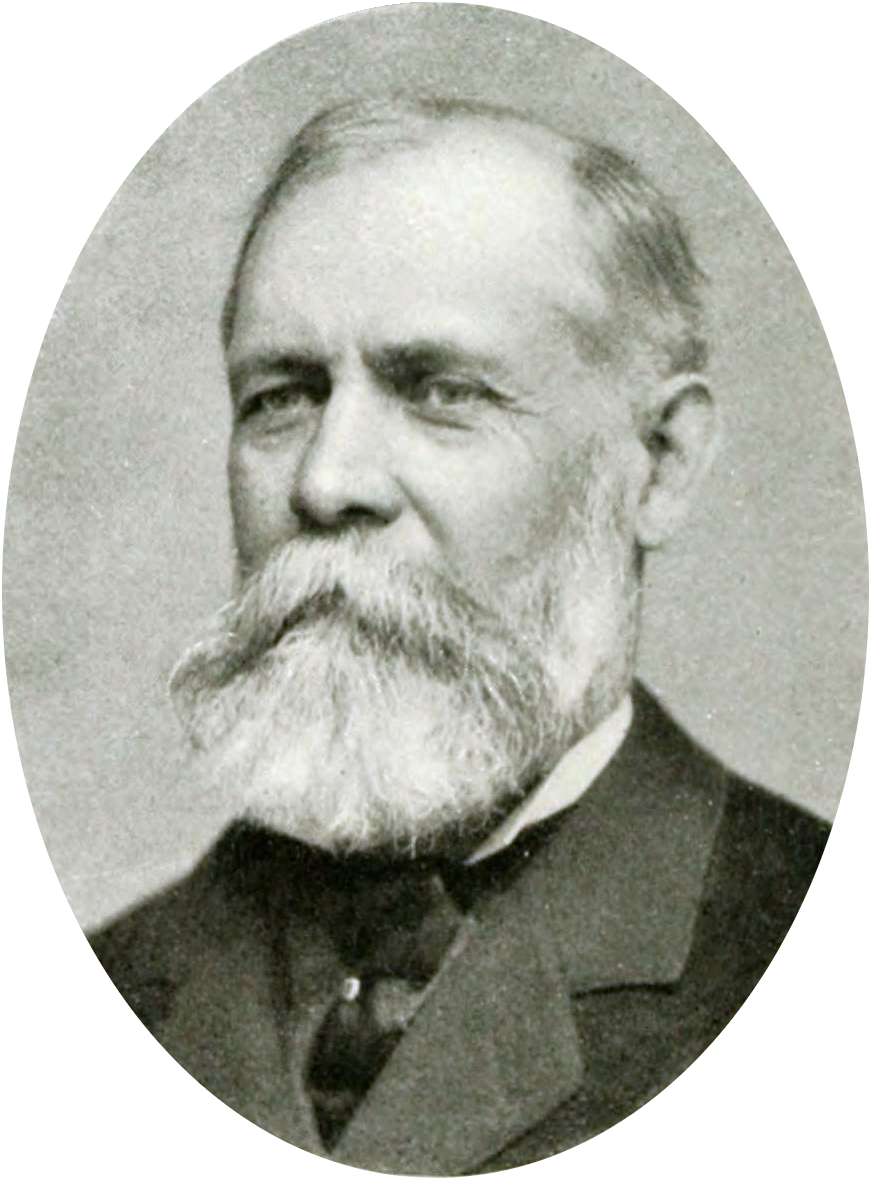
- Born: March 1, 1839; St. George, Maine, U.S.
- Died: August 12, 1914 (aged 75); Nonquitt, Massachusetts, U.S.
- Occupations: Naturalist, museum official

Albert Smith Bickmore (March 1, 1839 – August 12, 1914) was an American naturalist and originator of the American Museum of Natural History in New York City, becoming one of its founders.

== Childhood ==
Bickmore was born in the town of St. George near Martinsville harbor, Maine, on March 1, 1839. He attributed his childhood living on the beach and near a forest to his love of nature and vocation as a naturalist. As a child, he collected shells and sea urchins, learned the names of the local flora and fauna, and skated on a nearby pond on winter evenings. According to Bickmore, the church and the school were the centers of the community of St. George. Books were scarce, however, and in his earliest childhood, he remembered being permitted to hold in his hands "Goldsmith's Natural History, Abridged," which he treasured like a sacred relic. He loved to look at its crude illustrations of animals and to memorize them. At age 8, he spent a year traveling in France with his parents and sister.

== Education ==
He later attended prep school in New London, New Hampshire, then went on to Dartmouth College, where his favorite subjects were chemistry, geology, and mineralogy. His love of natural history was noted by the Dartmouth faculty, who gave him a letter of introduction to study under the well-known Harvard professor Louis Agassiz. After graduating with the class of 1860, he went on to become one of Agassiz's handful of special students. He also worked in Agassiz's Museum of Comparative Zoology, which helped him pay his way through a four-year course of study. It was during this time that Bickmore began to visualize founding a Museum of Natural History in New York City, as the European museums of natural history were in political and monetary capitals, and New York was a logical American parallel city. When the Prince of Wales (the future Edward VII) visited Cambridge, MA in 1861, Henry Acland of the University of Oxford joined him. Bickmore was privileged to discuss his plans for a museum with Dr. Acland, whose encouragement strengthened his determination to found such a museum. Others had previously failed to generate the necessary funds to establish a museum.

== Civil War military service ==
In late 1862, Bickmore joined the 44th Regiment of Massachusetts Volunteers under Col. Francis L. Lee. The Regiment was sent to New Bern, NC, in October 1862 to serve under Major General John G. Foster. They encountered the Confederate Army at Whitehall in December 1862, sustaining heavy casualties, but Bickmore remained unharmed. Bickmore then requested to keep the meteorological record at a hospital near Cape Lookout. He then traveled home to resume his studies at Harvard.

== Book written ==
Albert S. Bickmore wrote a book titled: "Travels in the East Indian Archipelago," published in 1868. The preface begins by saying, "The object of my voyage to Amboina was simply to re-collect the shells figured in Rumphius's 'Rari-teit Kamer,' and the idea of writing a volume of travels was not seriously entertained until I arrived at Batavia, and, instead of being forbidden by the Dutch Government to proceed to the Spice Islands, as some of my warmest friends feared, I was honored by His Excellency, the Governor-General of 'the Netherlands India,'..." His expedition in the East Indian Archipelago covered April 1865 to May 1866. He arrived at Batavia on 30 April 1865 on the Memnon a Sear's clipper ship, Captain Freeman, out of Boston.
