= Elm Street Congregational Church and Parish House =

Historic church in Maine, United States

- U.S. National Register of Historic Places
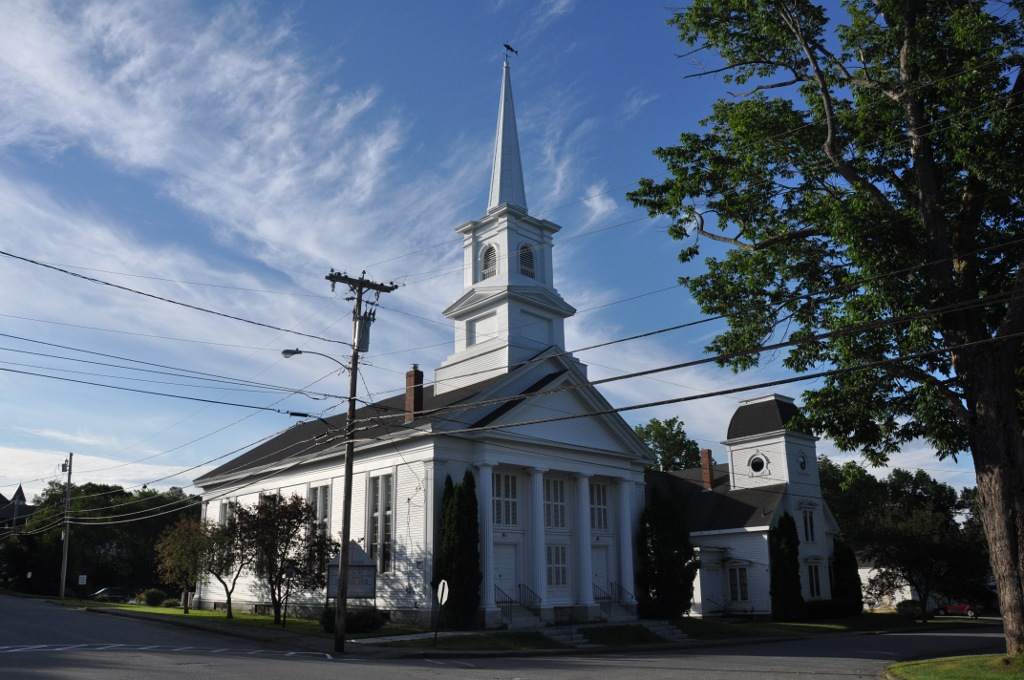

- Location within Maine Location within the United States
- Location: Jct. of Elm and Franklin Sts., Bucksport, Maine
- Coordinates: 44°34′24″N 68°47′41″W
- Area: 1.5 acres (0.61 ha)
- Built: 1838
- Architect: Deane, Benjamin S.
- Architectural style: Greek Revival, Second Empire
- NRHP reference No.: 90000925
- Added to NRHP: June 14, 1990

The Elm Street Congregational Church and Parish House is a historic church complex at Elm and Franklin Streets in Bucksport, Maine. It includes a Greek Revival church building, built in 1838 to a design by Benjamin S. Deane, and an 1867 Second Empire parish house. The church congregation was founded in 1803; its present pastor is the Rev. Debra Arnold. The church and parish house were listed on the National Register of Historic Places in 1990.

== Architecture ==
The church is a basically rectangular wood-frame structure, set facing west at the corner of Elm and Franklin Streets. It has a gable roof which is topped at the front by a multistage tower. The tower begins with a short square stage, above which is a slightly taller and narrower section with deeply recessed panels, topped by gabled shallow pediments. Above that is the belfry, with round-arch louvered openings and corner pilasters, topped by an entablature, above which the steeple rises to a weathervane. The main facade has a projecting tetrastyle Greek temple portico with an entablature and fully pedimented gable. Under the portico are a pair of entrances, with windows above and between them. The buildings corners are pilastered, and the side walls have tall sash windows.

The two entrances lead into separate but linked vestibule areas, which lead into the nave, which has two groups of pews divided by center and side aisles. A projecting arch highlights the chancel, and a segmented-arch opening frames the 1863 organ housing.

The parish house is joined to the church by narrow covered passage built in 1970. It is a 2 1/2-story wood-frame structure, with a mansard roof and a three-story tower, also topped by a mansard roof, projects slightly at the center of the main facade. The first two levels of the tower have paired four-over-four windows, repeated in the flanking bays on either side, and there are bullseye oriel windows in the third level of the tower. Entrances are in recessed wing vestibules on either side of the main block.

== History ==
The Elm Street congregation was established in 1803, and built its first sanctuary in 1811–14. That building was sold after the construction of this one, and was sold to the town has a school and town hall after the present church was built; it was destroyed by fire in 1910. The congregation commissioned Bangor architect Benjamin S. Deane to design their new sanctuary, which was completed in 1838. It is one of the least-altered of Deane's early works, which include a number of other area churches, as well as numerous buildings in Bangor. The major changes include replacing the tower with the current one in 1850, and the lengthening of the building to the east by one bay to accommodate more pews. The organ was installed in 1863. At some point the interior was decorated with trompe-l'œil murals, but these were removed during a 1928 restoration. The parish house was built in 1876; its architect is unknown.

== See also ==
- National Register of Historic Places listings in Hancock County, Maine
