= First Baptist Church (Sedgwick, Maine) =

Historic church in Maine, United States

- U.S. National Register of Historic Places
- Location within Maine Location within the United States
- Location: High Street, Sedgwick, Maine
- Coordinates: 44°18′16″N 68°36′52″W
- Area: 9.9 acres (4.0 ha)
- Architect: Deane, Benjamin S.
- Architectural style: Greek Revival
- NRHP reference No.: 73000109
- Added to NRHP: April 24, 1973

The First Baptist Church is a historic church building on High Street, off Maine State Route 172 in Sedgwick, Maine. It was designed in Greek Revival style by architect Benjamin S. Deane, based on published drawings by Asher Benjamin, and built in 1837 for a congregation founded in 1805. It is one of coastal Maine's finest Greek Revival churches, and was listed on the National Register of Historic Places in 1973.

== Description and history ==
The First Baptist Church is set facing east on the south side of High Street in Sedgwick, between Maine Routes 172 and 175. Its facade is dominated by a massive projecting Greek pedimented gable temple front, supported by fluted Doric columns. The building's front corners are pilasters, a detail repeated where the projecting temple front meets the front wall. The front facade behind the temple front is flushboarded, while the remaining walls are clapboarded. The church has a multi-stage tower that is square in the first two stages, followed by an octagonal belfry with four round-arch louvered openings, topped by a round cupola and spire.

Sedgwick's Baptist congregation was established in 1794 as a Congregationalist organization with Rev. Daniel Merrill as its minister. The congregation underwent a large-scale conversion to Baptistry in 1805, taking 75% of the Congregationalist membership. This congregation retained Bangor architect Benjamin S. Deane to design its church, which was built in 1837. Deane's design is based on a drawing publisher by Asher Benjamin in his Practise of Architecture. Its stained glass windows, gifts of parishioners, were installed between 1892 and 1905, and have been given unproven attributions to several noted stained-glass artists of the period, including John LaFarge and Louis Comfort Tiffany. The congregation was disbanded in 2008, and the building is now owned by the local historical society.

== See also ==
- National Register of Historic Places listings in Hancock County, Maine
