= Thomaston (CDP), Maine =

Thomaston, Maine
- Census-designated place
- Location in Knox County and the state of Maine
- Coordinates: 44°04′49″N 69°10′51″W
- Country: United States
- State: Maine
- County: Knox
- Town: Thomaston

Area
  - Total: 2.16 sq mi (5.60 km^{2})
  - Land: 2.12 sq mi (5.48 km^{2})
  - Water: 0.042 sq mi (0.11 km^{2})
- Elevation: 121 ft (37 m)

Population (2020)
  - Total: 1,836
  - Density: 870/sq mi (335/km^{2})
- Time zone: UTC-5 (Eastern (EST))
  - Summer (DST): UTC-4 (EDT)
- ZIP code: 04861
- Area code: 207
- FIPS code: 23-76330
- GNIS feature ID: 2377961

Thomaston is a census-designated place (CDP) comprising the main village in the town of Thomaston in Knox County, Maine, United States. The population was 1,875 at the 2010 census, out of 2,781 in the town of Thomaston as a whole.

== Geography ==
The Thomaston CDP is located in the southern part of the town of Thomaston, on the north side of the St. George River where it reaches tidewater. U.S. Route 1 comprises Main Street through the village, leading northeast (northbound) 4 miles (6 km) to Rockland and northwest (southbound) 5 miles (8 km) to Warren. Maine State Route 131 follows Route 1 along Main Street but leads northwest up Oyster River Road to the eastern part of Warren and south out High Street five miles to St. George.

According to the United States Census Bureau, the Thomaston CDP has a total area of 2.2 square miles (5.6 km^{2}), of which 2.1 square miles (5.5 km^{2}) are land and 0.04 square miles (0.1 km^{2}), or 1.98%, are water.

== Demographics ==
Historical population
Census	Pop.	Note	%±
2020	1,836		—
U.S. Decennial Census

As of the census of 2000, there were 2,714 people, 1,013 households, and 583 families residing in the CDP. The population density was 1,379.0 inhabitants per square mile (532.4/km^{2}). There were 1,100 housing units at an average density of 558.9 per square mile (215.8/km^{2}). The racial makeup of the CDP was 97.13% White, 0.81% Black or African American, 0.29% Native American, 0.66% Asian, 0.04% Pacific Islander, 0.07% from other races, and 0.99% from two or more races. Hispanic or Latino of any race were 0.55% of the population.

There were 1,013 households, out of which 25.5% had children under the age of 18 living with them, 43.3% were married couples living together, 10.2% had a female householder with no husband present, and 42.4% were non-families. 35.7% of all households were made up of individuals, and 18.8% had someone living alone who was 65 years of age or older. The average household size was 2.25 and the average family size was 2.90.

In the CDP, the population was spread out, with 18.6% under the age of 18, 9.0% from 18 to 24, 31.9% from 25 to 44, 24.7% from 45 to 64, and 15.8% who were 65 years of age or older. The median age was 39 years. For every 100 females, there were 121.7 males. For every 100 females age 18 and over, there were 127.6 males.

The median income for a household in the CDP was $30,549, and the median income for a family was $41,058. Males had a median income of $29,375 versus $22,067 for females. The per capita income for the CDP was $16,564. About 8.1% of families and 14.6% of the population were below the poverty line, including 13.5% of those under age 18 and 17.9% of those age 65 or over.
