= Mosquito Island House =

Historic house in Maine, United States

- U.S. National Register of Historic Places
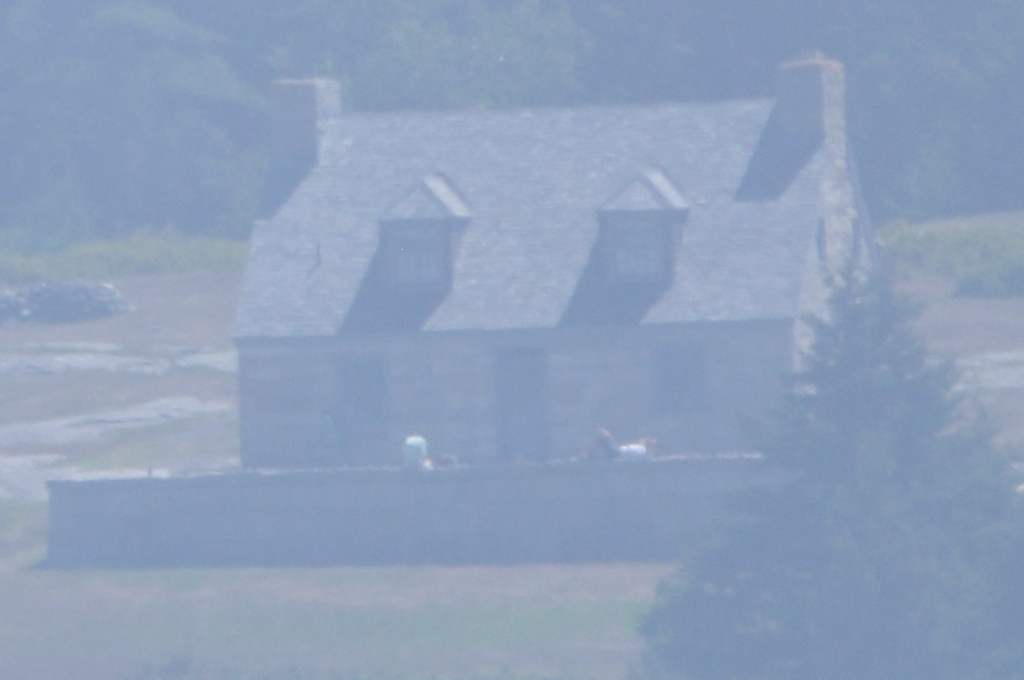

- Location within Maine Location within the United States
- Location: Mosquito Island, St. George, Maine
- Coordinates: 43°55′21″N 69°13′22″W
- Area: 0.5 acres (0.20 ha)
- Built: 1780
- NRHP reference No.: 83000462
- Added to NRHP: September 29, 1983

The Mosquito Island House is a historic house on Mosquito Island, off the southern coast of St. George, Maine in the Gulf of Maine. Probably built in the late 18th century, it is unique in the state as a Cape style house constructed out of granite blocks. The house was listed on the National Register of Historic Places in 1983. The island is private property, owned since 1995 by John Malone, one of Maine's largest landowners.

== Description and history ==
Mosquito Island is located about 2 miles (3.2 km) south of Martinsville and east of Marshall Point, the southernmost tip of the St. George peninsula. The island is about 220 acres (89 ha) in size. The stone house is located in a clearing on the northwestern shore of the island, along with a small cluster of more modern buildings. It is a 1 1/2-story Cape style structure, built out of rough-cut granite and topped by a gabled roof. The front (north-facing) of the roof is pierced by two gabled dormers, which are 20th-century additions. The main facade has two sash windows flanking the main entrance, which is topped by a multilight transom window.

The house's construction date is uncertain. The stone was quarried locally, using a method that went out of common use around 1750, and is distinctively different from more modern methods used in quarrying the stones for an 1830 foundation on the island. The earliest surviving real estate transactions involving the island date to 1785, and the early history of the island is not well documented. The island was purchased in 1995 by John Malone, a billionaire businessman and philanthropist with extensive landholdings in the state, and the house was restored.

== See also ==
- National Register of Historic Places listings in Knox County, Maine
