= West Branch Oyster River =

Location
- Country: United States

Physical characteristics
- Source
  - location: Maine
  - elevation: 170 feet (52 m)
- Mouth
  - location: Oyster River
  - coordinates: 44°07′33″N 69°11′46″W
  - elevation: 90 feet (27 m)
- Length: 3.3 miles (5.3 km)

Basin features
- Progression: Oyster River – St. George River – Muscongus Bay

The West Branch Oyster River is a 3.3-mile-long (5.3 km) tributary of the Oyster River in Warren, Maine. From its source (44°08′57″N 69°12′47″W), the stream runs about 2 miles south and 1 mile east to its confluence with the main stem of the Oyster River.

== See also ==
- List of rivers of Maine
