= Dead River (St. George River tributary) =

Location
- Country: United States

Physical characteristics
- Source
  - location: Maine
  - elevation: 290 feet (88 m)
- Mouth
  - location: St. George River
  - coordinates: 44°22′00″N 69°15′39″W
  - elevation: 275 feet (84 m)
- Length: 3 mi (4.8 km)

The Dead River is a tributary of the St. George River in the U.S. state of Maine. From the outflow of Newbert Pond (44°20′04″N 69°16′29″W) in Appleton, the stream runs 3.1 miles (5.0 km) northeast to its confluence with the St. George River in Searsmont.

== See also ==
- List of rivers of Maine
