= Back River (St. George River tributary) =

Location
- Country: United States

Physical characteristics
- Source
  - location: Maine
  - elevation: 105 feet (32 m)
- Mouth
  - location: St. George River
  - coordinates: 44°09′07″N 69°16′31″W
  - elevation: 30 feet (9.1 m)
- Length: 10.7 mi (17.2 km)

The Back River is a tributary of the St. George River in Knox County, Maine. From its source in Far Meadow (44°02′53″N 69°16′08″W) in Cushing, the river runs 10.7 miles (17.2 km) north, through South and North Ponds, to its confluence with the St. George in Warren.

== See also ==
- List of rivers of Maine
