= Strange Gift =

1951 novel by Adelyn Bushnell

- Author: Adelyn Bushnell
- Language: English
- Publisher: Coward-McCann
- Publication date: 1951
- Publication place: United States
- Media type: Print (hardcover)
- Pages: 309

Strange Gift is a 1951 American supernatural romance novel. It was the fourth and final published novel by Adelyn Bushnell, who was primarily known for her work as a playwright and radio dramatist, before her death two years later.

== Plot ==
Nancy Morse, a young woman who has gained fame as a psychic child prodigy, returns who her hometown of Kincassett, Maine, to settle her family's financial affairs. Despite growing up surrounded by religious and spiritualist charlatans, Nancy does indeed have psychic abilities, both aspects of her reputation that automatically put her at odds with the community. The plot is further driven by a "vision of sudden death in the snow" that comes to Nancy around the same time some New York gangsters arrive in Kincassett.

== Response ==
Strange Gift receive positive reviews upon its release. The Los Angeles Daily News wrote that "Adelyn Bushnell tells her story with a simplicity and conviction that lends a remarkable degree of credibility." Writing in the Raleigh News & Observer, reviewer Becky Summers described it as "best-seller stuff" and told the reader: "you will find that this story of a clairvoyant will hold you spellbound for its full 309 pages." "Plot, characters, transitions are well handled," opined the Tulsa World, "and it all adds up to good reading without any strain on the mentality--unless you choose to take seriously the strange revelations and ponder their truth."

Portland-based reviewer Harold L. Cail wrote that "Strange Gift will hold the interest, even if Nancy's clairvoyancy does become a little too pat at times," and described the ending as disappointing. Ken Carnahan, writing in The Berkeley Daily Gazette, was even less kind to the book, calling it confusing and admonishing the author for being "so concerned with the lives and doing of some of the inhabitants of the small town of Kincassett, Maine, that she neglects the story possibilities of Nancy's gift until almost the end of the book."
