= Connors House =

Historic house in Maine, United States

- U.S. National Register of Historic Places
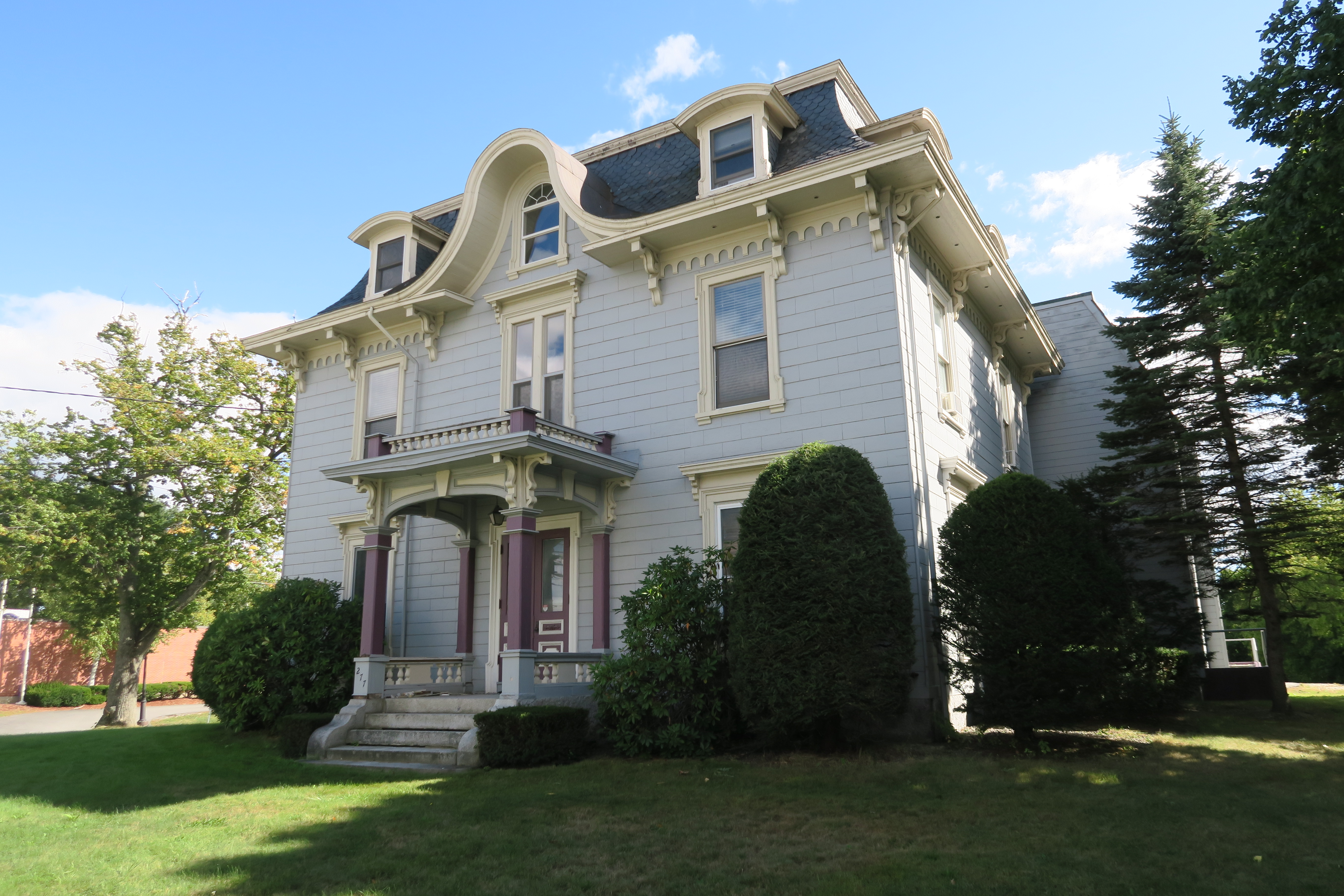

- Location within Maine Location within the United States
- Location: 277 State Street, Bangor, Maine
- Coordinates: 44.8061°N 68.7589°W
- Area: 0.3 acres (0.12 ha)
- Built: 1866
- Architect: Benjamin S. Deane
- Architectural style: Bangor Style
- NRHP reference No.: 83003669
- Added to NRHP: October 6, 1983

The Connors House (also known as a Former Home for Aged Women) is a historic house at 277 State Street in Bangor, Maine. Built about 1866–67, it is a fine example of the "Bangor style" of Second Empire architecture, notable as the last known work of architect Benjamin S. Deane, and as the home of Edward Connors, operator of Bangor's log boom and the city's wealthiest Irish-American. The house was listed on the National Register of Historic Places on October 6, 1983; it now houses professional offices.

== Description and history ==
The house is located east of Bangor's central business district at the southwest corner of State Street (United States Route 2) and Birch Street. It is a rambling three-story wood-frame structure, with a mansard roof that has a flared eave, and matchboard siding treated to resemble stone. At the center of the north-facing front is a broad bellcast dormer, emulating the curve of the mansard roof flare. The eaves are bracketed and dentillated, and windows are topped by bracketed cornices. The front entrance is sheltered by an elaborately decorated porch.

It was built about 1866-67 for Edward Connors, an Irishman who apparently inherited a fortune through his wife, and was the owner and operator of Bangor's log boom, a critical element of the town's booming lumber-based economy of the time. The house was designed by local architect Benjamin S. Deane, and is his last known work. The house is stylistically of a type known as the "Bangor style", and is the only one of the type in the city whose architect is known. The house served for many years as Bangor's Home for Aged Women, resulting in a number of additions, generally sympathetic in style to the original house. The house now houses professional offices.

== See also ==
- National Register of Historic Places listings in Penobscot County, Maine
