= Wheelwright Block =

- U.S. National Register of Historic Places
- U.S. Historic district – Contributing property
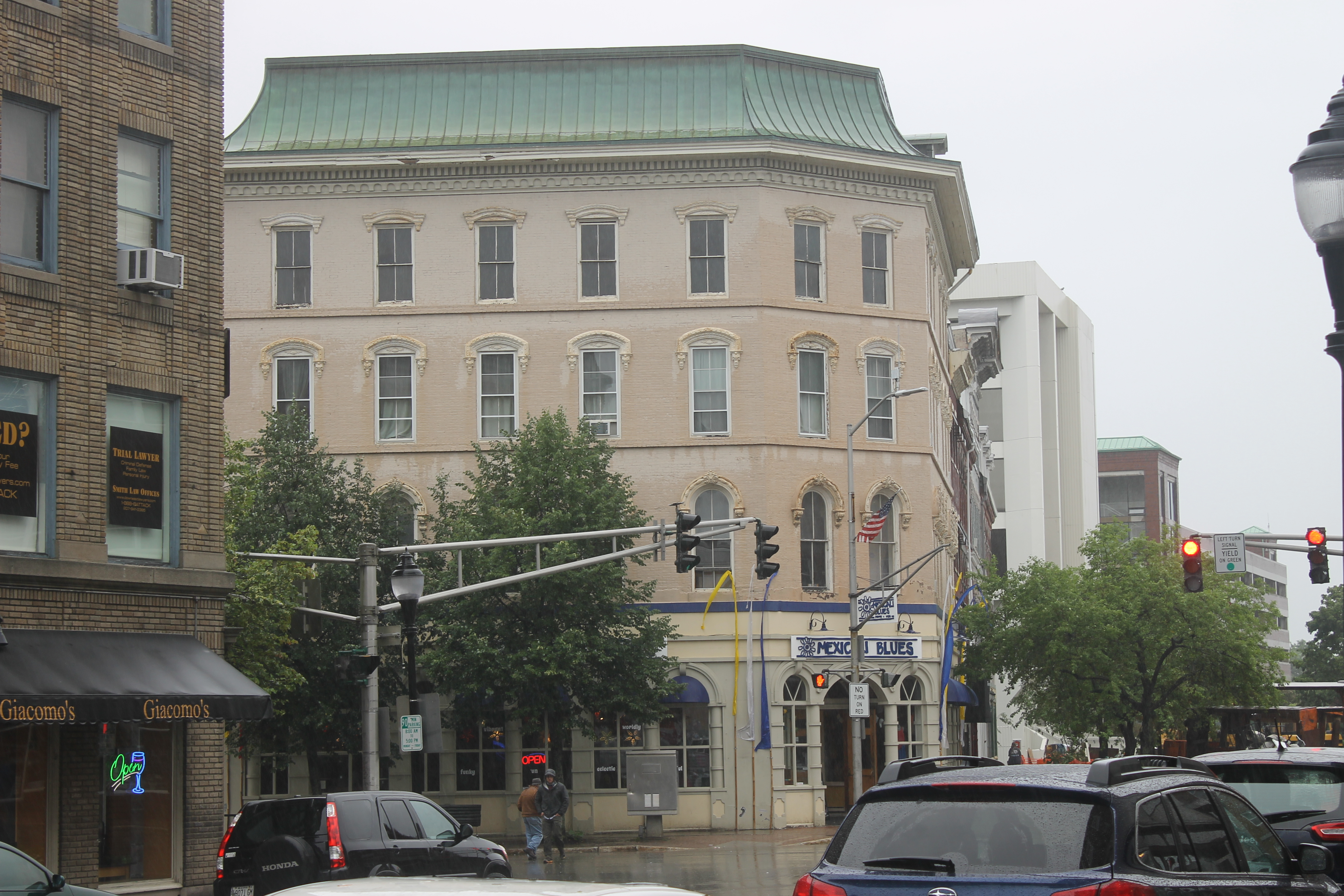

- Location within Maine Location within the United States
- Location: 34 Hammond St., Bangor, Maine
- Coordinates: 44°48′5″N 68°46′16″W
- Area: 1 acre (0.40 ha)
- Built: 1859
- Architect: Benjamin S. Deane
- Architectural style: Second Empire
- Part of: West Market Square Historic District (ID79000161)
- NRHP reference No.: 74000191

Significant dates
- Added to NRHP: July 18, 1974
- Designated CP: December 27, 1979

The Wheelwright Block is a historic commercial building at 34 Hammond Street in Bangor, Maine. Built in 1859, it occupies a central position in the city's West Market Square at the junction of Main, Broad, and Hammond Streets. It was the state's first commercial Second Empire building, and notably survived both Bangor's devastating 1911 fire, and its major urban renewal programs of the late 1960s. It was listed on the National Register of Historic Places in 1974.

== Description and history ==
The Wheelwright Block stands at the northern end of West Market Square, at the southeast corner of the junction of Main Street (United States Route 202) and Hammond Street (United States Route 2). It is four-story brick building, which is roughly L-shaped due to the angled corner lot, with a flared metal mansard roof with no dormers except for a single one facing the square. The floors are set off from one another by bands of projecting brickwork, and each have slightly different window treatment, although the number and arrangement of windows is consistent on the upper floors. The ground floor had mid-20th-century plate glass store fronts at the time of the building's listing on the National Register; this treatment has since been altered to have a reconstruction of the buildings original cast iron arched window frames. The window hoods on the upper floors are all original Italianate cast iron elements, with those on the third floor particularly elaborate.

The building was designed by Benjamin S. Deane, one of a handful of architects working in Maine in the first half of the 19th century, and was completed in 1859. It is believed to be the first commercial Second Empire building in the state, predating such buildings in the larger cities of Lewiston and Portland. It was built for Wheelwright & Clark, a local clothing business. The block survived Bangor's 1911 fire, which destroyed a large number of commercial buildings, and its 1968 urban renewal program, which also resulted in the demolition of a great many 19th-century commercial buildings.

== See also ==
- National Register of Historic Places listings in Penobscot County, Maine
