= Stetson Union Church =

Historic church in Maine, United States

- U.S. National Register of Historic Places
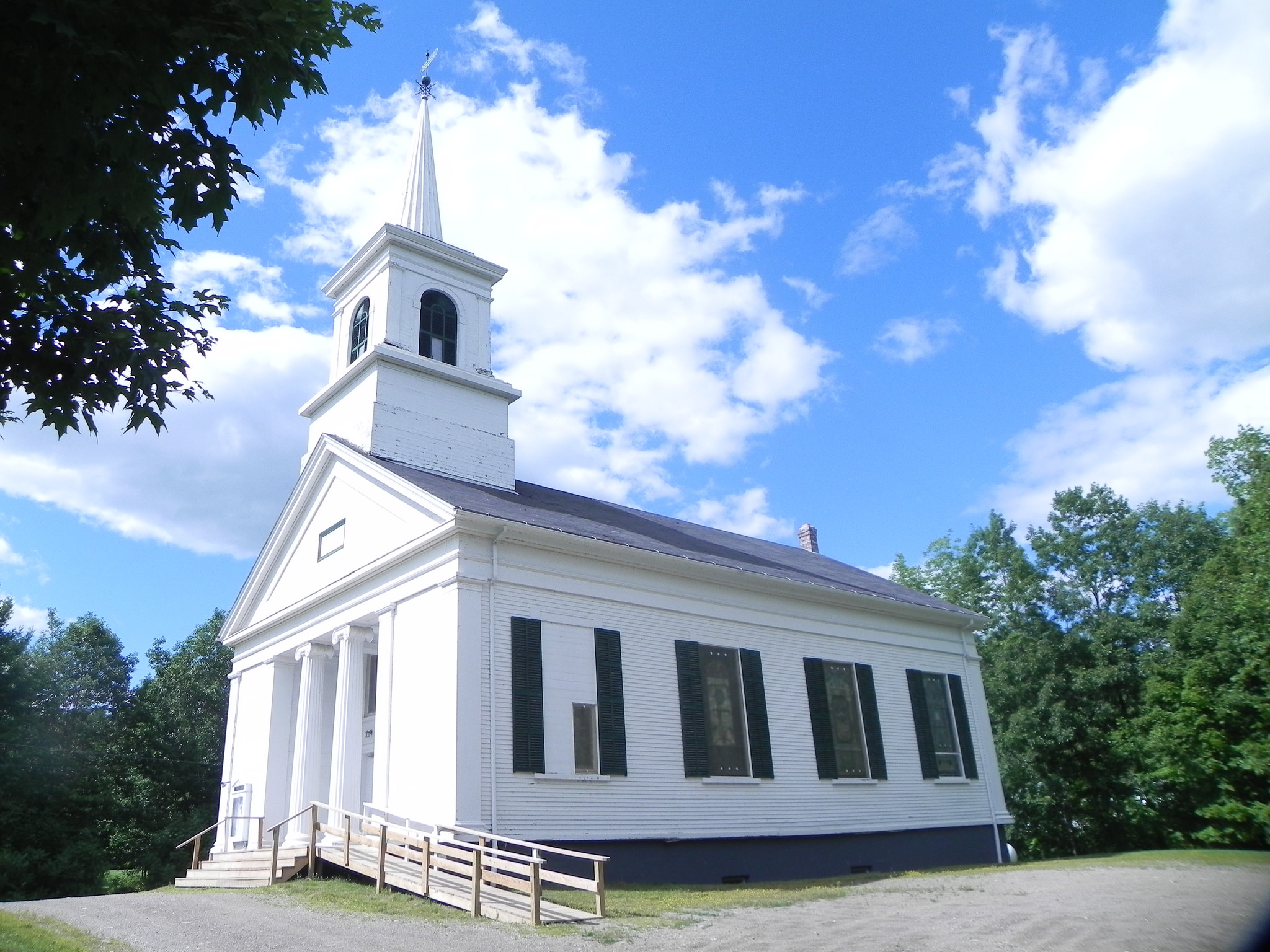

- Location within Maine Location within the United States
- Location: ME 222, Stetson, Maine
- Coordinates: 44°53′35″N 69°8′17″W
- Area: 0.3 acres (0.12 ha)
- Built: 1843
- Architect: Deane, Benjamin S.
- Architectural style: Greek Revival
- NRHP reference No.: 81000068
- Added to NRHP: July 15, 1981

Stetson Union Church, also known as the Stetson Meetinghouse, is a historic church building on Maine State Route 222 in Stetson, Maine. Built in 1843 to a design by Bangor architect Benjamin S. Deane, it is an excellent and well-preserved example of ecclesiastical Greek Revival architecture. The building was listed on the National Register of Historic Places in 1981. It is owned by the town.

== Description and history ==
The Stetson Union Church is located at the northeast corner of Village Road (Maine State Route 222) and Wolfboro Road, east of the village center. The single story rectangular wood frame structure is set facing roughly west, toward the junction. The square tower that rises from the western end of the gable roof has two stages, ending in a conical fluted spire. The upper stage has arched windows flanked by Doric pilasters. The main facade has a recessed entrance pavilion, with Doric columns at the front and Ionic pilasters at the rear. The sides of the building have four stained-glass windows, and a chimney rises at the rear.

The town of Stetson began as a proprietorship established in 1801 by Amasa Stetson on land he purchased from Leicester Academy of Leicester, Massachusetts. In 1831 he bequeathed the funds to build a church, which resulted in the 1843 construction of this building, to a design by the noted Bangor architect Benjamin S. Deane. The building is now owned by the town.

== See also ==
- National Register of Historic Places listings in Penobscot County, Maine
