= Whitehead Island =

Island in St. George, Knox County, Maine, United States

Coordinates: 43°58′48″N 69°07′46″W

Whitehead Island is an island in St. George, Knox County, Maine, United States. Whitehead Light was built on the island in 1807. The island is approximately 70 acres (28 ha) in area and is known for "bleached, rugged granite shores". It is one of the foggiest places on the Maine coast, averaging 80 days of fog a year. Whitehead Lifesaving Station, a property on the National Register of Historic Places is also located on the island.

== See also ==
- List of islands of Maine
