= Weskeag River =

Location
- Country: United States

Physical characteristics
- Source
  - location: Maine
  - elevation: 35 feet (11 m)
- Mouth
  - location: West Penobscot Bay
  - coordinates: 44°02′N 69°07′W
  - elevation: sea level
- Length: 5 miles (8 km)

The Weskeag River is a short tidal river in Knox County, Maine. The Abenaki Indians called it Wessaweskeag, meaning "tidal creek" or "salt creek". From its source (44°04′13″N 69°09′38″W) in South Thomaston, the river runs 1.2 miles (1.9 km) northeast and southeast to its confluence with Marsh Creek, then 4.2 miles (6.8 km) southeast through its estuary to the Muscle Ridge Channel of West Penobscot Bay. Its mouth is on the border between the towns of South Thomaston and Owls Head.

== See also ==
- List of rivers of Maine
