= Adelyn Bushnell =

American dramatist

Adelyn Bushnell Bradford
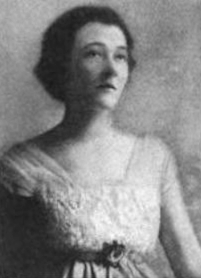
- In the Dramatic Mirror, February 9, 1918
- Born: September 29, 1889; Thomaston, Maine, U.S.
- Died: September 1, 1953 (aged 63); Los Angeles, California, U.S.
- Occupations: Actress, writer
- Spouse: Marshall Bradford (m. 1925)

Adelyn Bushnell Bradford (September 29, 1889 – September 1, 1953) was an American stage actress, playwright, novelist and radio script writer. She was also once a member of the Jefferson Theater Stock Company in Portland.

== Early years ==
Bushnell was born in Thomaston, Maine in 1889. She was home-schooled until she entered high school. In 1908, she graduated from Thomaston High School and enrolled in the Leland Powers School in Boston.

== Career ==
Bushnell joined a New Jersey stock company in 1910 and had her first starring role in a play in 1911. In 1922 she led the Adelyn Bushnell Players at the Jefferson Theater in Portland, Maine. She continued to act in regional stock productions until 1926, when loss of her voice led her to focus on writing.

She began working on plays, then wrote scripts for radio, and later wrote four novels: Tide Rode (1947), Rock Haven (1948), Pay the Piper (1950), and Strange Gift (1951). She also published a collection of radio plays titled Eight Radio Plays: For Classroom Use And Amateur Broadcast with Marshall Bradford (1947).

In the early 1950s, Bushnell wrote books and scripts for radio programs. At the time of her death, she was writing a fifth novel: Drugstore.

== Personal life and death ==
Bushnell divorced William E. Boyden in 1920. She married her fourth husband, Marshall Bradford (née Rafael Brunetto), in October 1925. She died in Hollywood on September 1, 1953.

== Critical response ==
A review of Bushnell's performance in Madam X (1926) in The Boston Globe said,

There were many scenes which those who saw Adelyn Bushnell last night will never forget. She was very realistic in the fortune-telling scene; she was equally convincing as the hopeless old mother and she was Madonna-like in the final reunion with her son. Her expressions were eloquent.
