= Oyster River (Maine) =

Location
- Country: United States

Physical characteristics
- Source
  - location: Maine
  - elevation: 550 feet (170 m)
- Mouth
  - location: St. George River
  - coordinates: 44°04′46″N 69°13′04″W
  - elevation: 7 feet (2.1 m)
- Length: 12.5 mi (20.1 km)

Basin features
- Tributaries
  - left: East Branch Oyster River
  - right: West Branch Oyster River

The Oyster River is a tributary of the St. George River in Knox County, Maine. From its source (44°11′29″N 69°09′42″W) in Rockport, the river runs 12.5 miles (20.1 km) south and southwest to its confluence with the Saint George. Its lower third forms the border between Warren and Thomaston.

== See also ==
- East Branch Oyster River
- West Branch Oyster River
- List of rivers of Maine
