= West Market Square Historic District =

Historic district in Maine, United States

- U.S. National Register of Historic Places
- U.S. Historic district
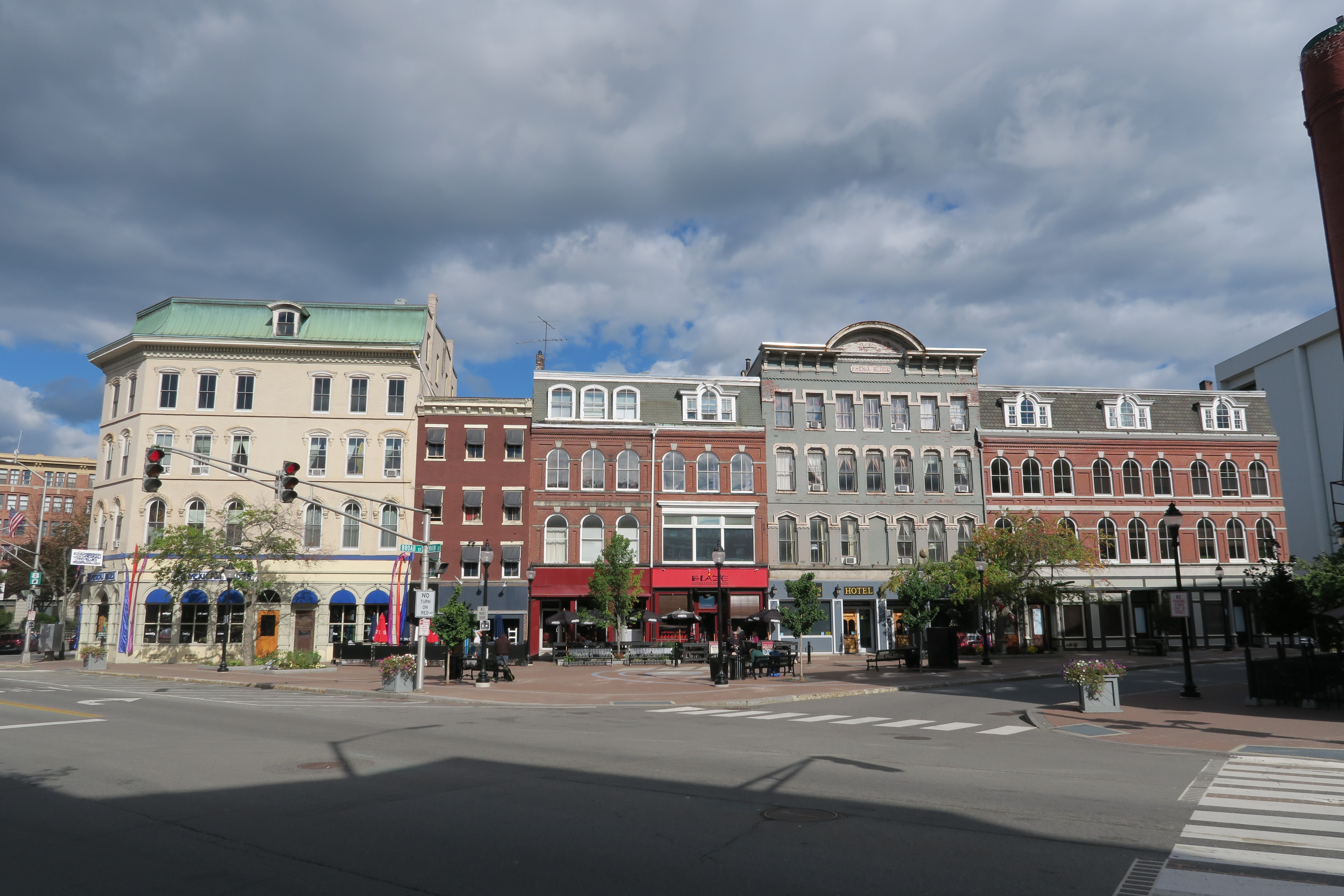
- West Market Square

- Location within Maine Location within the United States
- Location: W. Market Sq., Bangor, Maine
- Coordinates: 44°48′5″N 68°46′17″W
- Area: 1.2 acres (0.49 ha)
- Architect: Newman, Frank E.; Deane, Benjamin S.
- Architectural style: Greek Revival, Late Victorian, Neo-Classical Revival
- NRHP reference No.: 79000161
- Added to NRHP: December 27, 1979

The West Market Square Historic District encompasses one of Bangor, Maine's central urban business districts. Located at the junction of Main and Broad Streets, it has been a focal point of Bangor's economy and business since the city's incorporation in 1834. The district includes seven buildings reflective of its appearance in the late 19th and early 20th centuries; it was listed on the National Register of Historic Places in 1979.

== Description and history ==
When Bangor was incorporated in 1834, the junction of Main and Broad Streets, just west of Kenduskeag Stream, was already known as "Market Square", and was the site of an open-air market. It became known as West Market Square later, to distinguish it from East Market Square, located across Kenduskeag Stream at the junction of Central, Harlow, and Park Streets, which developed later. West Market Square was a central focal point of Bangor's commercial business activity into the 20th century. The east side of the square is lined by six, built between c. 1834 and 1870, with the seventh building in the historic district, the Merrill Trust Company building at 2 Hammond Street, located just off the square to the northeast. It is a Classical Revival structure, designed by New York architect Frank E. Newman and completed in 1907.

The six buildings lining the square were all built before 1870, and are reflective of commercial Victorian architectural styles. Three of the buildings are Second Empire in style, including the individually-listed Wheelwright Block, which anchors the square at the northern end. All of these buildings are brick with stone and wood trim elements, and are four stories in height, except the five-story Wheelwright Block. The oldest building, the E.P. Baldwin Building at 10-12 Broad Street, is the oldest building in the district; it was built sometime before 1843, and is Greek Revival in style.

== See also ==
- National Register of Historic Places listings in Penobscot County, Maine
