= Oyster Pond (Martha's Vineyard) =

Salt pond

- Location within Massachusetts Location within the United States
- Location: Edgartown, Massachusetts
- Coordinates: 41.3638°N 70.5989°W
- Type: Salt Pond
- Basin countries: United States
- Surface area: 208 acres (84 ha)
- Average depth: 6.6 feet (2.0 m)

Oyster Pond is a 208-acre pond located on the Massachusetts island of Martha's Vineyard, in the town of Edgartown. It is located in the 2685-acre watershed by the same name which includes a small area in the town of West Tisbury.
