= Thomaston, Maine =

Town in Maine, United States

- Town
- Thomaston in 2026

- Seal

- Location of Thomaston in Knox County, Maine (left) and the state of Maine (right)
- Coordinates: 44°04′44″N 69°10′57″W
- Country: United States
- State: Maine
- County: Knox
- Villages: Thomaston; Wiley Corners

Area
  - Total: 11.48 sq mi (29.73 km^{2})
  - Land: 10.94 sq mi (28.33 km^{2})
  - Water: 0.54 sq mi (1.40 km^{2})
- Elevation: 92 ft (28 m)

Population (2020)
  - Total: 2,739
  - Density: 250/sq mi (96.7/km^{2})
- Time zone: UTC-5 (Eastern (EST))
  - Summer (DST): UTC-4 (EDT)
- ZIP Code: 04861
- Area code: 207
- GNIS feature ID: 582763
- Website: thomastonmaine.gov

Thomaston, formerly known as Fort St. Georges, Fort Wharf, and Lincoln, is a town in Knox County, Maine, United States. The population was 2,739 at the 2020 census. Noted for its antique architecture, Thomaston is an old port popular with tourists. The town was named after Major General John Thomas.

== History ==
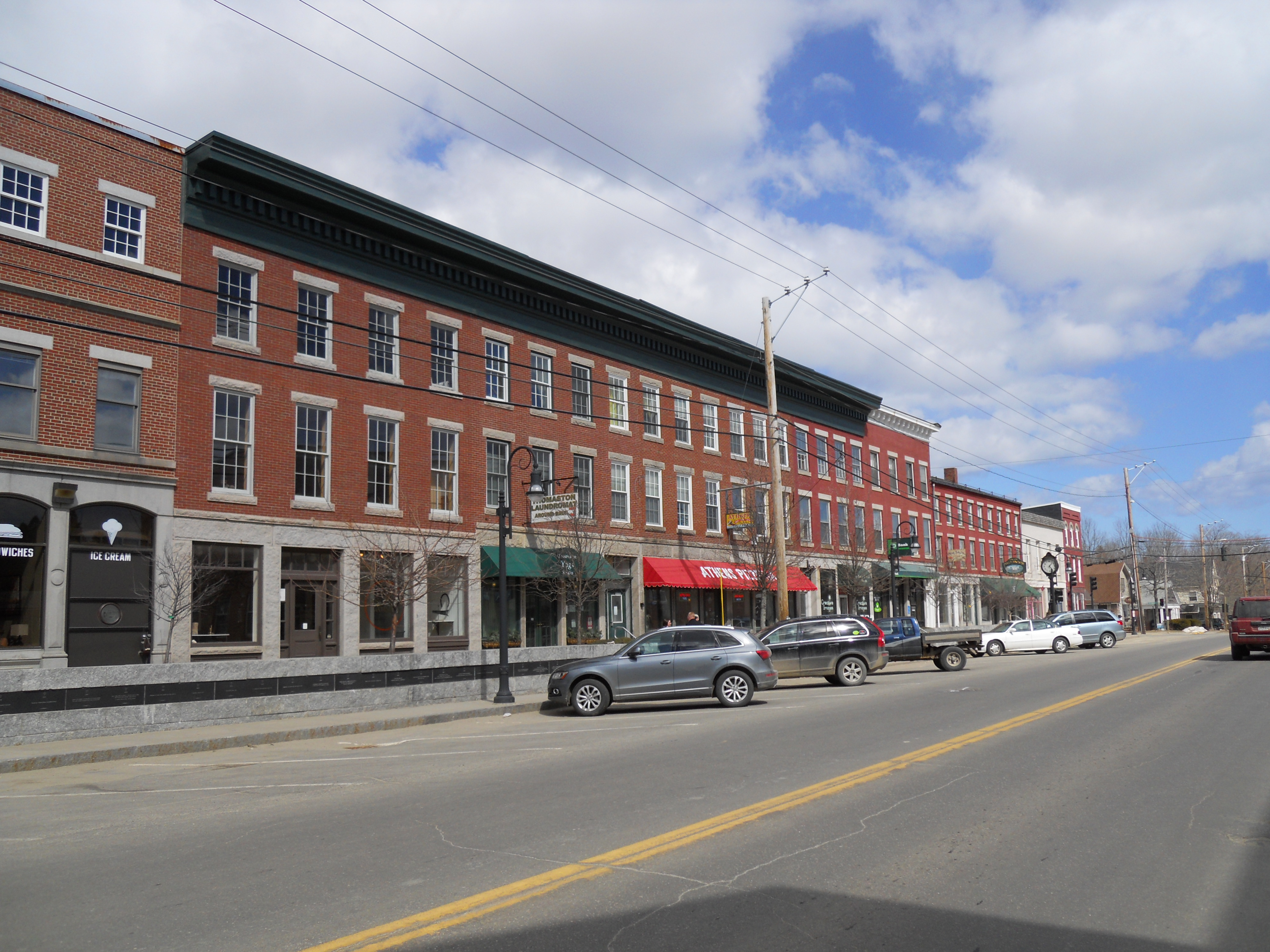
Downtown Thomaston in March 2013

=== 17th century ===
As early as 1630, a trading post was established on the eastern bank of the St. George River, then considered the boundary between New England and New France. In 1704, Thomas LeFebvre from Quebec bought a large tract of land along the Weskeag River on which he built a gristmill, with a house on the shoreline at what is now South Thomaston. Originally called Koessanouskek (or Kouesanouskek) by the French, the area became known as Thomas' Town.

=== 18th century ===
Between 1719 and 1720, the old trading post was remodeled into Fort St. George, a stockaded fort protected by two blockhouses. But Abenaki Indian tribes protested the encroachment of an English fort on their territory. Instigated by the French, they attacked the garrison twice during Dummer's War in 1722, then again in 1723 with a siege lasting 30 days. In response to this and other provocations, soldiers destroyed the Abenaki stronghold of Norridgewock in 1724.

During the French and Indian War, to avenge the fall of Louisbourg, on August 13, 1758, French officer Boishebert left Miramichi, New Brunswick with 400 soldiers for Fort St George in Thomaston. His detachment reached there on September 9 but was caught in an ambush and had to withdraw. This was Boishébert's last Acadian expedition. They then went on to raid Friendship, Maine, where people were killed and others taken prisoner. Hostilities of the French and Indian Wars ceased with the 1759 Fall of Quebec.

Mason Wheaton was the first permanent settler in 1763. Located at the heart of the Waldo Patent, Thomaston was incorporated from St. Georges Plantation on March 20, 1777. Many settlers arrived following the Revolutionary War in 1783. General Henry Knox built his Montpelier mansion at Thomaston in 1793–1794.

=== 19th century ===
The town prospered in the early 19th century as a port and ship building center. Around 1840, two of seven recorded millionaires in the United States were Thomaston sea captains. Other industries included two gristmills, two sawmills and planing mills, three sail lofts, brickyards, cask manufacturing and a marble works. Lime had been manufactured here since 1734 in kilns. Thomaston is still home to Jeff's Marine, Inc. and Lyman Morse Boatbuilding, builders of custom power and sailing yachts. Located on St. George River, Lyman Morse Boatbuilding sits on the original site of the General Henry Knox Mansion, where wooden schooners have been built for over 200 years.

Rockland and South Thomaston were set off and incorporated in 1848. The Knox and Lincoln Railroad passed through the town, carrying freight and tourists.

In June 1875, Louis Wagner, the Smuttynose Axe Murderer, and John True Gordon, known as the Thorndike Slayer, were hanged on the gallows of the then-Maine State Prison in Thomaston. Louis Wagner's burial site was unknown until the book Return to Smuttynose Island: And Other Maine Axe Murders by Emeric Spooner was released in 2009. Spooner located Wagner's grave which can still be viewed in the Old Prison Cemetery.

Thomaston was home to the Maine State Prison until 2002, when it moved to Warren and the former facility was demolished. The prison was locally famous for its shop featuring handmade wares of prisoners and inspired the prison in the film, The Shawshank Redemption. The gift shop still exists today. Former governor William King sold the prison site to the state in 1824. Today, Thomaston is a resort area with a large historic district containing Federal, Greek Revival and Italianate architecture. The town was a filming location for the 1996 film, Thinner.

=== 20th century ===
In 1974, Thomaston Historic District was listed on the National Register of Historic Places.

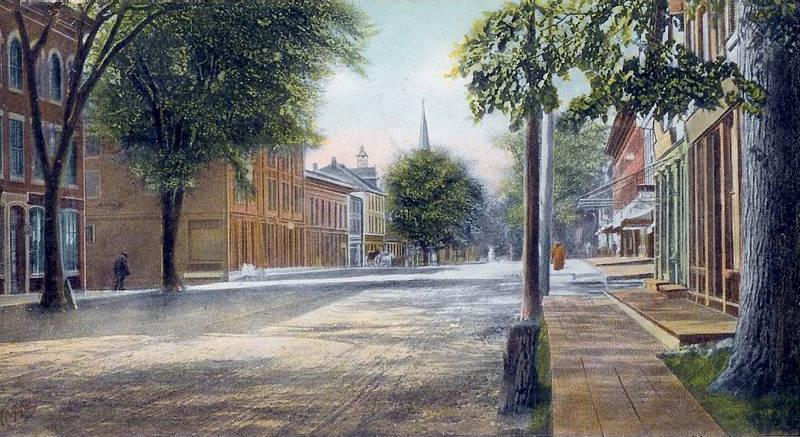
Main Street in 1906

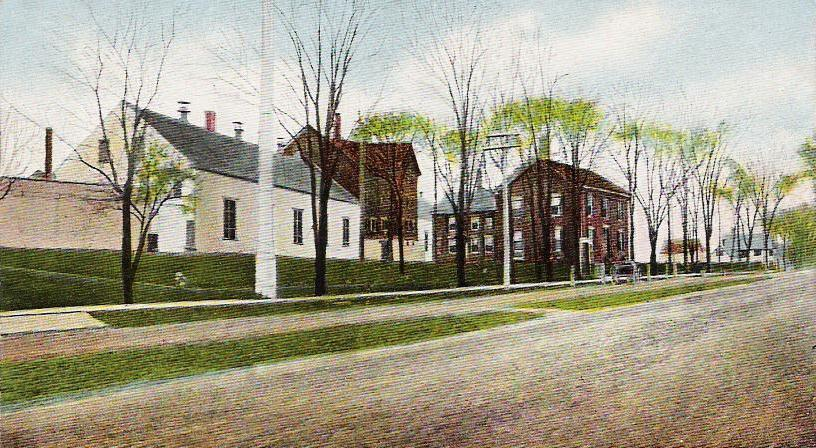
Warden's residence and prison in 1905

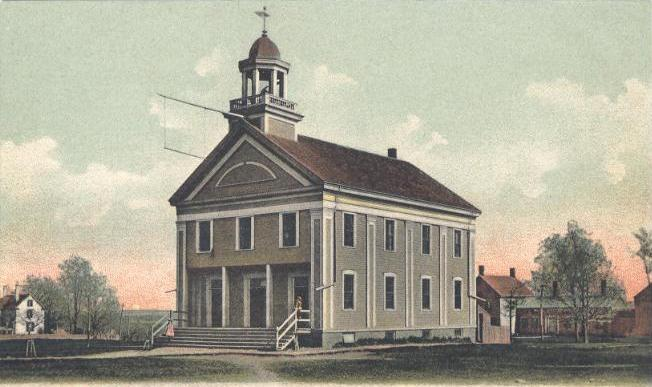
Old High School c. 1905

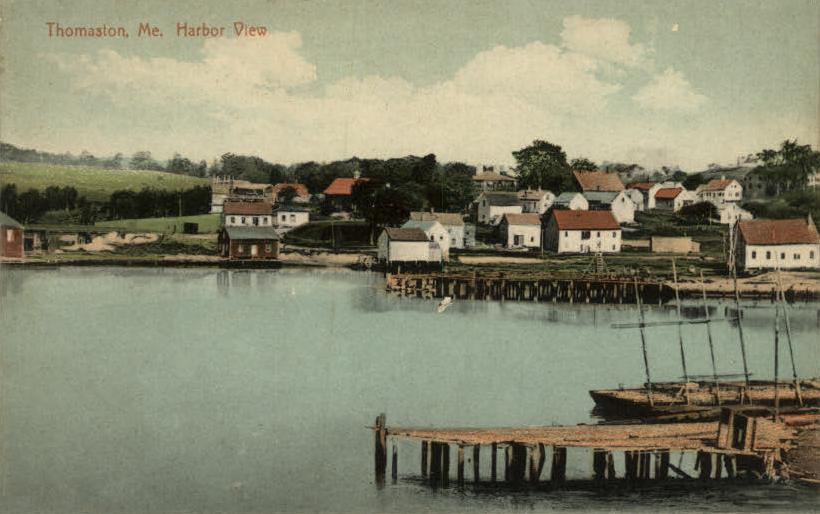
Harbor view in 1908

== Geography ==
According to the U.S. Census Bureau, the town has a total area of 11.48 square miles (29.73 km^{2}), of which 10.94 square miles (28.33 km^{2}) is land and 0.54 square miles (1.40 km^{2}) is water. Thomaston is drained by the St. George River, Weskeag River, Mill River and Oyster Rivers.

The town is crossed by U. S. Route 1 and Maine State Route 131. It is bordered by the towns of Rockland to the northeast, South Thomaston to the south, Cushing to the southwest, and Warren to the northwest.

== Demographics ==
Historical population
Census	Pop.	Note	%±
1790	799		—
1800	1,397		74.8%
1810	2,100		50.3%
1820	2,651		26.2%
1830	4,214		59.0%
1840	6,227		47.8%
1850	2,723		−56.3%
1860	3,218		18.2%
1870	3,092		−3.9%
1880	3,017		−2.4%
1890	3,009		−0.3%
1900	2,688		−10.7%
1910	2,205		−18.0%
1920	2,019		−8.4%
1930	2,214		9.7%
1940	2,533		14.4%
1950	2,810		10.9%
1960	2,780		−1.1%
1970	2,646		−4.8%
1980	2,900		9.6%
1990	3,306		14.0%
2000	3,748		13.4%
2010	2,781		−25.8%
2020	2,739		−1.5%
U.S. Decennial Census

=== 2010 census ===
As of the census of 2010, there were 2,781 people, 1,219 households, and 767 families residing in the town. The population density was 254.2 inhabitants per square mile (98.1/km^{2}). There were 1,385 housing units at an average density of 126.6 per square mile (48.9/km^{2}). The racial makeup of the town was 97.0% White, 0.3% African American, 0.5% Native American, 0.8% Asian, 0.1% from other races, and 1.4% from two or more races. Hispanic or Latino of any race were 0.5% of the population.

There were 1,219 households, of which 28.6% had children under the age of 18 living with them, 45.6% were married couples living together, 13.4% had a female householder with no husband present, 3.9% had a male householder with no wife present, and 37.1% were non-families. 30.4% of all households were made up of individuals, and 14% had someone living alone who was 65 years of age or older. The average household size was 2.25 and the average family size was 2.73.

The median age in the town was 44 years. 21.1% of residents were under the age of 18; 6.7% were between the ages of 18 and 24; 23.4% were from 25 to 44; 30.8% were from 45 to 64; and 18.1% were 65 years of age or older. The gender makeup of the town was 46.9% male and 53.1% female.

== Education ==
It is within the Regional School Unit 13 school district. school district. Schools in the area include:

- Thomaston Grammar School
- Oceanside Middle School

== Fire Department ==
The Fire Department currently runs three pumpers, one ladder truck with a 75' aerial ladder, one utility/brush truck and one ambulance. The Fire Department is an all volunteer service.

== Sites of interest ==
- Maine Watercraft Museum
- Montpelier – General Henry Knox Museum
- Thomaston Historical Society & Museum

== Notable people ==
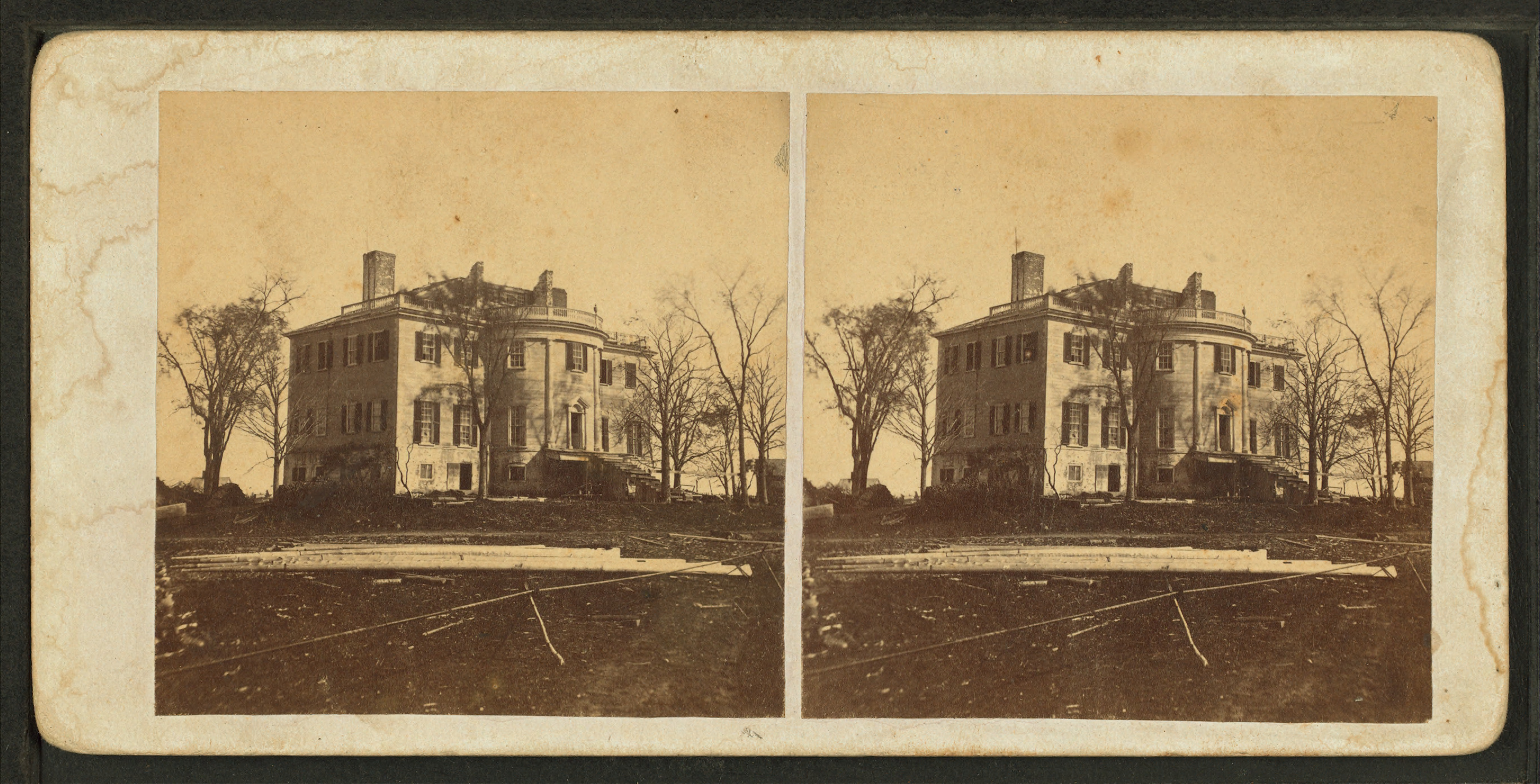
Montpelier, the Gen. Henry Knox mansion (1793–1871) replica built 1929

- Laura Bonarrigo, actress
- Adelyn Bushnell, author
- Jonathan Cilley, U.S. Congressman
- Benjamin S. Deane, architect
- Nathan A. Farwell, businessman and U.S. Senator
- Anna Parker Fessenden, botanist and math educator
- Samuel C. Fessenden, pastor and U.S. Congressman
- Charles Ranlett Flint, businessman, founder of IBM
- Henry Knox, general and U.S. Secretary of War
- Norman Wallace Lermond, political activist and naturalist
- Joshua A. Lowell, U.S. Congressman
- Charles Copeland Morse, businessman
- Chris Rector, Maine state senator
- Edward Robinson, U.S. Congressman
- Daniel Rose, 4th governor of Maine
- John Ruggles, U.S. Senator
- Henry K. Thatcher, Civil War admiral
- Peleg Wadsworth, Revolutionary War-era general
- Oliver Patterson Watts, educator
