= St. George, Maine =

Town in Maine, United States

Saint George, Maine
- Town
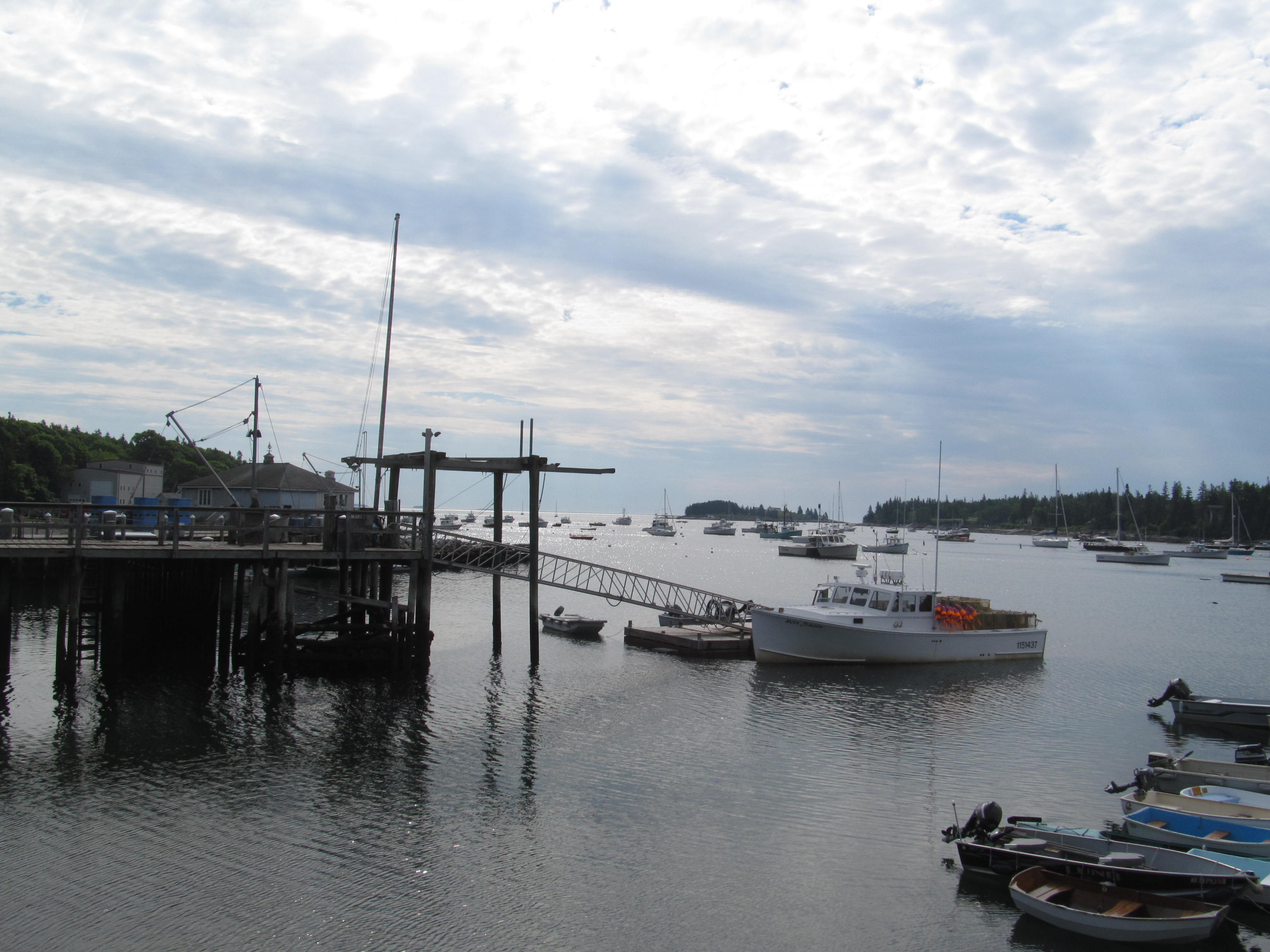
- Tenants Harbor

- Seal

- Location in Knox County and the state of Maine
- Coordinates: 43°54′46″N 69°17′32″W
- Country: United States
- Maine: Maine
- County: Knox
- Incorporated: February 7, 1803
- Villages: St. George; Clark Island; Glenmere; Long Cove; Martinsville; Port Clyde; Spruce Head; Tenants Harbor

Area
  - Total: 117.25 sq mi (303.68 km^{2})
  - Land: 25.02 sq mi (64.80 km^{2})
  - Water: 92.23 sq mi (238.87 km^{2})
- Elevation: 0 ft (0 m)

Population (2020)
  - Total: 2,594
  - Density: 100/sq mi (40/km^{2})
- Time zone: UTC-5 (Eastern (EST))
  - Summer (DST): UTC-4 (EDT)
- ZIP Codes: 04855 (Port Clyde); 04859 (Spruce Head); 04860 (Tenants Harbor)
- GNIS feature ID: 582709
- Website: www.stgeorgemaine.com

St. George or Saint George is a town in Knox County, Maine, United States. It includes the villages of Port Clyde and Tenants Harbor, the town's commercial center. A favorite with artists, writers and naturalists, St. George is home to the Brothers and Hay Ledge nature preserve, comprising four islands off Port Clyde. The town's population stands at 2,594 residents, according to the 2020 Census.

== History ==
The peninsula and its islands were noted for immense flocks of duck, geese and other waterfowl. Although the region was part of the Waldo Patent, General Samuel Waldo complied with requests from Abenaki Indians not to settle immigrants at what was their prized hunting ground. Consequently, the peninsula remained unpopulated until after the close of the French and Indian Wars in 1763. The Revolutionary War further slowed development, but during the 1780s, there was rapid settlement of the peninsula. It was incorporated in 1789 as part of Cushing. On February 7, 1803, the peninsula and its islands were set off and incorporated as St. George, taking its name from the river.

Farmers grew potatoes. After 1830, granite was quarried and shipped nationally for construction. Shipbuilders annually produced three to four vessels, many for the coasting trade, exporting cordwood, lumber and fish. Factories canned lobsters, clams and sardines. In the 1880s, the town's rugged oceanfront beauty was discovered by "rusticators"—visitors, including artists, who bought or built summer cottages.

At the town office, there is a statue of Saint George, the town's namesake, fighting the legendary dragon.

== Geography ==
According to the United States Census Bureau, the town has a total area of 117.25 square miles (303.68 km^{2}), of which 25.02 square miles (64.80 km^{2}) is land and 92.23 square miles (238.87 km^{2}) is water. Bounded on the west by the St. George River, the town is located on a peninsula extending into the Gulf of Maine.

St. George is crossed by state route 131. It borders the town of South Thomaston to the north.

Both Allen Island and Mosquito Island House are listed on the National Register of Historic Places for St. George.

=== Climate ===
Climate data for Tenants Harbor, Maine (1991–2020)
Month	Jan	Feb	Mar	Apr	May	Jun	Jul	Aug	Sep	Oct	Nov	Dec	Year
Mean daily maximum °F (°C)	35.2 (1.8)	36.6 (2.6)	42.5 (5.8)	51.4 (10.8)	60.6 (15.9)	68.7 (20.4)	74.2 (23.4)	74.0 (23.3)	68.2 (20.1)	58.5 (14.7)	49.1 (9.5)	40.6 (4.8)	55.0 (12.8)
Daily mean °F (°C)	26.3 (−3.2)	27.9 (−2.3)	33.9 (1.1)	42.7 (5.9)	51.7 (10.9)	59.4 (15.2)	65.2 (18.4)	65.3 (18.5)	59.8 (15.4)	50.6 (10.3)	41.4 (5.2)	32.5 (0.3)	46.4 (8.0)
Mean daily minimum °F (°C)	17.4 (−8.1)	19.2 (−7.1)	25.4 (−3.7)	33.9 (1.1)	42.7 (5.9)	50.2 (10.1)	56.1 (13.4)	56.6 (13.7)	51.5 (10.8)	42.6 (5.9)	33.7 (0.9)	24.4 (−4.2)	37.8 (3.2)
Average precipitation inches (mm)	4.01 (102)	3.49 (89)	4.50 (114)	4.25 (108)	3.53 (90)	3.83 (97)	3.08 (78)	2.85 (72)	4.01 (102)	4.71 (120)	4.51 (115)	4.83 (123)	47.6 (1,210)
Average snowfall inches (cm)	15.1 (38)	13.9 (35)	8.4 (21)	2.3 (5.8)	0.0 (0.0)	0.0 (0.0)	0.0 (0.0)	0.0 (0.0)	0.0 (0.0)	0.1 (0.25)	2.0 (5.1)	11.3 (29)	53.1 (134.15)
Source: NOAA

== Demographics ==
Historical population
Census	Pop.	Note	%±
1790	578		—
1800	886		53.3%
1810	1,168		31.8%
1820	1,325		13.4%
1830	1,643		24.0%
1840	2,094		27.4%
1850	2,217		5.9%
1860	2,716		22.5%
1870	2,318		−14.7%
1880	2,875		24.0%
1890	2,491		−13.4%
1900	2,206		−11.4%
1910	2,201		−0.2%
1920	1,654		−24.9%
1930	2,108		27.4%
1940	1,550		−26.5%
1950	1,482		−4.4%
1960	1,588		7.2%
1970	1,639		3.2%
1980	1,948		18.9%
1990	2,261		16.1%
2000	2,580		14.1%
2010	2,591		0.4%
2020	2,594		0.1%
U.S. Decennial Census

=== 2010 census ===
As of the census of 2010, there were 2,591 people, 1,204 households, and 768 families residing in the town. The population density was 103.6 inhabitants per square mile (40.0/km^{2}). There were 2,107 housing units at an average density of 84.2 per square mile (32.5/km^{2}). The racial makeup of the town was 98.8% White, 0.2% African American, 0.1% Asian, and 0.8% from two or more races. Hispanic or Latino of any race were 0.5% of the population.

There were 1,204 households, of which 21.0% had children under the age of 18 living with them, 51.9% were married couples living together, 6.6% had a female householder with no husband present, 5.3% had a male householder with no wife present, and 36.2% were non-families. 29.7% of all households were made up of individuals, and 14.3% had someone living alone who was 65 years of age or older. The average household size was 2.15 and the average family size was 2.60.

The median age in the town was 51.7 years. 17.3% of residents were under the age of 18; 4.6% were between the ages of 18 and 24; 17.8% were from 25 to 44; 35.4% were from 45 to 64; and 24.9% were 65 years of age or older. The gender makeup of the town was 48.6% male and 51.4% female.

=== 2000 census ===
As of the census of 2000, there were 2,580 people, 1,119 households, and 757 families residing in the town. The population density was 100.9 inhabitants per square mile (39.0/km^{2}). There were 1,777 housing units at an average density of 69.5 per square mile (26.8/km^{2}). The racial makeup of the town was 98.68% White, 0.16% African American, 0.23% Native American, 0.35% Asian, 0.04% from other races, and 0.54% from two or more races. Hispanic or Latino of any race were 0.23% of the population.

There were 1,119 households, out of which 28.2% had children under the age of 18 living with them, 57.8% were married couples living together, 7.0% had a female householder with no husband present, and 32.3% were non-families. 26.5% of all households were made up of individuals, and 12.4% had someone living alone who was 65 years of age or older. The average household size was 2.31 and the average family size was 2.77.

In the town, the population was spread out, with 22.1% under the age of 18, 4.3% from 18 to 24, 24.5% from 25 to 44, 28.2% from 45 to 64, and 21.0% who were 65 years of age or older. The median age was 44 years. For every 100 females, there were 96.5 males. For every 100 females age 18 and over, there were 93.7 males.

The median income for a household in the town was $41,211, and the median income for a family was $48,162. Males had a median income of $33,929 versus $25,439 for females. The per capita income for the town was $23,272. About 3.8% of families and 8.6% of the population were below the poverty line, including 11.7% of those under age 18 and 7.7% of those age 65 or over.

== Education ==
According to Roy Meservey, the first school in St. George served the children of Samuel Watts in the 1780s. In 1792, four school districts were laid out, and more were created as the town's population grew. At their peak in the late 1800s, there were 18 or 20 schools in St. George. As the population decreased, most of the districts were consolidated, and by the 1950s, only four remained: St. George, Clark's Island, Port Clyde, and Tenants Harbor. In 1957, despite strong public opposition, the St. George, Clark's Island, and Port Clyde schools were all closed. Only Tenants Harbor remained, which all students since have attended under the unified name 'St. George School.' St. George School is a public K–8 school operated by the St. George Municipal School Unit, and has 180 students.

St. George High School was established in 1894 in the sail loft over Long's Store. Its building was erected in 1900, graduating its first class in 1901. It, too, closed as a result of population decline, graduating its last class in 1962. For the 1962–1963 academic year, high school students attended Georges Valley High School in Thomaston. The old building was used as the new elementary school, before being demolished a few years later and replaced by the current town office and fire station.

Starting in the 2015–2016 academic year, St. George students in grades 9–12 began attending one of five schools of their choice:

- Camden Hills Regional High School
- Lincoln Academy
- Medomak Valley High School
- Oceanside High School
- Watershed School

== Notable people ==
- Linda Bean, businessperson and an heiress to the L.L.Bean company
- Albert S. Bickmore, naturalist and founder of the American Museum of Natural History
- Richard Falley Jr. (1740–1808), an ensign at the Battle of Bunker Hill during the American Revolutionary War
- Ann Matlack, American politician
- John G. Roberts, Chief Justice of the US Supreme Court
- Charles Wilbert Snow, 60th governor of Connecticut
- Andrew Wyeth, U.S. artist of the middle 20th century
- Jamie Wyeth, contemporary American painter, son of Andrew Wyeth
