= South Thomaston, Maine =

Town in Maine, United States

- Town
- Seal

- Location in Knox County and the state of Maine
- Coordinates: 44°01′30″N 69°07′32″W
- Country: United States
- State: Maine
- County: Knox
- Incorporated: 1848
- Villages: South Thomaston; Pleasant Beach; Spruce Head; Waterman Beach

Area
  - Total: 17.97 sq mi (46.54 km^{2})
  - Land: 11.44 sq mi (29.63 km^{2})
  - Water: 6.53 sq mi (16.91 km^{2})
- Elevation: 30 ft (9.1 m)

Population (2020)
  - Total: 1,511
  - Density: 130/sq mi (51/km^{2})
- Time zone: UTC-5 (Eastern (EST))
  - Summer (DST): UTC-4 (EDT)
- ZIP code: 04858
- Area code: 207
- FIPS code: 23-72585
- GNIS feature ID: 582739
- Website: souththomaston.me

South Thomaston is a town in Knox County, Maine, United States. The population was 1,511 at the 2020 census. A fishing and resort area, the town includes the village of Spruce Head.

== History ==
Abenaki Indians called it Wessaweskeag, meaning "tidal creek" or "salt creek," a reference to what is now known as the Weskeag River. Thomas Lefebvre from Quebec, Canada owned a huge tract of land at the Weskeag River, where his stay began in 1704. He built a large gristmill, with a house on the shoreline. Although he would eventually return to Quebec, the area retained his name—Thomas' Town. But the adjacent St. George River was the uneasy dividing line between land controlled by New England and New France. Permanent settlement would be delayed by the French and Indian Wars, which ended with the 1763 Treaty of Paris.

In 1767, Wessaweskeag was settled by Elisha Snow, who built a sawmill operated by tidal power. In 1773, Joseph Coombs arrived and built another sawmill nearby, and together they built a gristmill. The village of South Thomaston grew around the mills, which would include three granite polishing machines to process stone cut from the town's numerous quarries. On July 28, 1848, South Thomaston was set off from Thomaston and incorporated as a separate town. Owl's Head would be set off from South Thomaston on July 9, 1921.

== Geography ==
According to the United States Census Bureau, the town has a total area of 17.97 square miles (46.54 km^{2}), of which 11.44 square miles (29.63 km^{2}) is land and 6.53 square miles (16.91 km^{2}) is water. South Thomaston is located on the Weskeag River inlet.

== Demographics ==
Historical population
Census	Pop.	Note	%±
1850	1,420		—
1860	1,615		13.7%
1870	1,693		4.8%
1880	1,771		4.6%
1890	1,534		−13.4%
1900	1,426		−7.0%
1910	1,438		0.8%
1920	947		−34.1%
1930	579		−38.9%
1940	538		−7.1%
1950	654		21.6%
1960	732		11.9%
1970	831		13.5%
1980	1,064		28.0%
1990	1,227		15.3%
2000	1,416		15.4%
2010	1,558		10.0%
2020	1,511		−3.0%
U.S. Decennial Census

The median income for a household in the town was $43,594, and the median income for a family was $55,000. Males had a median income of $38,500 versus $33,125 for females. The per capita income for the town was $24,522. About 6.7% of families and 9.1% of the population were below the poverty line, including 12.3% of those under age 18 and 7.3% of those age 65 or over. Of the 832 people in the labor force only 25 were unemployed as of the 2010 census making the town's unemployment rate 2.9%.

=== 2010 census ===
As of the census of 2010, there were 1,558 people, 674 households, and 442 families residing in the town. The population density was 136.2 inhabitants per square mile (52.6/km^{2}). There were 893 housing units at an average density of 78.1 per square mile (30.2/km^{2}). The racial makeup of the town was 96.8% White, 0.3% African American, 0.4% Native American, 0.8% Asian, 0.1% from other races, and 1.7% from two or more races. Hispanic or Latino of any race were 0.6% of the population.

There were 674 households, of which 25.1% had children under the age of 18 living with them, 52.8% were married couples living together, 7.9% had a female householder with no husband present, 4.9% had a male householder with no wife present, and 34.4% were non-families. 27.3% of all households were made up of individuals, and 11.6% had someone living alone who was 65 years of age or older. The average household size was 2.31 and the average family size was 2.79.

The median age in the town was 47.1 years. 19.6% of residents were under the age of 18; 6.1% were between the ages of 18 and 24; 21.3% were from 25 to 44; 32.5% were from 45 to 64; and 20.5% were 65 years of age or older. The gender makeup of the town was 50.3% male and 49.7% female.

== Site of interest ==
- Wessaweskeag Historical Society
