= St. George River (Maine) =

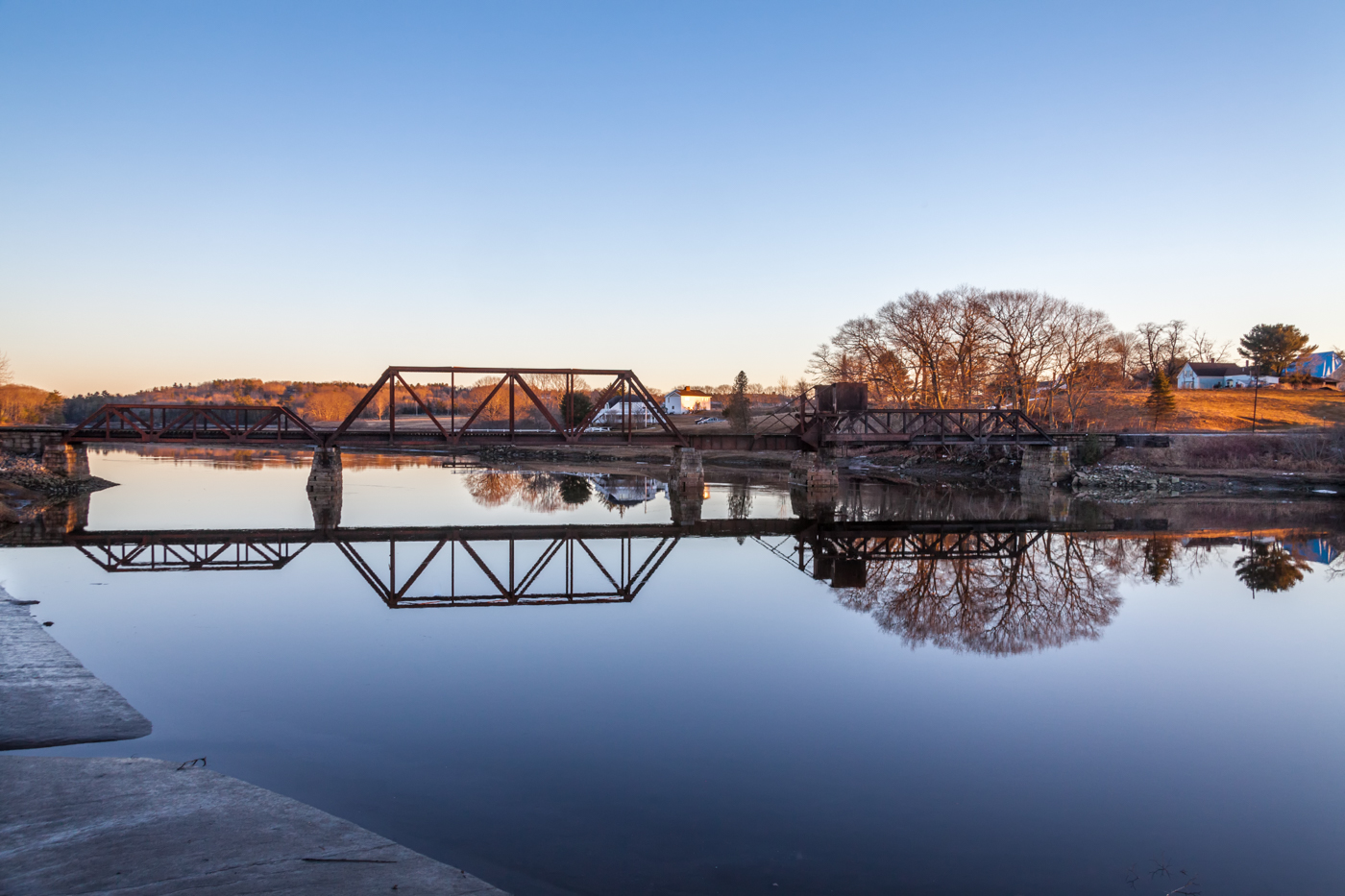
- Maine Eastern Rail Road bridge over the St. George River in Thomaston, ME

Location
- Country: United States

Physical characteristics
- Source
  - location: Maine
  - elevation: 509 feet (155 m)
- Mouth
  - location: Muscongus Bay
  - coordinates: 43°57′N 69°17′W
  - elevation: sea level
- Length: 57 miles (92 km)

Basin features
- Tributaries
  - left: Oyster River, Mill River
  - right: Dead River, Back River

The St. George River is a river in Maine with a watershed of 225 square miles (580 km^{2}) in a unique and historic area of mountains, sea coast, lakes, tidal streams and inlets. The origin of the St. George River is the outflow of St. George Lake (44°23′42″N 69°18′41″W) in Liberty. The river follows a winding course 45 miles (72 km) south to Thomaston, where the river flows into the estuary and runs about 12 miles (19 km) southwest to Muscongus Bay, forming the border between Cushing and St. George.

== Indigenous settlement ==
Paleo-Indians first appeared in the St. George River area about 7,300 BCE. Little is known of Paleo-Indians history in this area.

The Wawenock or Walinakiak Indians resided on the banks of the St. George River at European contact in 1605. The Wawenock Indians were one of four related tribes of the Abenaki, who inhabited central and southeastern Maine. Walinakiak means "People of the bays".

Numbering about 10,000 people in 1500, the Wawenock tribe was decimated by a series of epidemics during the latter 16th century and through the 17th century, falling to about 1,000 people by the end of the American Revolution.

Two members of the Wawenock tribe were captured by Captain Weymouth in 1605, and one Wawenock was returned from England in 1607 aboard either the Gift of God or the John & Mary by the Plymouth Company.

The Wawenock along the St. George’s lived on cultivated products including pumpkins, maize and beans, along with fish, shellfish and game. A large Wawenock shellfish midden at Damariscotta dates back 2,200 years. Captain Weymouth observed this midden in 1605.

== European settlement ==
George Weymouth, captain of the Archangel, made the first documented European landfall at Monhegan Island on the lower estuary of the St. George River on May 17, 1605. On June 11, 1605, Weymouth led an overnight exploration from Monhegan Island which resulted in the identification of “a most excellent river”, which Weymouth named the St. George.

In 1606 and 1607 the Plymouth Company sent ships into the area to colonize, but the settlers of the Popham Colony and those who settled along the Kennebec River returned to England in 1608. 127 years would pass before the first permanent European settlers came to live along the St. George River. In 1630 John Leverett of Boston sent five traders to establish a trading post in the St. George estuary 5 miles (8 km) below “the head of the tide”. The trading post lasted a number of years, falling to one of the various Indian wars by 1650.

In 1735, Samuel Waldo of Boston, having acquired most of the land at the mouth of the St. George River, encouraged 35 families to settle the area now known as St. George, thus creating the first permanent European settlement on the river. By 1760, 175 families lived along the estuary.

== See also ==
- List of rivers of Maine

== Bibliography ==
- Gould, Albert T., The St. George’s River, Athoensen Press, Portland, ME, 1950
