= World's End =

World's End or Worlds End may refer to:

== Arts and entertainment ==
=== Literature ===
==== Novels ====
- World's End (Boyle novel), a 1987 novel by T. Coraghessan Boyle
- World's End (Chadbourn novel), a 2000 novel by Mark Chadbourn
- World's End (Sinclair novel), a 1940 novel by Upton Sinclair
- World's End, the third and final book in the Phoenix Rising trilogy
- The World's End series, four children's novels (1970-1973) by Monica Dickens

==== Short story ====
- The World's End (short story), a 1927 short story by Agatha Christie

==== Comics ====
- "World's End" (comics), a 2008–2009 comic book crossover storyline in the Wildstorm Universe
- World's End (manga), a sequel to Dear Myself by Eiki Eiki
- The Sandman: Worlds' End, part of the DC comic book series The Sandman

=== Television ===
- "World's End" (Cold Case), a television episode
- "World's End", first episode of the 1964 Doctor Who serial The Dalek Invasion of Earth
- "World's End" (Agents of S.H.I.E.L.D.)

=== Film ===
- The World's End (film), a 2013 British science fiction comedy film directed by Edgar Wright and starring Simon Pegg
- Pirates of the Caribbean: At World's End, a 2007 film
- Ved verdens ende (At World's End), a 2009 Danish action comedy film

=== Other ===
- AEW Worlds End, an annual pay-per-view event produced by All Elite Wrestling

== Places ==
=== Australia ===
- Worlds End, South Australia, a locality
- Worlds End Highway, a road in South Australia

=== Norway ===
- Verdens Ende (World's End), at the tip of Tjøme Island, southern Norway

=== Sri Lanka ===
- World's End, Sri Lanka, a sheer precipice with a 1050 m drop in the highlands of Sri Lanka; see Horton Plains National Park

=== United Kingdom ===
- World's End, Berkshire, a village in Berkshire
- World's End, Buckinghamshire
- World's End, West Sussex, the name of a northern area of Burgess Hill
- World's End, Kensington and Chelsea, district of Chelsea, London at the end of Kings Road
- World's End, Denbighshire, an area in the Eglwyseg valley north of Llangollen, Wales
- World's End, Enfield, an area in the London Borough of Enfield between Enfield Town and Oakwood
- Worlds End, Hampshire
- Worlds End, Solihull, see list of areas in Solihull

=== United States ===
- World's End (Hingham), a park and conservation area in Hingham, Massachusetts
- Worlds End State Park, Pennsylvania

== Buildings ==
- The World's End, Camden, a pub in Camden Town, London, England
- The World's End, Chelsea, a pub in Chelsea, London, England
- The World's End, Fraserburgh, listed building
- World's End Inn, a former use of Grove House, Harrogate, England
- World's End, a pub in Edinburgh, Scotland, associated with the World's End Murders
- World's End, a boutique shop on Kings Road, London, originally the Sex boutique by Vivienne Westwood and Malcolm McLaren

== See also ==
- End of the world (disambiguation)
- Land's End (disambiguation)
