= Land's End (disambiguation) =

Land's End is a headland on the Penwith peninsula, located near Penzance in Cornwall, England, United Kingdom.

Lands' End is an American clothing retailer.

Land's End, Lands End, or Lands' End may also refer to:

== Places ==
=== United States ===
- Land's End Plantation (Scott, Arkansas), listed on the National Register of Historic Places (NRHP)
- Lands End, San Francisco, a park in San Francisco, California
- Land's End Observatory, Whitewater, Colorado, NRHP-listed
- Land's End Plantation (Stonewall, Louisiana), NRHP-listed
- Land's End (Hertford, North Carolina), a plantation house in the NRHP
- Lands End, Naxera, Virginia, in the National Register of Historic Places listings in Gloucester County, Virginia
- Lands End Road Tabby Ruins, Frogmore, South Carolina, in the National Register of Historic Places listings in Beaufort County, South Carolina
- Land's End Wildlife Management Area, a protected area located in King George County, Virginia
- Land's End, Newport, Rhode Island, summer cottage of Edith Wharton
- Land's End Historic District, a historic district in St. George, Maine, NRHP-listed

=== Other places ===
- Land's End, Bandra, Mumbai, Maharashtra, India
- El Arco de Cabo San Lucas or Lands End, Cabo San Lucas, Mexico
- Cape Finisterre (Fisterra or Finisterra : Latin for Land's End), headland in Galicia, northwest Spain, the southern landfall of the Bay of Biscay
  - Fisterra (comarca), comarca (county) in A Coruña, Galicia
    - Fisterra, municipality in the comarca
- Finistère, department of France, the northern landfall of the Bay of Biscay
- Kanyakumari, the southernmost town in mainland India, it is sometimes referred to as 'The Land's End'.
- Land's End Airport, in Cornwall, United Kingdom

== Art, entertainment, and media ==
- Land's End (album), a 1974 album by Jimmy Webb
- "Lands End", a jazz standard originally performed on the 1955 album Study in Brown by the Max Roach Quintet
- Land's End (novel), a 1988 novel by Jack Williamson and Frederik Pohl
- Land's End (play), a 1935 play by F. L. Lucas
- Land's End (TV series), a 1995 television series starring Fred Dryer
- Land's End (video game), a 2015 puzzle video game by Ustwo
- The Birds II: Land's End (1994), a horror film

== See also ==
- Finisterre (disambiguation)
- Land's End Plantation (disambiguation)
- World's End (disambiguation)
