= Postpositive adjective =

Adjective that occurs immediately after the noun or pronoun that it complements

A postpositive adjective or postnominal adjective is an adjective that is placed after the noun or pronoun that it modifies, as in noun phrases such as attorney general, queen regnant, or all matters financial. This contrasts with prepositive adjectives, which come before the noun or pronoun, as in noun phrases such as red rose, lucky contestant, or busy bees.

In some languages (Spanish, Welsh, Indonesian, etc.), the postpositive placement of adjectives is the normal syntax, but in English it is largely confined to archaic and poetic uses (e.g., "Once upon a midnight dreary", as opposed to "Once upon a dreary midnight") as well as phrases borrowed from Romance languages or Latin (e.g., heir apparent, aqua regia) and certain fixed grammatical constructions (e.g., "Those anxious to leave soon exited").

In syntax, postpositive position is independent of predicative position; a postpositive adjective may occur either in the subject or the predicate of a clause, and any adjective may be a predicate adjective if it follows a copular verb. For example: monsters unseen were said to lurk beyond the moor (postpositive attribute in subject of clause), but the children trembled in fear of monsters unseen (postpositive attribute in predicate of clause) and the monsters, if they existed, remained unseen (predicate adjective in postpositive position).

Recognizing postpositive adjectives in English is important for determining the correct plural for a compound expression. For example, because martial is a postpositive adjective in the phrase court-martial, the plural is courts-martial, the suffix being attached to the noun rather than the adjective. This pattern holds for most postpositive adjectives, with the few exceptions reflecting overriding linguistic processes such as rebracketing.

== Occurrence in languages ==
In certain languages, including French, Italian, Spanish, Portuguese, Hebrew, Romanian, Arabic, Persian, and Vietnamese, postpositive adjectives are the norm: it is normal for an attributive adjective to follow, rather than precede, the noun it modifies. The following example is from Italian, French and Spanish:

- il cavallo bianco, le cheval blanc, el caballo blanco;
  - translation: "the white horse"
  - literal translation: "the horse white"

In particular instances, however, such languages may also feature prepositive adjectives. In French, certain common adjectives, including grand ("big"), usually precede the noun:

- le grand cheval – "the big horse";

while in Italian and Spanish they can be prepositive or postpositive adjectives:

- il grande cavallo – "the big horse", or
- il cavallo grande – "the big horse", "the horse big";

and

- el gran caballo – "the big horse", or
- el caballo grande – "the big horse", "the horse big".

When an adjective can appear in both positions, the precise meaning may depend on the position. E.g. in French:

- un grand homme – "a great man"
- un homme grand – "a tall man"
- une fille petite – "a small girl"
- une petite fille – "a little girl"
- un petit chien – "a little dog (of a small breed)"
- un chien petit – "a small dog (for its breed)"

And in Spanish:

- un gran hombre – "a great man"
- un hombre grande – "a bulky man"
- una niña pequeña – "a small girl"
- una pequeña niña – "a little girl"
- un pequeño perro – "a little dog (of a small breed)"
- un perro pequeño – "a small dog (for its breed)"

Prepositive and postpositive adjectives may occur in the same phrase:

- un bon vin blanc; un buon vino bianco; un buen vino blanco – "a good white wine"

In many other languages, including English, German, Russian, Japanese, Chinese, and Tagalog, prepositive adjectives are the norm (attributive adjectives normally come before the nouns they modify), and adjectives appear postpositively only in special situations, if at all.

== In modern English ==
=== General uses ===
==== Compulsory ====
Adjectives must appear postpositively in English when they qualify almost all compound and some simple indefinite pronouns: some/any/no/every...thing/one/body/where, those; Examples: We need someone strong; those well-baked; Going anywhere nice?; Nothing important happened; Everyone new was shocked.

All adjectives are used postpositively for qualifying them precisely. The user follows the set formula:

(optional preposition)	(a if singular)	noun	this	adjective	. (or verb/preposition and continuation)

This can be replaced by that or so, or, casually to evoke an affected air, yea. Without the preposition the formula is even more intuitive in replies. Examples pointing: "Which of the greyhounds do you like?" "Dogs this big." "A dog that weighty would definitely fit the bill." "A dog that tall to match my friend's." Examples figuratively: "A dog so fast it could win at the track".

==== Optional ====
Generally to these scenarios:

1. When it is wished to modify adjectives using an adjective phrase in which the head adjective is not final. Such phrases are common in speaking and in writing save for the reflexive which is a bit stark but common in fiction. Examples: (noun/pronoun)...anxious to leave, proud/full of themselves. Comparative forms are positioned before/after the noun, as in we need a box bigger than......a bigger box than... Set compounds and near variations. technology easy-to-use; easy-to-use technology; fruit ripe for (the) picking; ripe-for-picking fruit. The postpositive holds more sway for many of the briefest and simplest of such phrases (e.g. in hand). Examples: job in hand; task underway; a case in point
2. Followed by verbs in the infinitive form for some adjectives, mainly as to size, speed, emotions and probability. Examples: Officers ready to be deployed...Passengers happy to leave...Tourists sad to leave...Team ecstatic with their performance...Solutions likely to work...City large enough...Rocket fast enough; can precede equally if compounded with hyphens. Example: We need numbers of ready-to-deploy officers.

Frequently used noun — more usually in plural form	adjective	infinitive of verb (i.e. to...)

The optional positions apply to the debatable pronoun and near synonym pairs any way/anyhow, some way/somehow, as well as to (in) no way, in every way. Examples: It was in some way(s) good; it was good in some ways; it was good somehow; it was somehow good.

Certain adjectives are used fairly commonly in postpositive position. Present and past participles exhibit this behavior, as in all those entering should ..., one of the men executed was ..., but at will this can be considered to be a verbal rather than adjectival use (a kind of reduced relative clause). Similar behavior is displayed by many adjectives with the suffix -able or -ible (e.g. the best room available, the only decision possible, the worst choice imaginable, the persons liable). Certain other adjectives with a sense similar to those in the foregoing categories are customarily found postpositively (all the people present, the first payment due). Their antonyms (absent and undue) and variations of due (overdue, post-due) can be placed in either position. These two words are among the least varied from the original Anglo-Norman and Old French terms, reflected in modern French, themselves all close to common Latin original forms. A third is used in locating places and in mainly dated use for complex objects: Sweden/the village/town/city proper...operating on the heart proper, it means "more narrowly defined", or "as more closely matches its character".

Adjectives may undergo a change of meaning when used postpositively. Consider the following examples:

1. Every visible star is named after a famous astronomer.
2. Every star visible is named after a famous astronomer.

The postpositive in the second sentence is expected to refer to the stars that are visible here and now; that is, it expresses a stage-level predicate. The prepositive in the first sentence may also have that sense, but it may also have an individual-level meaning, referring to an inherent property of the object (the stars that are visible in general). Quite a significant difference in meaning is found with the adjective responsible:

1. Can you direct me to the responsible people?
2. Can you direct me to the people responsible?

Used prepositively, can you direct me to the responsible people?, it strongly connotes "dedicated" or "reliable", and by use of the heavily conditional "should be" it denotes that, otherwise, as in the second sentence, it denotes the far more commonly used meaning in the 21st century of "at fault" or "guilty" unless the qualifying word for is added.

=== Set phrases ===
There are many set phrases in English which feature postpositive adjectives. They are often loans or loan translations from foreign languages that commonly use postpositives, especially French (many legal terms come from Law French). Some examples appear below:

- In culinary arts with foods, drinks, and recipes: spaghetti bolognese; chicken korma, satay, or supreme; whiskey neat;
- In Christianity and translations of similar Abrahamic religious concepts: Christ/love/life everlasting, the devil/evil incarnate, God Almighty
- In law: actus reus and mens rea, court-martial, fee simple, force majeure, locus classicus, malice aforethought (also malice prepense), persona non grata
- In some set phrases: battle royal, body corporate, body politic, corporation sole, date certain, fee tail, heir apparent, heir presumptive, knight errant, letters patent, letters testamentary, persons unknown, pound sterling, proof positive, times/centuries past, trip the light fantastic, time immemorial, treasure trove
- In professional or honorary titles: ambassador-designate, bishop emeritus, pope emeritus, professor emeritus, attorney general, consul general, governor general, postmaster general, surgeon general, astronomer royal, princess royal, airman basic, minister plenipotentiary, minister-president, notary public, poet laureate, president-elect, prime minister-designate, prince regent, secretary-general, sergeant major, queen consort, queen regnant, prince consort, directorate-general, director-general, etc.
- In heraldry: with the words "dexter" and "sinister" (as in bend dexter, bend sinister), and several referring to attitude, as in eagle displayed, lion passant guardant, griffin rampant, phoenix rising, bird vigilant, etc.
- In certain set names of organizations: Alcoholics Anonymous, Amnesty International, Archive Global, Church Universal and Triumphant, Generation Next, Japan Airlines Domestic, Ruritan National, Situationist International, Socialist International, Weather Underground, Workers United
- In hospital emergency codes: Code Amber, Code Black, Code Orange, Code Red
- Regnal numbers and other appellations, usually including the definite article before the adjective: Henry the Eighth, Elizabeth the Second, Alexander the Great, Ethelred the Unready, Nero Redivivus etc. Note also the generational titles Junior and Senior used to distinguish namesake parents and children.
- In terms kept in the original French language: agent provocateur, cause célèbre, femme fatale
- In mathematics, the analysis terms limes superior and limes inferior

=== Set adjectives ===
Certain individual adjectives, or words of adjectival type, are typically placed after the noun. Their use is not limited to particular noun(s). Those beginning a before an old substantive word can be equally seen as adverbial modifiers (or nouns/pronouns), intuitively expected to be later (see below).

- à gogo — as in "fun and games à gogo"
- ablaze — as in "buildings ablaze"
- abreast — as in "two penguins abreast"
- akimbo— as in "arms akimbo"
- aplenty — as in "food aplenty"
- emeritus — as in "a bishop emeritus"
- extraordinaire — as in "athlete extraordinaire"
- galore — as in "roses and tulips galore"
- incarnate — as in "demons incarnate"
- junior/Jr. (when used as a name suffix) — as in "Martin Luther King Jr."
- manqué/manquée — as in "a hero manqué"
- regnant — as in "the queen regnant"
- redivivus — as in "Emperor Nero redivivus"
- redux — as in "the Cold War redux"
- senior/Sr. or (when used as a name suffix) — as in "Barack Obama Sr."

=== Archaic and poetic usage ===
Phrases with postpositive adjectives are sometimes used with archaic effect, as in things forgotten, words unspoken, dreams believed, Flame Imperishable. Phrases which reverse the normal word order are quite common in poetry, usually to fit the meter or rhyme, as with "fiddlers three" (from Old King Cole) or "forest primeval" (from Evangeline), though word order was less important in Early Modern English and earlier forms of English. Similar examples exist for possessive adjectives, as in "O Mistress Mine" (a song in Act II, Scene 3 of Shakespeare's Twelfth Night).

=== Titles of works ===
Titles of books, films, poems, songs, etc. commonly feature nouns followed by postpositive adjectives. These are often present or past participles (see above), but other types of adjectives sometimes occur. Examples: Apocalypse Now Redux, "Bad Moon Rising", Body Electric, Brideshead Revisited, Chicken Little, Chronicle of a Death Foretold, A Dream Deferred, Hannibal Rising, Hercules Unchained, House Beautiful, Jupiter Ascending, The Life Aquatic, The Light Fantastic, A Love Supreme, The Matrix Reloaded, Monsters Unleashed, Orpheus Descending, Paradise Lost, Paradise Regained, Prometheus Unbound, "The Road Not Taken", Sonic Unleashed, To a God Unknown, Tarzan Triumphant, Time Remembered, The World Unseen, Enemy Mine.

=== Other postpositive noun modifiers ===
Nouns may have other modifiers besides adjectives. Some kinds of modifiers tend to precede the noun, while others tend to come after. Determiners (including articles, possessives, demonstratives, etc.) come before the noun. Noun adjuncts (nouns qualifying another noun) also generally come before the nouns they modify: in a phrase like book club, the adjunct (modifier) book comes before the head (modified noun) club. By contrast, prepositional phrases, adverbs of location, etc., as well as relative clauses, come after the nouns they modify: the elephant in the room; all the people here; the woman to whom you spoke. (These remarks apply to English syntax; other languages may use different word order. In Chinese, for example, virtually all modifiers come before the noun, whereas in the Khmer language they follow the noun.)

Sometimes a noun with a postpositive modifier comes to form a set phrase, similar in some ways to the set phrases with postpositive adjectives referred to above (in that, for example, the plural ending will normally attach to the noun, rather than at the end of the phrase). Some such phrases include:

- With a noun followed by a prepositional phrase: mother-in-law, etc.; editor-in-chief, right of way, president pro tempore (where pro tempore is a Latin prepositional phrase), fish filet deluxe (where de luxe is a French prepositional phrase)
- With an infinitive verb or a verb phrase: father-to-be, bride-to-be, etc.; Johnny-come-lately
- With an adverbial particle from a phrasal verb: passer-by, hanger-on

In some phrases, a noun adjunct appears postpositively (rather than in the usual prepositive position). Examples include Knights Hospitaller, Knights Templar, man Friday (or girl Friday, etc.), airman first class (also private first class, sergeant first class), as well as many names of foods and dishes, such as Bananas Foster, beef Wellington, broccoli raab, Cherries Jubilee, Chicken Tetrazzini, Crêpe Suzette, Eggs Benedict, Oysters Rockefeller, peach Melba, steak tartare, and duck a l'orange.

Identifying numbers (with or without the word number), and sometimes letters, appear after the noun in many contexts. Examples are Catch-22; warrant officer one, chief warrant officer two, etc.; Beethoven's Symphony No. 9; Call of Duty Three, Rocky Four, Shrek the Third, Generation X. (For appellations such as "Henry the Fourth", often written "Henry IV", see above.)

Other common cases where modifiers follow a head noun include:

- Phrases like the Brothers Grimm and the Sisters Rosensweig (although in ordinary cases the phrasing "the Brown brothers" is more common)
- Names of military operations and equivalent, such as Operation Barbarossa, Operation Desert Storm, etc.
- Names of scientific projects and the like, such as Project Daedalus, Project Echo
- The adjective "adjacent" is occasionally used postpositive to signify a conceptual and vague relation, such as "politics adjacent".

=== Plurals of expressions with postpositives ===
In the plural forms of expressions with postpositive adjectives or other postpositive modifiers, the pluralizing morpheme (most commonly the suffix -s or -es) is added after the noun, rather than after the entire phrase. For instance, the plural form of town proper is towns proper, that of battle royal is battles royal, that of attorney general is attorneys general, that of bride-to-be is brides-to-be, and that of passer-by is passers-by. See also Plurals of French compounds.

With some such expressions, there is a tendency (by way of regularization) to add the plural suffix to the end of the whole expression. This is usually regarded by prescriptive grammarians as an error. Examples are *queen consorts (where queens consort is considered the correct form) and *court-martials (where the accepted plural is courts-martial, although court-martials can be used as a third person present tense verb form).

This rule does not necessarily apply to phrases with postpositives that have been rigidly fixed into names and titles. For example, an English speaker might say "Were there two separate Weather Undergrounds by the 1970s, or just one single organization?". Other phrases remain as they are because they intrinsically use a plural construction (and have no singular form), such as eggs Benedict, nachos supreme, Brothers Grimm, Workers United.

== See also ==
- Plurals of compound nouns
- Preposition and postposition

== Sources ==
- Cinque, Guglielmo (2010). The Syntax of Adjectives. Cambridge, Massachusetts: MIT Press. ISBN 9780262014168. LCCN 2009043836. OCLC 457772850.
