= Land's End Plantation =

Land's End Plantation may refer to:

- Land's End Plantation (Scott, Arkansas), listed on the National Register of Historic Places (NRHP)
- Land's End Plantation (Stonewall, Louisiana), also NRHP-listed

== See also ==
- Land's End (disambiguation)
