= Finisterre =

Finisterre, Finistère, Finisterra, or Fisterra, derives from the Latin finis terrae, meaning "end of the earth", may refer to:

== Places ==
- Finistère, the westernmost department of France
- Cape Finisterre (Fisterra), a headland in Galicia, northwest Spain
  - Fisterra (comarca), a comarca (county) in A Coruña, Galicia
    - Fisterra, a municipality in the comarca
- Finisterre, a Shipping Forecast sea area renamed FitzRoy in 2002
- Finisterre Range, a mountain range in Papua New Guinea

== Literature ==
- Finisterra (novelette), a 2007 science-fiction novelette by David Moles
- Finistère (novel), a 1951 novel by Fritz Peters
- Finisterre, a poem by Sylvia Plath from her 1971 collection Crossing the Water
- Finisterre, a 1943 poetry collection by Eugenio Montale
- Finisterre universe, in the fiction of C. J. Cherryh

== Music ==
=== Albums ===
- Finisterra (album), a 2000 album by Mägo de Oz
- Finisterre (album), a 2002 album and subsequent film by Saint Etienne
- Finisterre, a 2008 album by Zydepunks
- Finisterre , a 2017 album by Der Weg einer Freiheit

=== Songs ===
- "Finisterre", on the 1990 Cooking Vinyl album Freedom and Rain (1990) by June Tabor and The Oyster Band
- "Finisterre", on the 2006 album Memorial (2006) by the Portuguese gothic metal band Moonspell
- "Finisterre", on the 2011 album Touchstones (2011) by German progressive rock band Subsignal

== Ships ==
- HMS Finisterre, a Royal Navy destroyer
- Finisterre, a Carleton Mitchell yacht, the only one to win the Bermuda Race three times in succession (1956–60)
- FV Finisterre, a crabber lost at St. Ives, Cornwall in 1946

== Other uses ==
- Finisterre (retailer), an English clothing company
- Finisterre languages, spoken in New Guinea
- Alejandro Finisterre (1919–2007), inventor of futbolín, a Spanish variant of table football/foosball
- Felix Finisterre, Saint Lucian politician
- Finisterre, a character in the television show The Adventures of Portland Bill (1983)
- Senator Ortolan Finistirre, a character in the novel Thank You for Smoking and its film adaptation

== See also ==
- Land's End (disambiguation)
- SS Cap Finisterre, a 1911 German transatlantic ocean liner
- Finisterres, a 1997 album by Dan Ar Braz
- Finist'air, airline based in Finistère
- FinisTerrae, supercomputer
