= Manque =

Manque or Manqué may refer to:

- Manqué, a term used in reference to a person who has failed to live up to a specific expectation or ambition
- Lack (psychoanalysis), a concept in the work of philosopher Jacques Lacan also known by its French name manque
- Manque, the set of slots 1–18 in a game of roulette
