= Greg Mort =

American painter

Greg Mort (born March 22, 1952) is an American artist and amateur astronomer whose paintings have received numerous exhibitions. His portraits, still lifes and landscape paintings are represented in public collections including the Smithsonian National Air and Space Museum, Corcoran Gallery of Art, Smithsonian American Art Museum, Vatican Observatory, Brandywine River Museum, Farnsworth Art Museum, and the Academy Art Museum in Easton, MD, which was gifted the David H. Hickman Collection of 38 Mort paintings.

Private collections with Mort's work include those of Bill Clinton, Hillary Clinton, Al Gore, Robin Williams and Carl Sagan.

In 2008, the Greg Mort Family established The Art of Stewardship, a not-for-profit foundation to support other artists in expressing their environmental concerns through art. Mort began with his series of Stewardship paintings.

Mort divides his time between the semi-rural village of Ashton, MD and Fieldstone Castle, Port Clyde, Maine.

== Books ==
In 2007, Voyages: Exploring the Art of Greg Mort, written by Greg Mort and edited by Thomas Y. Canby, was published by Sea Glass Publishers.
