= Phoenix Rising =

Phoenix rising originally describes the heraldic position of the image of a phoenix: its head upturned (to its right) with wings raised for flight. The term can also refer to:

== Film and television ==
- Phoenix Rising (Hong Kong TV series), a 2007 Hong Kong period drama series
- "Phoenix Rising" (Babylon 5), an episode of Babylon 5
- "Phoenix Rising" (Eureka), an episode of Eureka
- Phoenix Rising, a 2006 film featuring Leo Laporte
- Phoenix Rising (American TV series), a 2022 American documentary series

== Music ==
- Phoenix Rising (band), a symphonic power metal band from Spain
- Phoenix Rising (Artension album), 1997
- Phoenix Rising (The Temptations album), 1998
- Phoenix Rising, an album released in by Deströyer 666
- Phoenix Rising (Galneryus album), 2011
- Phoenix Rising (Deep Purple album), a 2011 combo CD/DVD live album by Deep Purple
- "Phoenix Rising", a song by Annihilator on the album Set the World on Fire
- "Phoenix Rising", a song by Masterplan on the album MK II
- Phoenix Arising, composition for bassoon and piano by Graham Waterhouse, 2008

== Other uses ==
- Phoenix Rising (novel), a 1994 young-adult novel by Karen Hesse
- Phoenix Rising (novel series), a trilogy of children's novels by Erica Verrillo
- Phoenix Rising FC, a USL Championship team in Phoenix, Arizona
- Phoenix Rising Esports, the premier esports organization for competitive Heroes of the Storm
- Phoenix Rising, an inverted family roller coaster at Busch Gardens Tampa Bay

== See also ==
- Phoenix Rise (disambiguation)
