= Port Clyde, Maine =

Settlement in the U.S. state of Maine

Coordinates: 43°55′38″N 69°15′10″W

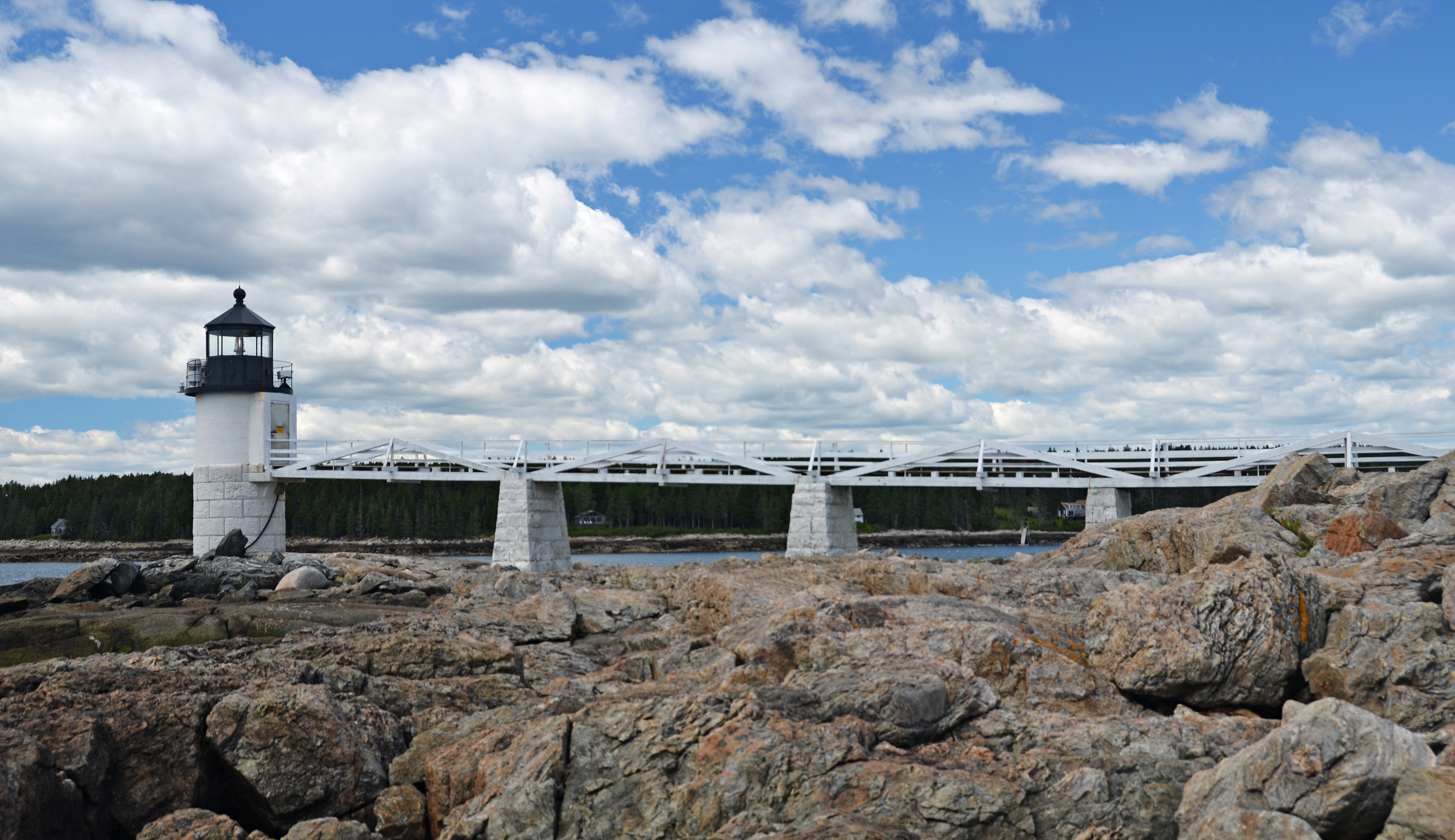
The Marshall Point Light in Port Clyde

Port Clyde is the southernmost settlement on the St. George peninsula in central/coastal Maine and part of the town of St. George in Knox County, Maine, United States. The ZIP Code for Port Clyde is 04855.

== History ==
In the 19th century, Port Clyde became a busy port featuring granite quarries, tide mills for sawing timber, and shipbuilding and fish canning businesses. By the 20th century, the area attracted artists and writers. The Country of the Pointed Firs was written by Sarah Orne Jewett in St. George.

Port Clyde's harbor was originally known as Herring Gut. Marshall Point—site of the Marshall Point Lighthouse—is Port Clyde's southernmost extremity. This lighthouse is the one to which Tom Hanks ran in the 1994 film Forrest Gump.

Monhegan Boat Line operates out of Port Clyde, providing round trip ferry service to Monhegan island, and has been operating in some form since 1914.

Port Clyde was home to The Port Clyde Packing Co., manufacturer of Port Clyde Sardines. Employing around 200 people, it was the largest employer in the area for most of its existence. The factory was destroyed in a fire on September 26, 1970.

An overnight fire on September 27–28, 2023, destroyed the settlement's general store, the Maine Wyeth Art Gallery, a restaurant, and offices of the local boat line.

== Residences ==
- The Wyeth family, with three generations of accomplished artists, has owned a summer home in Port Clyde ever since N.C. Wyeth purchased "Eight Bells" in the early 1920s. His son Andrew Wyeth long owned property and spent time in the area, as does N.C.'s grandson, Jamie Wyeth. Andrew's widow Betsy owned two islands off Port Clyde.
- Supreme Court Chief Justice John Roberts and his wife purchased a home on Hupper Island just off the coast of Port Clyde in 2006. The house is a one-story structure built in the 1960s and reportedly purchased for $475,000.
- Kenneth Noland, one of the best known American color field painters, spent the last several years of his life in Port Clyde. There he worked regularly at his studio and owned a home with his wife, Paige Rense, Editor-in-Chief of Architectural Digest.
- Port Clyde is the site of Fieldstone Castle, built by Russell W. Porter, currently inhabited by artist Greg Mort as his summer studio.
- Port Clyde is the site of Land's End Historic District, a former artists' colony built by Russell W. Porter that is now a group of summer cottages.
- Port Clyde is the site of a home designed by Russell W. Porter as the town library.
