= Finisterre (retailer) =

British outdoor apparel company

- Industry: Surfwear; Outdoor wear; Sustainable fashion
- Founded: 2003
- Headquarters: St Agnes
- Key people: Tom Kay, Founder
- Products: wetsuits jackets underwear outerwear
- Website: finisterre.com

Finisterre is an outdoor apparel and surfwear company with a focus on functional and sustainable products. Based in St Agnes, Cornwall, and founded by Tom Kay in 2003, it is recognised as a cold water surf company.

== History ==
In 2003, Tom Kay founded Finisterre above a surf shop after noticing problems with the ethics, design and functionality of many action sports brands. It started with a fleece and quickly grew to include a range of clothing for surfers to wear before and after surfing.

In 2023, Finisterre were developing a wetsuit made out of recycled neoprene from old suits.

== Products ==
Finisterre produces a range of technical clothing including merino underwear and base layers, waterproof and insulated jackets, sweatshirts, hoodies along with clothing for running and yoga. In all lines of Finisterre's clothing range, performance and sustainability are key factors. The products have been well reviewed by a number of sources for both their performance and green credentials.

Exclusive fabrics such as "C-shell" used in the "Anabatic Jacket" have been developed using recycled polyester and is fully recyclable at the end of the jackets lifespan. Recycled polyester is also used to make the fill in the range of insulated jackets as well as fleeces. The range of sweatshirts and Tshirts are all produced from Organic Cotton that is grown in Eastern Europe and spun in Portugal. Finisterre produce a range of merino wool layers including long johns, underwear, vests, and short and long sleeve t-shirts. The merino wool is sourced from Australia with full traceability reports to ensure none of the sheep subjected to the practice of mulesing.

In 2015, the production of many garments was controversially moved to China. Despite Human Rights abuses and other ethical concerns, Finisterre defended the move on the grounds of overall carbon footprint and the need of a small business to grow. In 2019, Finisterre announced to use garment bags made from Aquapak polymer for the spring 2020 collection.

== Projects ==
=== Bowmont Wool ===
The Bowmont sheep is a breed of sheep bred by Macaulay Institute in the 1980s. It was developed by crossing a Saxon Merino with a Shetland to produce a fiber quality in the UK to rival that of Merino wool from New Zealand and Australia. In 2006 Macaulay Institute closed its research farm due to a funding shortfall. By that time, the Bowmont sheep were reaching consistency and a stabilized breed type. Due to insufficient market demand, a significant portion of the flock was either slaughtered or crossbred, which resulted in a less expensive wool. Finistrre teamed up with Lesley Priro at Devon Fine Fibres, the sole breeder of purebred Bowmonts - to create a commercial market for this wool. With the help of successful promotional material and videos the project attracted attention from the likes of Prince Charles and Savile Row, rebranded as the sustainability of producing high quality, fine wool in the UK. The Bowmont tries to claim the fame of the finest wool sheep in Europe; only being challenged by the merino in further afield parts of the world.

=== I-spy - Traceability Programme ===
The i-spy initiative is a tool on Finisterre's website that is a clear and concise source of information showing the traceability of the Finisterre products. It shows the full cycle of the Finisterre products from design through to reaching the customer. Within the cycle it enables the viewer to get detailed information about exactly what materials are used and where they are sourced, where and how the materials are processed, the location of the manufacturing and how the materials and products are transported between each of these steps.

== Ambassadors ==
Finisterre supports a number of athletes and adventurers in a range of pursuits. Known as ambassadors for the brand these people include

Athletes

- Matt Smith (Captain)
- Noah Lane
- Fergal Smith
- Easkey Britton
- Sandy Kerr
- Sam Bleakley

Photographers

- David Gray
- James Bowden
- Ian Mitchinson
- Jack Johns
- Chris McClean
- Lewis Arnold
- Mickey Smith
- Al Mackinnon
- Abbi Hughes

Finisterre also supported former Rugby player Josh Lewsey on his attempt to climb Mount Everest. Sadly Josh did not reach the summit due to a failure within his oxygen equipment and was forced to descend in a matter of life and death urgency.

== Awards ==
During the company's history it has received a range of awards. Its awards include the RSPCA good business Award 2010, Observer Ethical Business Award 2008 and the Surfer's Path Green Wave Award 2008.

Finisterre became a certified B Corporation in January 2018.
