= Phoenix Rise =

Phoenix Rise may refer to:

- Phoenix Rise (TV series), a 2023 British drama series
- "Phoenixrise", a 2009 song by Maxwell from BLACKsummers'night

== See also ==
- Phoenix Rising (disambiguation)
