= Land's End Historic District =

Historic district in Maine, United States

- U.S. National Register of Historic Places
- U.S. Historic district
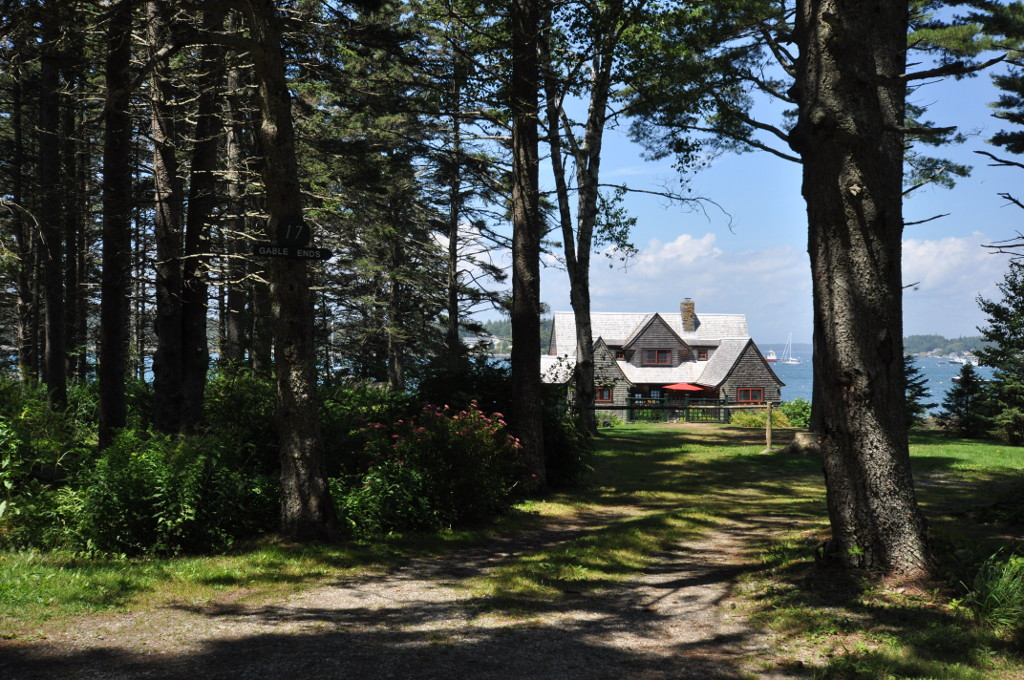

- Location within Maine Location within the United States
- Location: Marshall Point & Cottage Rds., Lentine & Land's End Lns., St. George, Maine
- Coordinates: 43°55′16″N 69°15′19″W
- Area: 45 acres (18 ha)
- Built: 1907
- Built by: Russell W. Porter
- Architectural style: Shingle Style, Craftsman, English Revival
- NRHP reference No.: 11000633
- Added to NRHP: September 8, 2011

The Land's End Historic District encompasses a well-preserved enclave of summer residences built in the early 20th century in the Port Clyde area of St. George, Maine. Developed between 1907 and 1919 by Russell W. Porter, it includes an architecturally eclectic mix of modestly scaled cottages. The district was listed on the National Register of Historic Places in 2011.

== Description and history ==
The town of St. George occupies a peninsula and islands on the west side of Penobscot Bay in the Mid Coast region of southern Maine. The southernmost mainland tip of the peninsula is Marshall Point, where the Marshall Point Light is located. The finger of land between the lighthouse and the village of Port Clyde is where the Land's End colony is located. The colony, unlike other such developments on the Maine coast, consists of a collection of stylistically diverse summer houses. Although the Shingle and Craftsman styles predominate, there are also fine examples of the English Colonial Revival and the French chalet style.

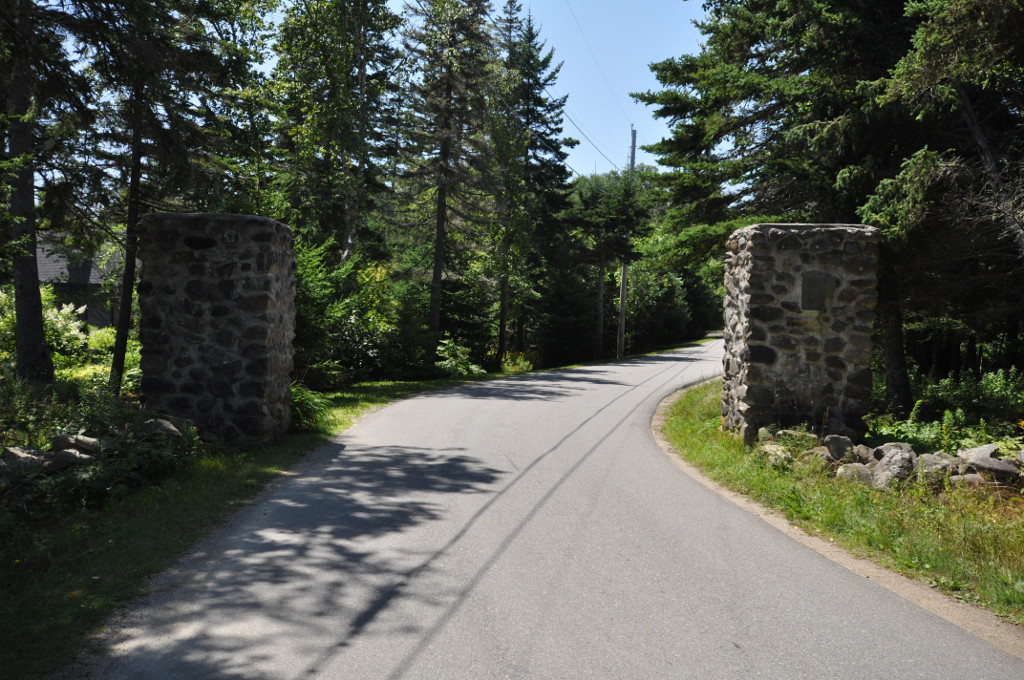
The gates at the entrance to Land's End

The Land's End colony was founded in 1907 by Russell W. Porter, an artist, amateur astronomer, and Arctic explorer. After participating in a series of Arctic exploratory expeditions, Porter sought a retreat where he could engage in pursuits in astronomy and art, and chose the area south of the fishing village of Port Clyde. He spent $950 to purchase the entire peninsula, platted it out for development, and built a number of the cottages. He specifically sought to harmonize the buildings with the surrounding environment, including natural features such as pergolas finished in tree bark, and unfinished wooden interiors. Porter's own house, a stone structure in the English Revival style, includes a rounded section in which he intended to mount a telescope. Porter's experiment came to an end in 1919, when he left for Springfield VT to work at the Jones and Lamson Machine Company.

== See also ==
- National Register of Historic Places listings in Cumberland County, Maine
- Stellafane Observatory, an amateur observatory in Vermont, built on land belonging to Porter
