= Sam Bleakley =

British surfer and writer (born 1978)

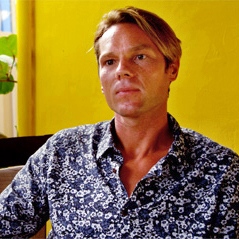
- Sam Bleakley
- Born: 23 October 1978 (age 47); Cornwall, United Kingdom
- Occupations: Travel writer, surfer, author, presenter and filmmaker
- Website: www.sambleakley.co.uk

Sam Bleakley – professional surfer

Sam Bleakley is a British surfer, travel writer, filmmaker, presenter and longboard contest commentator. His published books include Mindfulness and Surfing: reflections for saltwater souls (2016), The Longboard Travel Guide: a guide to the world's best longboarding waves (2015), Surfing Tropical Beats (2011) and Surfing Brilliant Corners (2010). He has been a multiple British and European longboard surfing champion. Sam holds a MA in Geography from Pembroke College, University of Cambridge and a PhD from University of the Arts London and Falmouth University entitled Surfing Haïti, and a new wave of travel writing.

== Surfing ==
Bleakley started surfing aged 5 in Cornwall. He rode shortboards until aged 15. He won his first European Longboard Championship title whilst studying at Cambridge (Praia Grande, Portugal, 1999). He retained the title shortly after graduating (Le Penon, France, 2001). Bleakley has won national, European and international longboard events. He has also won national and international paddle race titles. Bleakley is a commentator for the live broadcast at world longboard events for the International Surfing Association (ISA) and World Surf League (WSL).

== Writing and filmmaking ==
Bleakley's writing has been published in international magazines and newspapers including Conde Nast Traveller, The Guardian, The Financial Times, The Independent, Men's Health, La Repubblica and numerous specialist surfing publications. He has edited longboard specials in Carve and Wavelength magazines, and been a surf columnist in The Cornishman newspaper. In his writing he compares surfing to jazz.

He has published five books on surfing and contributed to several multiauthor volumes on the topic (see Bibliography).

Bleakley has produced, presented, directed, co-edited and written numerous surf travel films including the Brilliant Corners surf travel series on emerging surf cultures. He has appeared in action sport DVDs, documentaries and television programmes about surfing and travel including the BBC's The Perfect Wave (2001) and Grandstand (World Surfing Games 2002), Channel 4's 360 series (2001) and ITV's Surf's Up series (2002). In the Brilliant Corners series Bleakley has directed and presented films on Haiti, Jamaica, Barbados, Liberia, China, Sierra Leone, Oman, Ghana, The Philippines, Mauritania, Madagascar, Papua New Guinea, India and Senegal.

== Bibliography ==
- Bleakley, S. (2020). Mindful Thoughts for Surfers: Tuning in to the Tides. Lewes: Leaping Hare Press.
- Bleakley, S. (2016). Mindfulness and Surfing: Reflections for Saltwater Souls. Lewes: Leaping Hare Press.
- Bleakley, S. (2015). The Longboard Travel Guide: A Guide to the World's Best Longboarding Waves. Newquay: Orca Publications.
- Bleakley, S. (2012). Surfing Tropical Beats. Penzance: Alison Hodge Publishers.
- Bleakley, S. (2011). Surfing Tropical Beats (Chinese edition). Haikou: Hainan Publishing House.
- Bleakley, S. (2010). Surfing Brilliant Corners. Penzance: Alison Hodge Publishers.
- Mansfield, R. (Editor Bleakley, S.) (2009). The Surfing Tribe: A History of Surfing in Britain. Newquay: Orca Publications.
- Manetta, J. (Contributing Editor Bleakley, S.) (2014). Looking For Something To Find. Mount Hawke: Toadhall Press.
- Zanella, N. (Editor Bleakley, S.) (2019). Children of the Tide: An Exploration of Surfing in Dynastic China. Milan: Grafiche Antiga.
