= Manqué =

French term for underperformer

A manqué (feminine manquée, from the French for "missed") is a person who has failed to live up to a specific expectation or ambition. It is usually used in combination with a profession: for example, a career civil servant with political prowess who nonetheless never attained political office might be described as a "politician manqué". It can also be used relative to a specific role model; a second-rate method actor might be referred to as a "Marlon Brando manqué".

== Overview ==
The term derives from the past participle of the French verb manquer (to miss, to fail, to lack). In English, it is used postpositively, that is, following the noun it modifies in the manner of most adjectives in French.

The British political writer and former M.P. David Marquand described the mid-20th century Labour politician Aneurin Bevan as a "statesman manqué", while the magazine Private Eye referred to journalist Janet Street-Porter as an "architect manquée".

The Collins Dictionary gave the example of a manager as an "actor manqué", while the Oxford Dictionary of Foreign Words and Phrases cited the Times magazine in 1996 as describing a "subway genius" as "a writer manqué since many of his chosen citations deal with creating literature". Arising from the apocryphal inscription on Plato's door in Ancient Greece, "let no one devoid of geometry enter here", the 17th-century philosopher Thomas Hobbes has been described as typifying a "mathematician manqué".

In Vladimir Nabokov's Lolita, the narrator, Humbert Humbert, reminisces, "At first, I planned to take a degree in psychiatry as many manqué talents do; but I was even more manqué than that . . . and I switched to English literature."

== As failure ==
In French manqué is sometimes applied to someone who has failed to gain professional status - such as un médecin manqué (a failed doctor) - whereas, in English, it need not have that pejorative implication. In the game of roulette the set of numbers from 1 to 18 is described as manque (no accent), meaning that the ball has "failed" to land in one of the higher (19–36) slots.

== Manky ==
The slang manky, meaning "inferior" or "dirty", is thought to be linked in some way to manqué, possibly from the Scots word mank (maimed or defective) but maybe via Polari. The ancestor of all these words is the Latin mancus (maimed or crippled; and, by transference, imperfect or incomplete).
