= Prometheus Unbound =

Prometheus Unbound may refer to:

- Prometheus Unbound (Aeschylus), a play by Aeschylus
- Prometheus Unbound (Shelley), a play by Shelley
- Prometheus Unbound, the second book of the manga Appleseed
- Prometheus Unbound, a work for chorus and orchestra (1944) by Havergal Brian
- Prometheus Unbound (Carl Bloch), an 1864 painting by the Danish artist Carl Bloch, now in Athens
- "Prometheus Unbound" (Stargate SG-1), episode of the television show Stargate SG-1
- "Prometheus Unbound", the third episode of the second season of Beast Machines
- Scenes from Shelley's Prometheus Unbound, a work for chorus and orchestra (1880) by Hubert Parry
- Prometheus Unbound, the student magazine of Landon School
- "Prometheus Unbound", a poem by Filipino poet Pete Lacaba

== See also ==
- The Unbound Prometheus, an economic history book by David Landes
