= Marshall Point Light =

Lighthouse in Maine, US

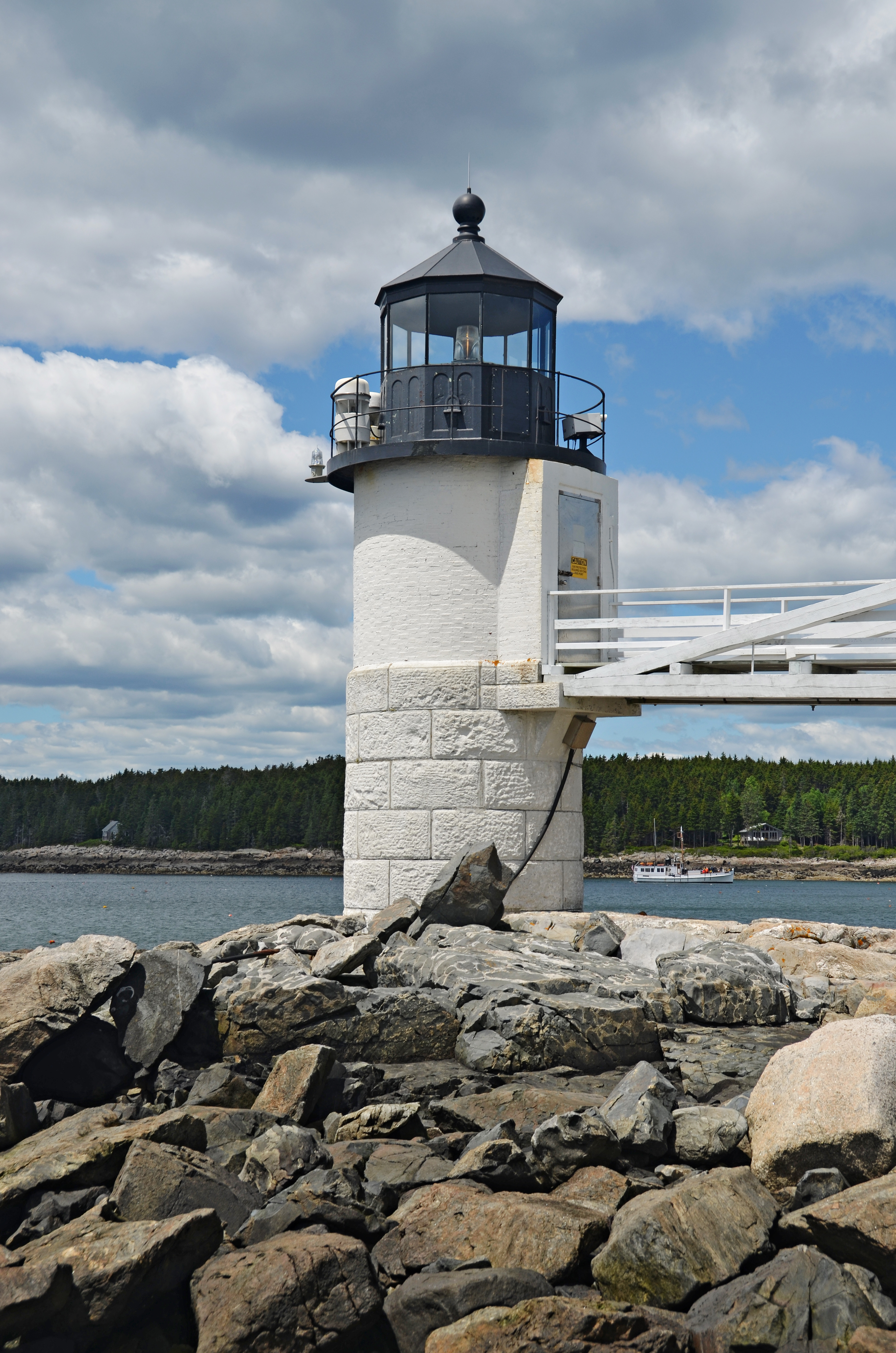
- Location: Port Clyde, Maine
- Coordinates: 43°55′2.718″N 69°15′40.568″W

Tower
- Constructed: 1832
- Foundation: Granite blocks
- Construction: Granite and brick
- Automated: 1971
- Height: 9 m (30 ft)
- Shape: Cylindrical
- Markings: White with black lantern
- Heritage: National Register of Historic Places listed place
- Fog signal: 1898: Bell; 1969: Horn, 1 every 10s

Light
- First lit: 1858
- Focal height: 30 feet (9.1 m)
- Lens: 5th order Fresnel lens (original), 12 inches (300 mm) (current)
- Range: 13 nautical miles (24 km; 15 mi)
- Characteristic: fixed white
- Marshall Point Light Station
- U.S. National Register of Historic Places
- U.S. Historic district
- Nearest city: Port Clyde, Maine
- Area: 5 acres (2.0 ha)
- Built: 1857
- Architect: US Army Corps of Engineers
- MPS: Light Stations of Maine MPS
- NRHP reference No.: 87002262
- Added to NRHP: March 23, 1988

Marshall Point Light Station is a lighthouse at the entrance of Port Clyde Harbor in Port Clyde, Maine. The light station was established in 1832.

== History ==
Marshall Point Light Station was established in 1832 to assist boats entering and leaving Port Clyde Harbor. Four acres of land previously owned by Samuel Marshall were purchased for $120. The land was named for an early settler who had a homestead, John Marshall. The original lighthouse was a 20-foot (6.1 m) tower lit by seven lard oil lamps with 14-inch reflectors.

The original tower was replaced with the present lighthouse in 1857. The lighthouse is a 31-foot-tall (9.4 m) white brick tower on a granite foundation. The tower was originally lit with a fifth-order Fresnel lens. A raised wooden walkway connects the tower to land.

In 1895, the original keeper's house was destroyed by lightning. A Colonial Revival style house was built to replace it. An oil house and a bell tower with a 1,000-pound (450 kg) bell were added in 1898. All the following keepers lived in the new house, including Charles Clement who was the keeper from 1874 to 1919. The bell was replaced with a fog horn in 1969.

The lighthouse was automated in 1980 and the original Fresnel lens was replaced with a modern 12-inch (300 mm) optic. The original lens is at the Maine Lighthouse Museum in Rockland. In 1986, the St. George Historical Society restored the keeper's house and established the Marshall Point Lighthouse Museum there, presenting the histories of Marshall Point Light and other nearby lighthouses. The light station was added to the National Register of Historic Places in 1988.

The lighthouse appeared in the 1994 film Forrest Gump.

The light station was transferred to the town of St. George in 1998 under the Maine Lights Program. The fog signal has been dismantled but the bell remains on display.

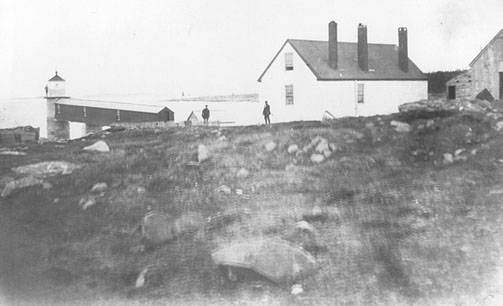
Marshall Point Light before 1895 with original keeper's house

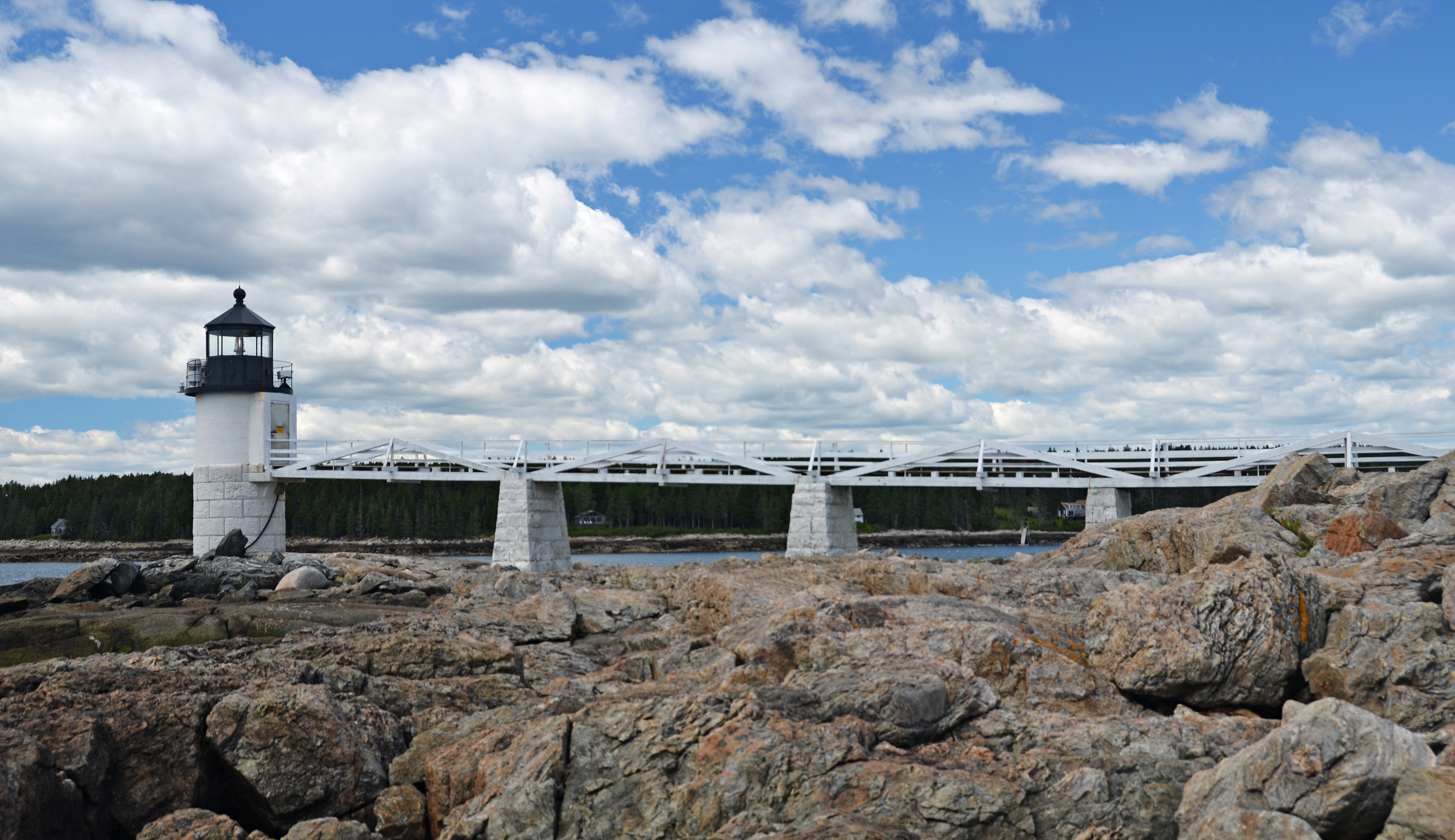
The light and access bridge

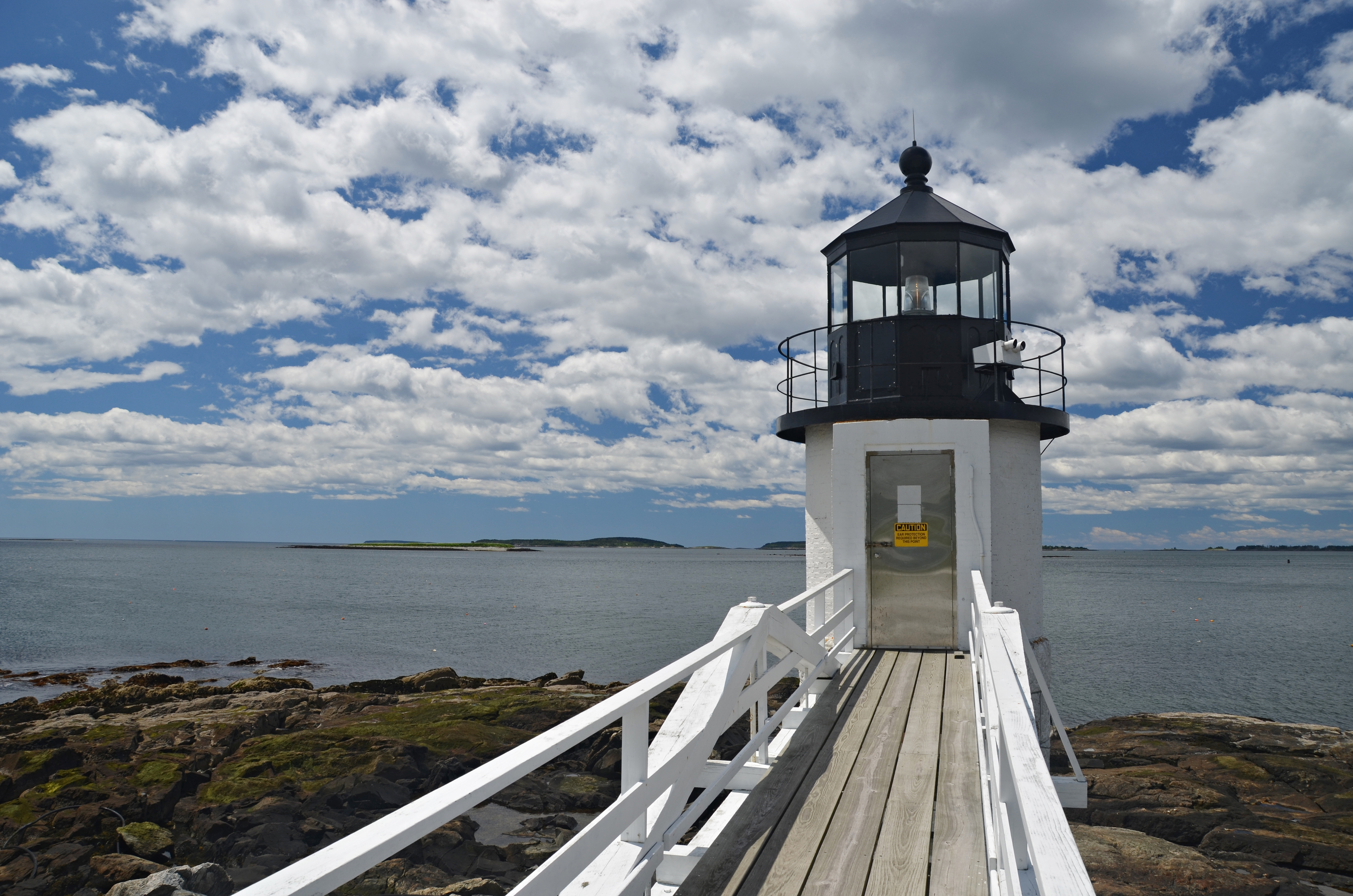
View from the access bridge

== See also ==
- National Register of Historic Places listings in Knox County, Maine
- List of maritime museums in the United States
