= World's End, Kensington and Chelsea =

Coordinates: 51.482°N 0.181°W

World's End
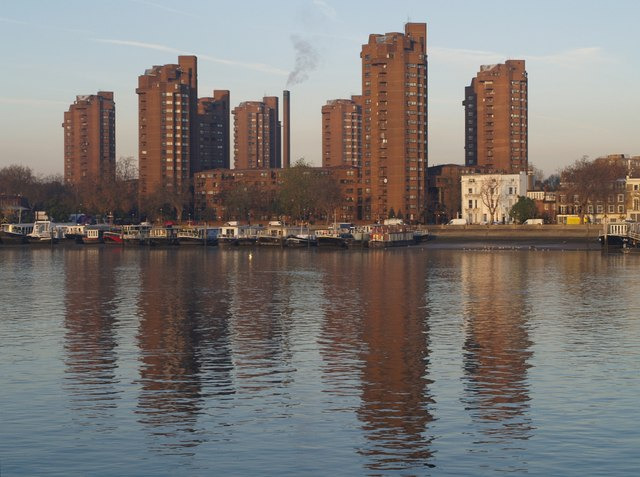
- The World's End Estate

- Location within Greater London
- London borough: Kensington & Chelsea
- Ceremonial county: Greater London
- Region: London
- Country: England
- Sovereign state: United Kingdom
- Post town: LONDON
- Dialling code: 020
- Police: Metropolitan
- Fire: London
- Ambulance: London
- UK Parliament: Chelsea and Fulham
- London Assembly: West Central

World's End is a district of Chelsea, London, lying at the western end of the King's Road. Once a Victorian slum area, council housing was built here in the 20th century, including the brutalist architecture World's End estate.

== History ==
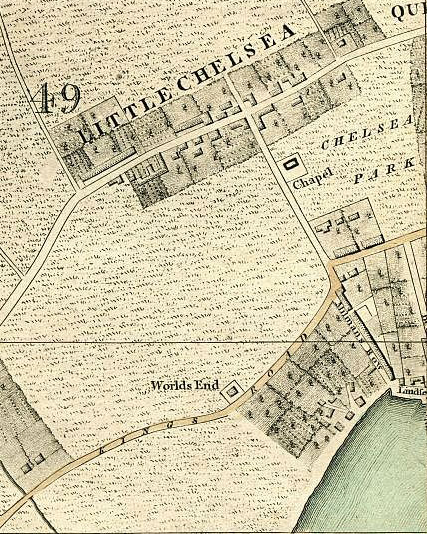
World's End, Chelsea, London. From Cary's New And Accurate Plan Of London And Westminster

The area takes its name from The World's End, a public house which dates back to at least the 17th century. However, like the district of Elephant and Castle, the origins of names of public houses are obscure.

In the King's Road, near Milman Street, is an inn styled "The World's End." The old tavern... was a noted house of entertainment in the reign of Charles II. The tea-gardens and grounds were extensive, and elegantly fitted up for the reception of company. The house was probably called "The World's End" on account of its then considerable distance from London, and the bad and dangerous state of the roads and pathways leading to it. (Old and New London, 1878)

It is mentioned in Congreve's Restoration comedy Love for Love (1695) as a place of questionable reputation to the west of London.

On Cary's New And Accurate Plan Of London And Westminster (1795), the inn is shown on the north side of Kings Road, the only building in the area. The modern public house, the World's End Distillery, on the south side of King's Road, was built in 1897.

Famous ex-residents of the World's End Estate include Christine Keeler and Joe Strummer.

== The 1960s ==
The fashionable set who had made their home at the other end of the Kings Road discovered the World's End and found it was the perfect place to open the boutique Granny Takes a Trip. There were several boutiques and hippie shops that clustered round World's End in the late 1960s including Gandalf's Garden selling candles, incense, spiritual books and hippy paraphernalia. Sophisticat sold reconditioned pine furniture and was home to Christian the lion cub; The Sweet Shop at 28 Blantyre Street sold silk velvet patchwork and applique cushions, tunics, and wallhanging designed by artist Laura Jamieson. The shop was frequented by Twiggy, Jean Shrimpton, and Keith Richards.

A short distance away on the King's Road was the Dragon Tea Garden, a meeting place for local aristocrats, bohemians and hippies who sat on floor cushions, played backgammon and sipped exotic teas. The World's End became a centre for the counter-culture world of the 1960s. This continued in the late 1970s and 1980s with the opening of the boutique SEX started by Vivienne Westwood in the 1970s (which is now known as World's End).

== Housing ==
In the 1950s Chelsea Borough Council erected new social housing, in particular the Cremorne Estate (named after the historical Cremorne Gardens, which, contrary to popular belief, did not once stand on that site). Cremorne Gardens was further to the west, between Ashburnham Road and Lots Road.

This was followed, in early 70's, by the red brick towers of the World's End estate which swept away many Victorian terraced houses. The estate was designed by Jim Cadbury-Brown and Eric Lyons, and is now known for its brutalist architecture.

== Gallery ==
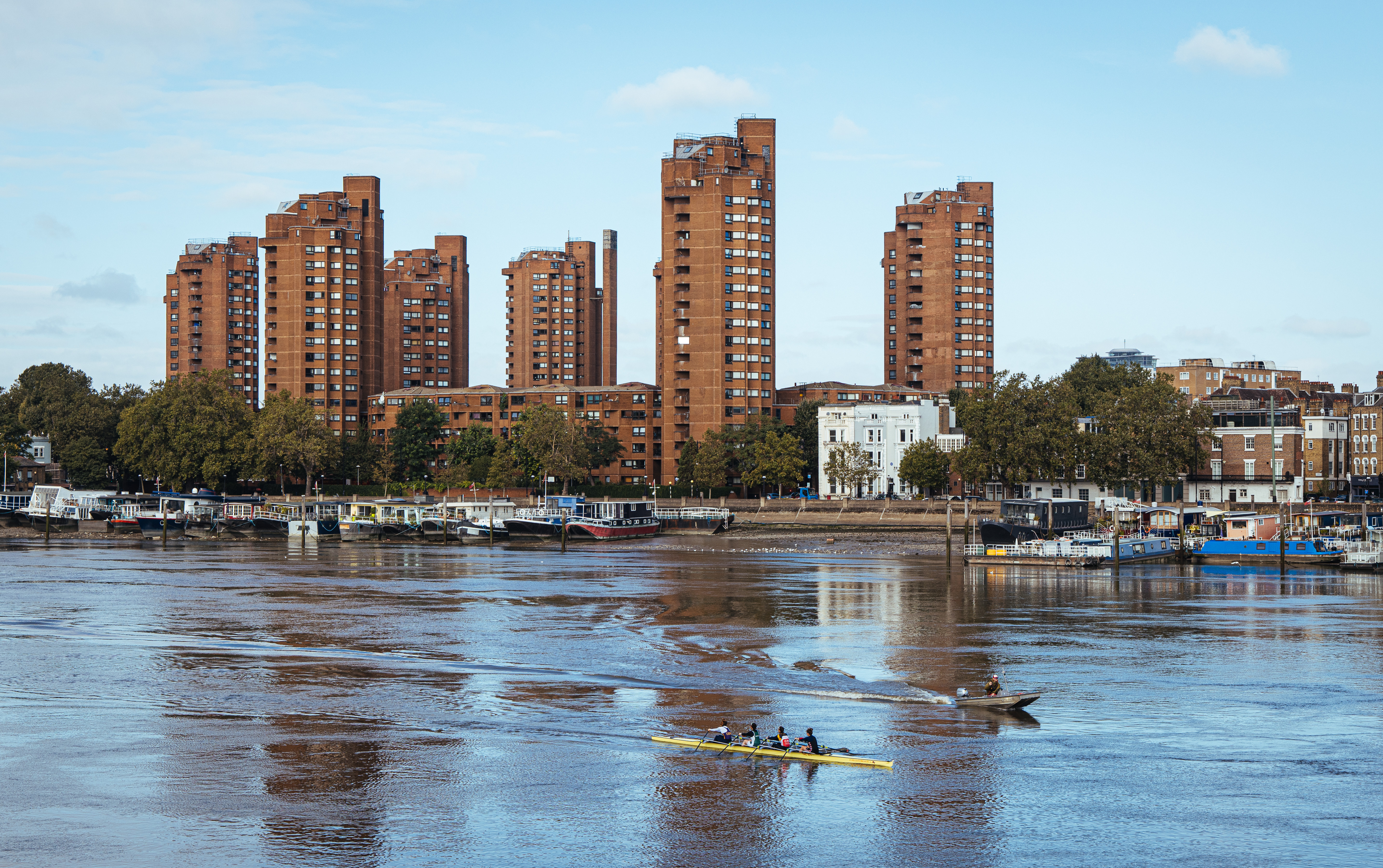

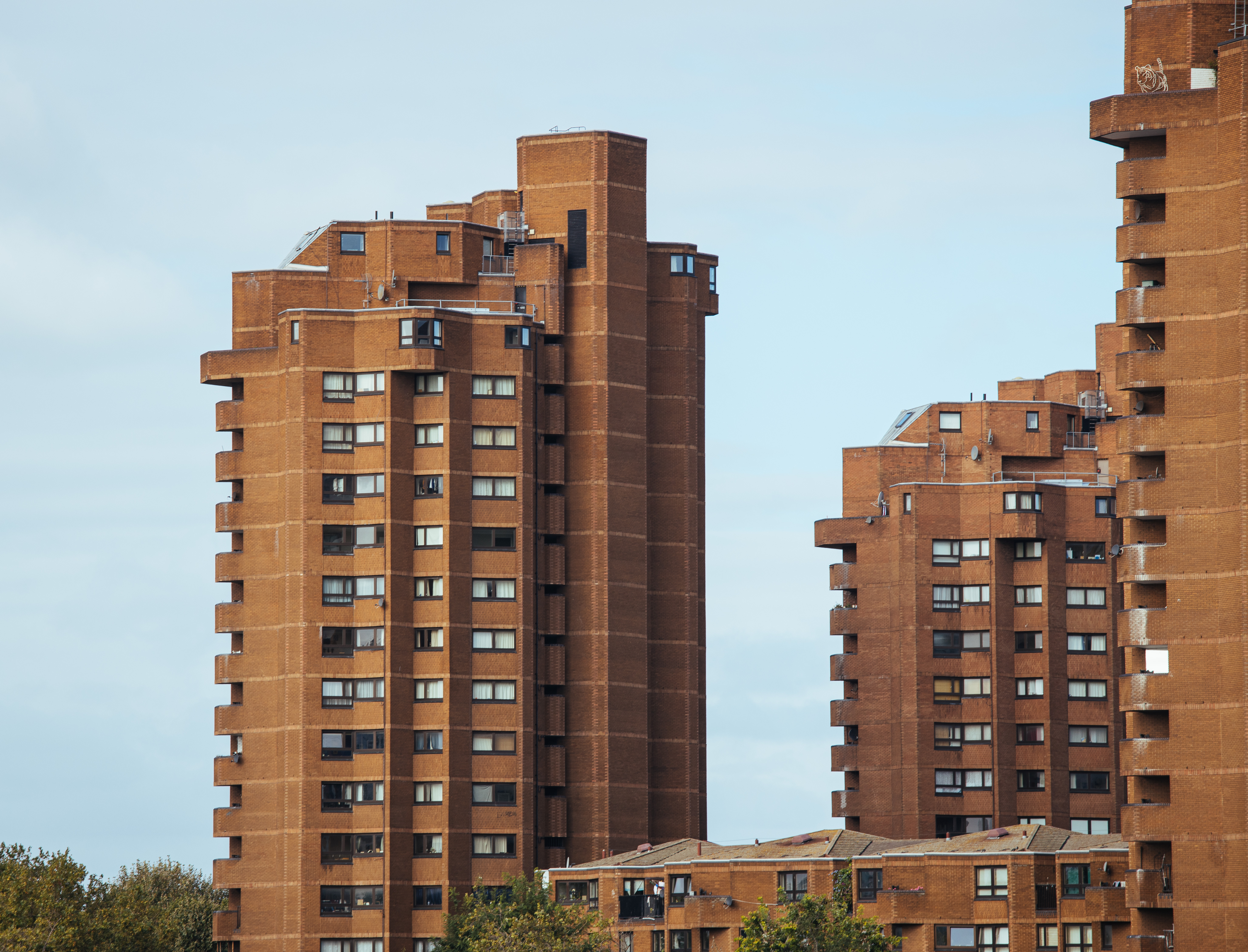

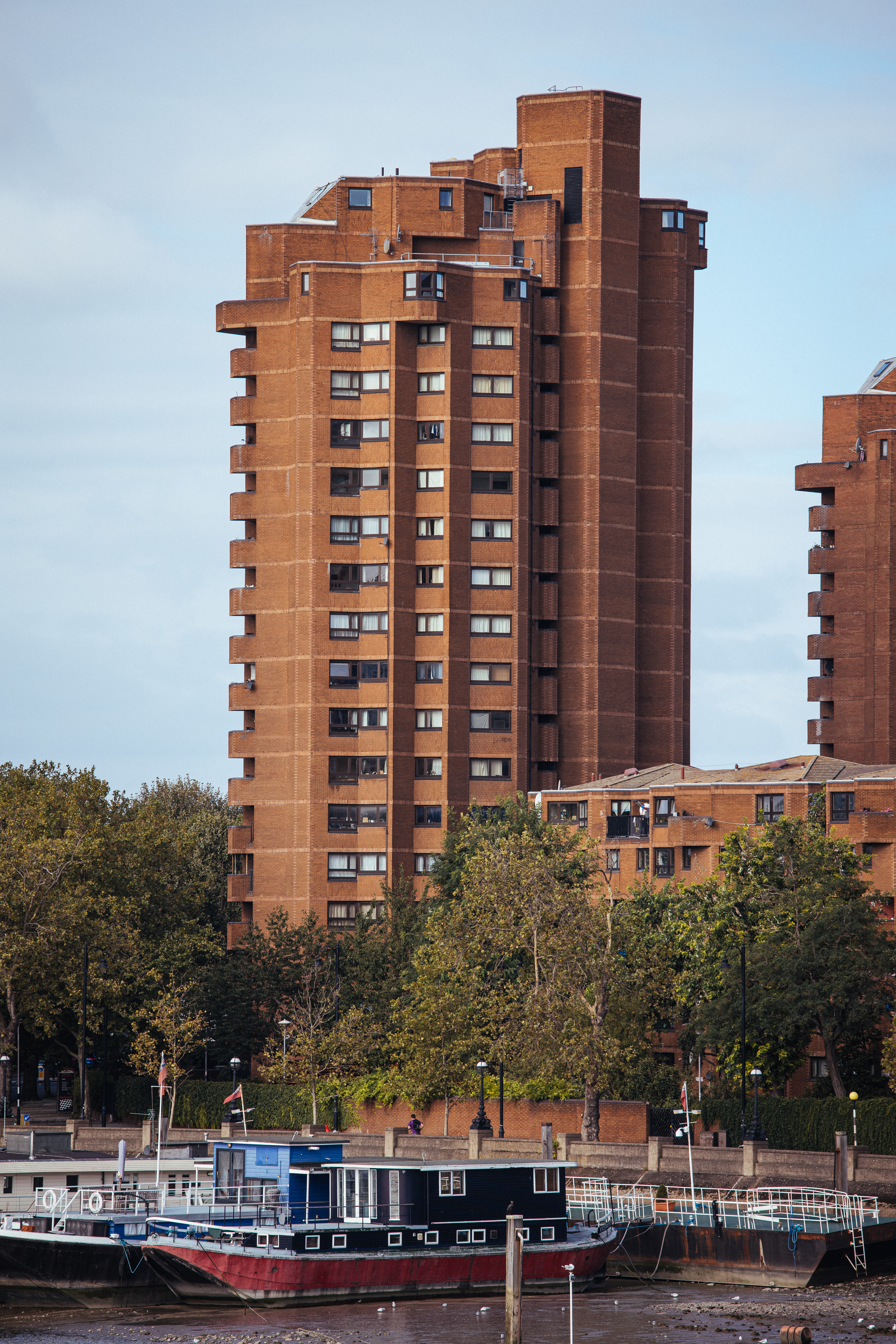

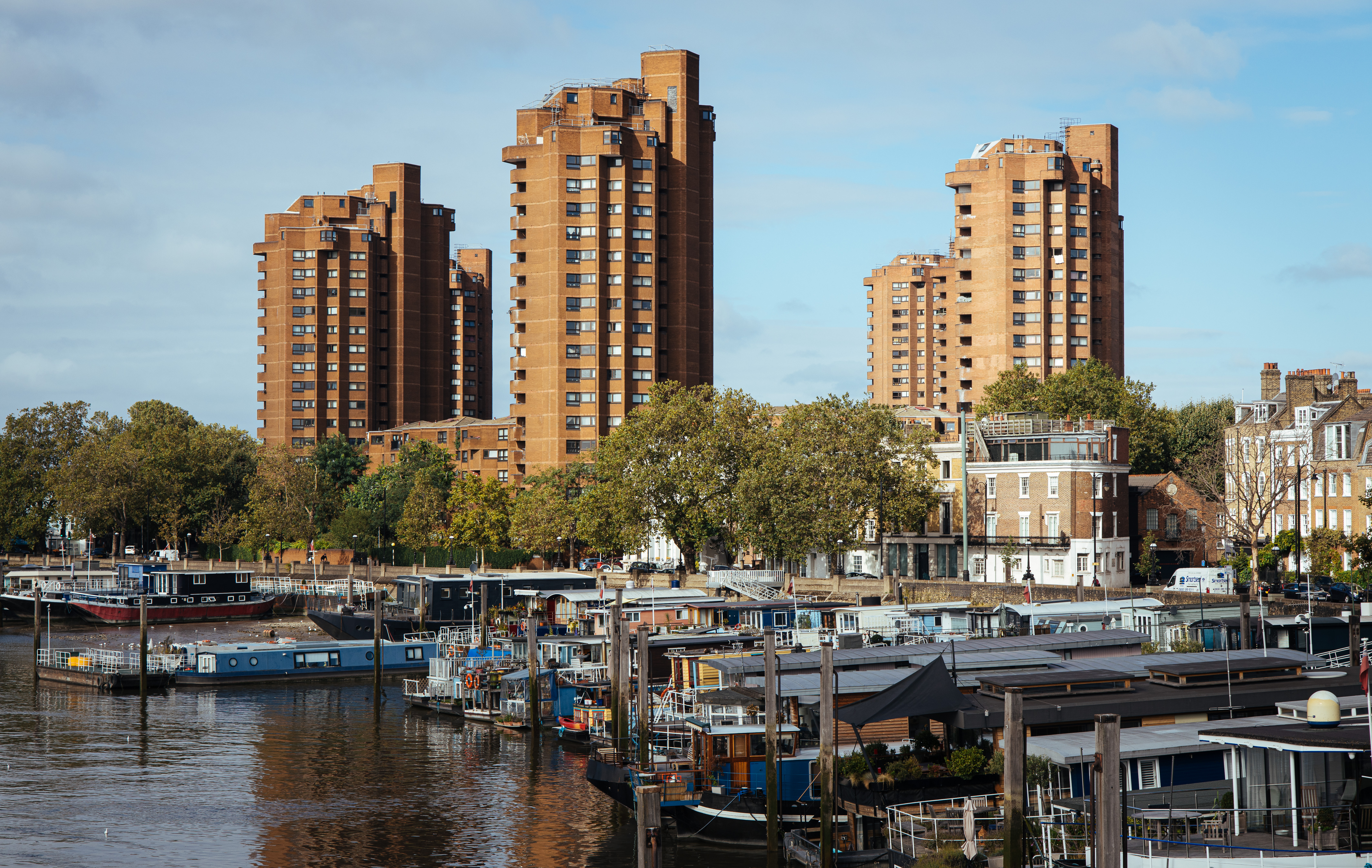

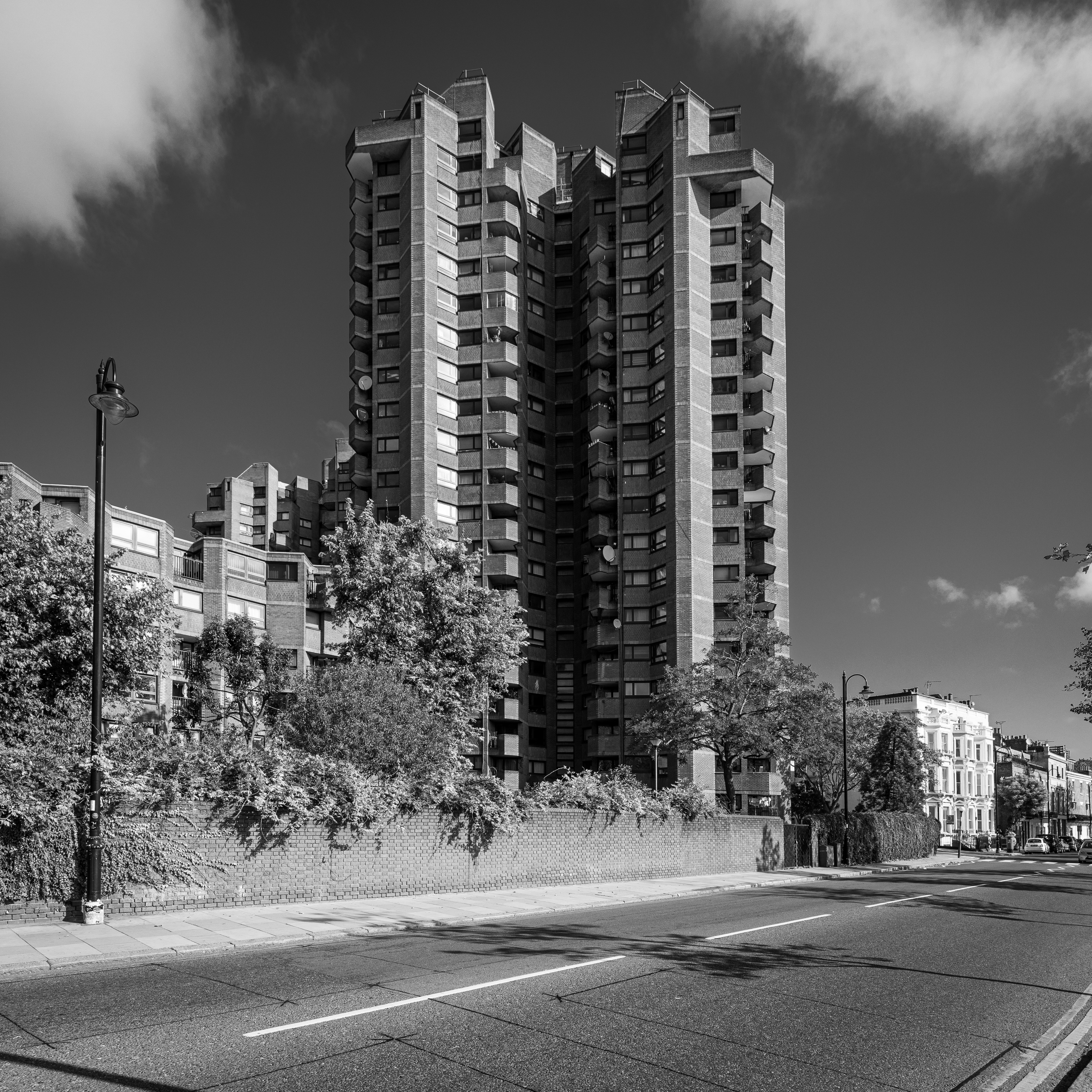

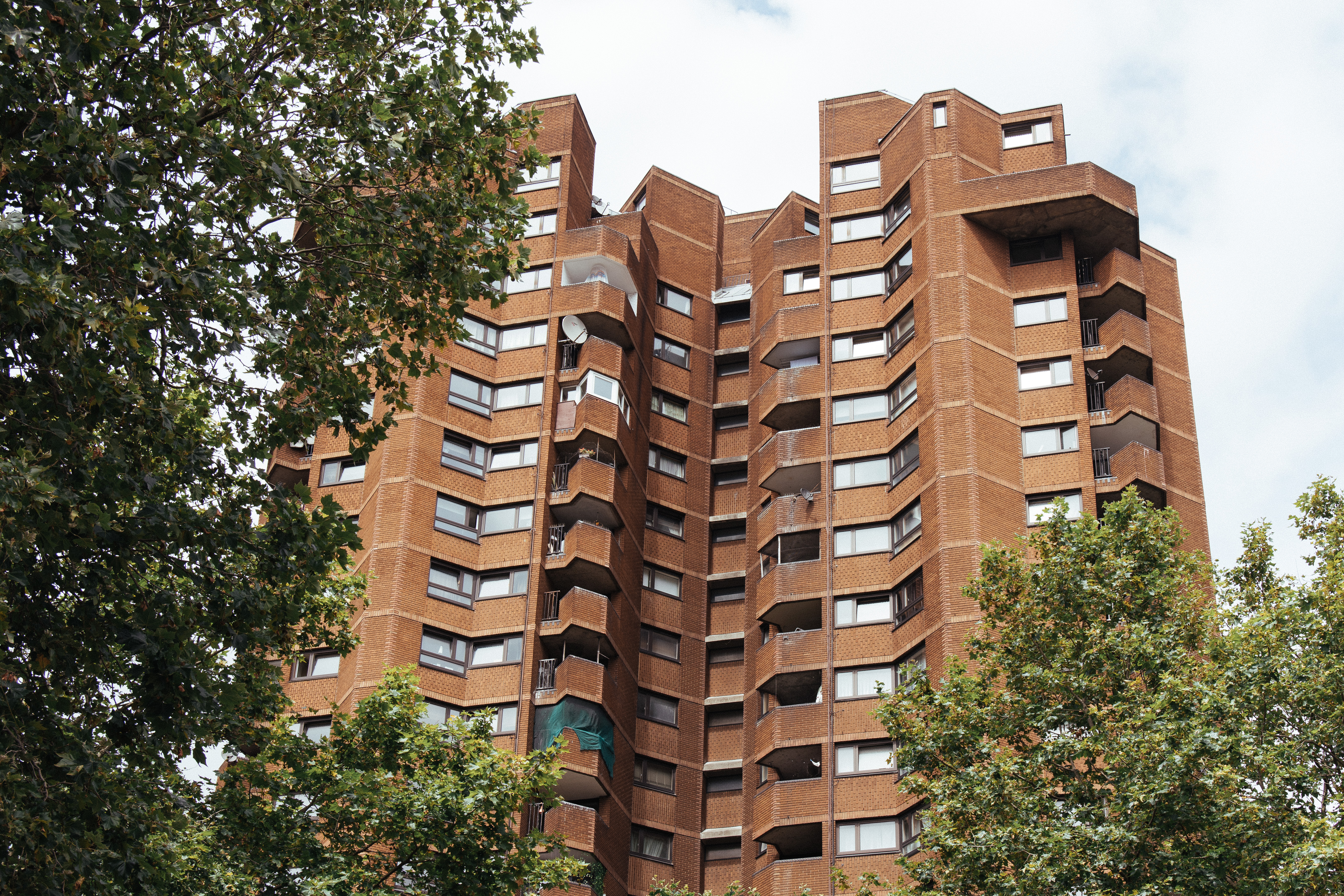

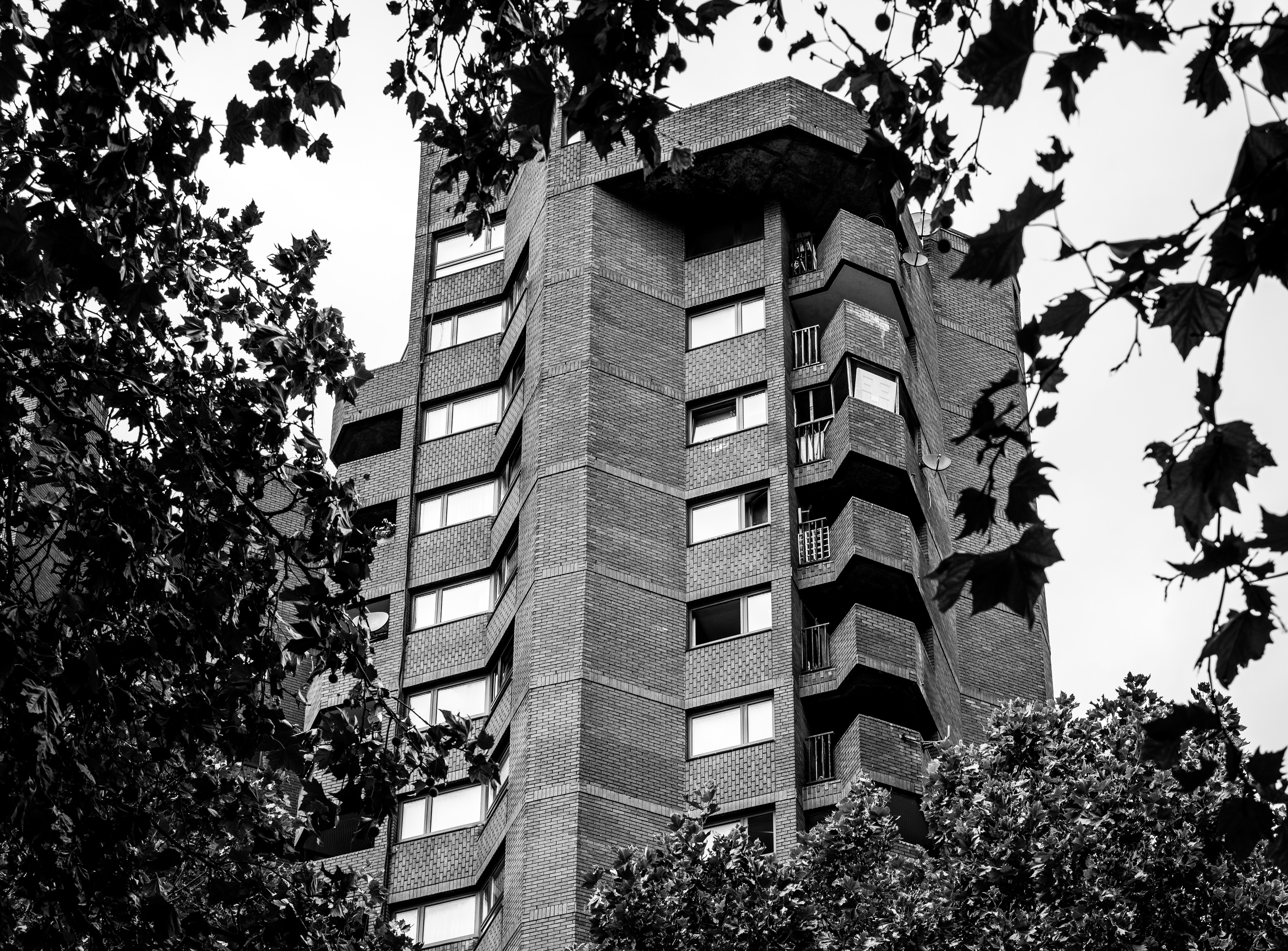

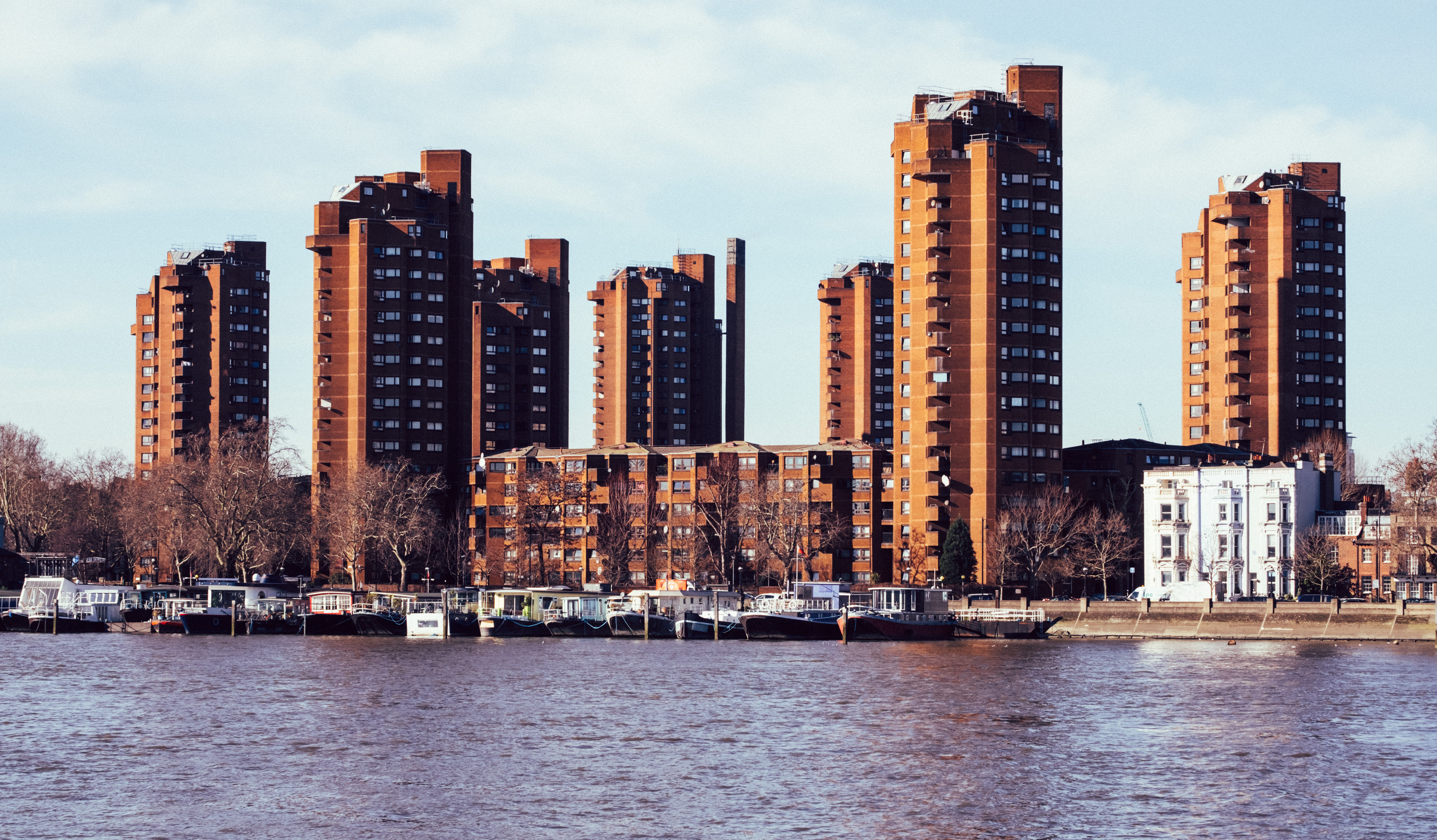

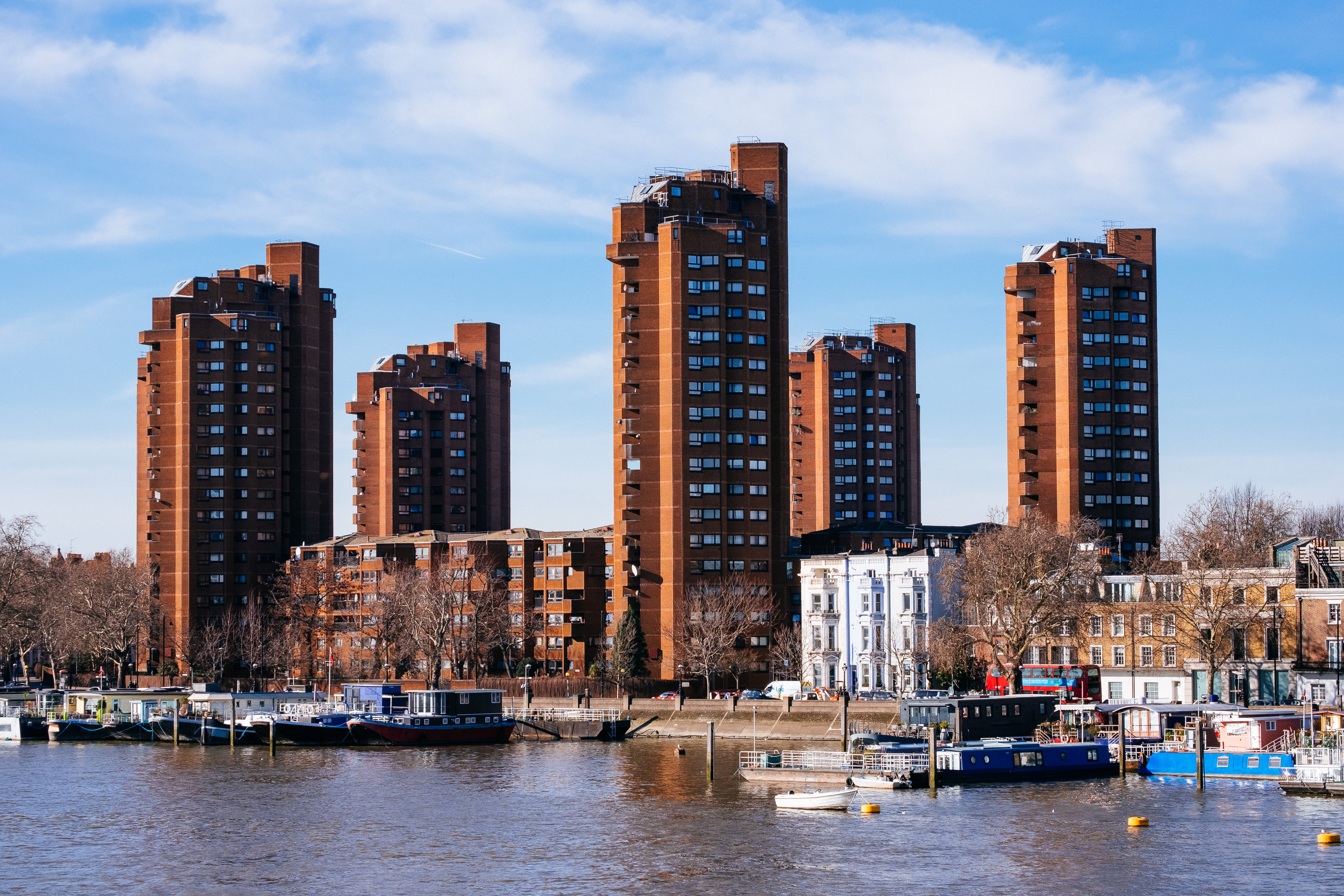

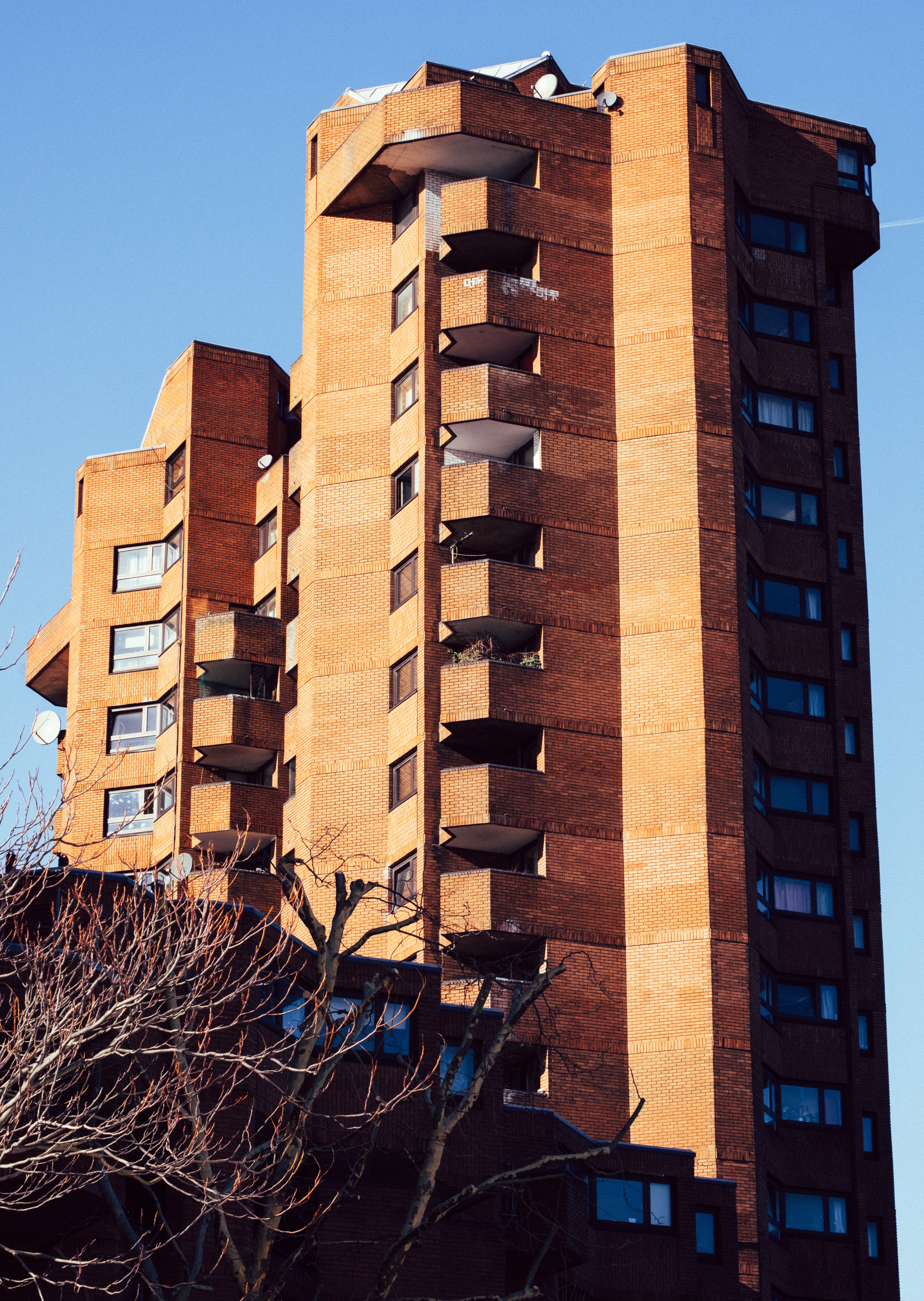

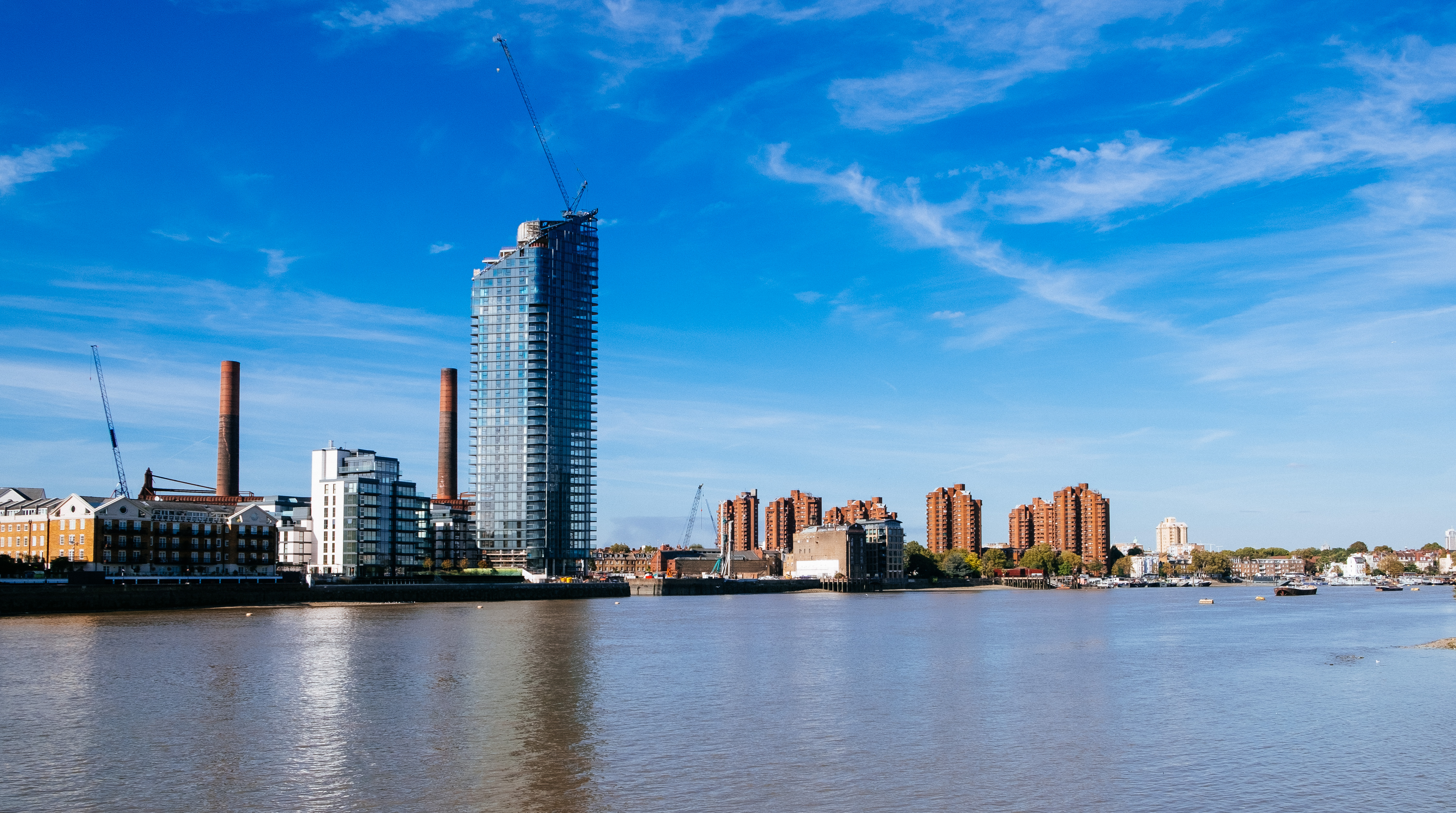

== Transport ==
The nearest stations are:

- Imperial Wharf (London Overground)
- Fulham Broadway (London Underground)
- Sloane Square (London Underground)

Bus route 328 serves there as a terminal point.
