= The World's End, Camden =

The World's End
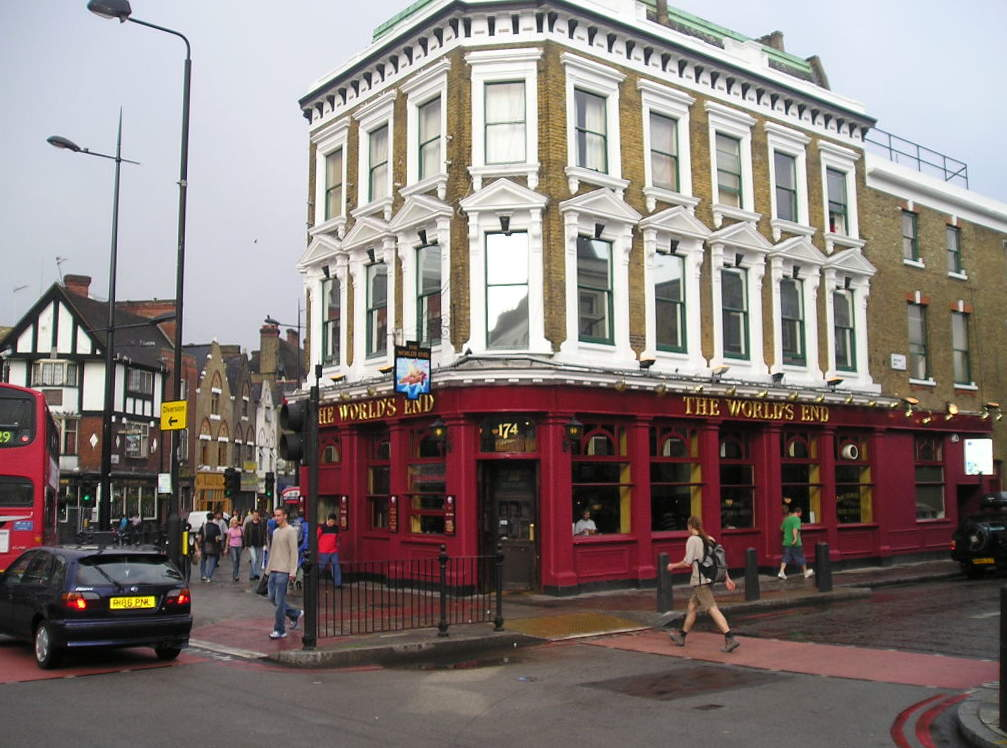
- The pub in 2005

- Location within London Borough of Camden
- Former names: Mother Red Cap; Mother Damnable's

General information
- Location: Camden Town, London, United Kingdom, 174 Camden High Street; Camden Town; London; NW1 0NE
- Coordinates: 51°32′20.872″N 0°8′32.161″W
- Elevation: 27 metres (89 ft)

Website
- theworldsend.co.uk

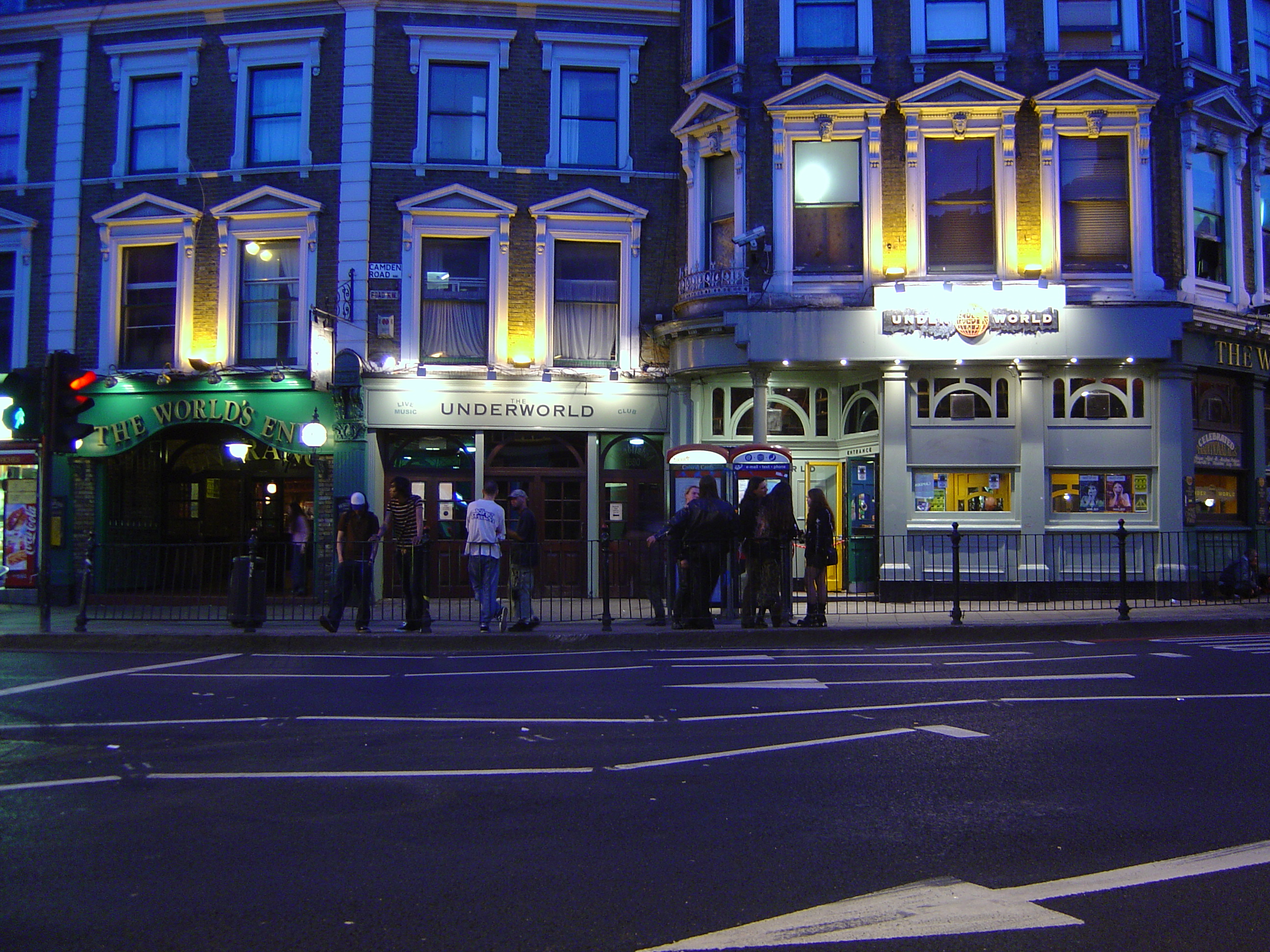
The World's End in the evening, located next door to the Underworld Club

The World's End is a pub and music venue at 174 Camden High Street in Camden Town, London, England, just south of Camden Town tube station with an additional branch at Finsbury Park, 23 Stroud Green Rd, London. It is a long established business, formerly known as Mother Red Cap or Mother Damnable's.

== Mother Red Cap and Mother Damnable's ==
The first reference to a tavern in the area occurs in 1690. At that time the locality was entirely rural and the proprietors relied on trade passing by on the road from London to Hampstead and Highgate. The name Halfway House was accordingly also used. It is not clear whether there was one establishment in the first half of the 18th century or two, but by 1751 the Mother Red Cap and the Mother Black Cap (later renamed The Black Cap) were both in business. The location was at or near the location of the cottage of a famous supposed witch, Mother Damnable. In the late 18th century the Mother Red Cap was at its present location, and it had acquired a tea garden. Camden Road was later built across the grounds, and the building was reconstructed. The present building dates from 1875 and was designed by H. H. Bridgman.

== The World's End ==
The pub and venue in its present large guise is the work of Andrew Marler, a serial developer of Licensed Premises, who owned it as a 200 capacity pub and in 1988 bought the whole 'island site' on which it stands. He then enlarged the pub to a capacity of 1,000 and built the 500 capacity Underworld venue beneath the pub. Marler went on in 1994 to buy the BBC Television Theatre from the BBC and refurbish and launch the site as The Shepherd's Bush Empire, continuing with the business model of selling drinks to customers whilst being professionally entertained.

The World's End and its Underworld Club have won Venue of the Year and hosted bands/artists like Dave Stewart, The Cranberries, Stuck Mojo, The Datsuns, The Darkness and Radiohead, as well as a host of extreme metal bands.

== See also ==
- The World's End, Chelsea
