= The World's End, Chelsea =

Pub in Chelsea, London

The World's End
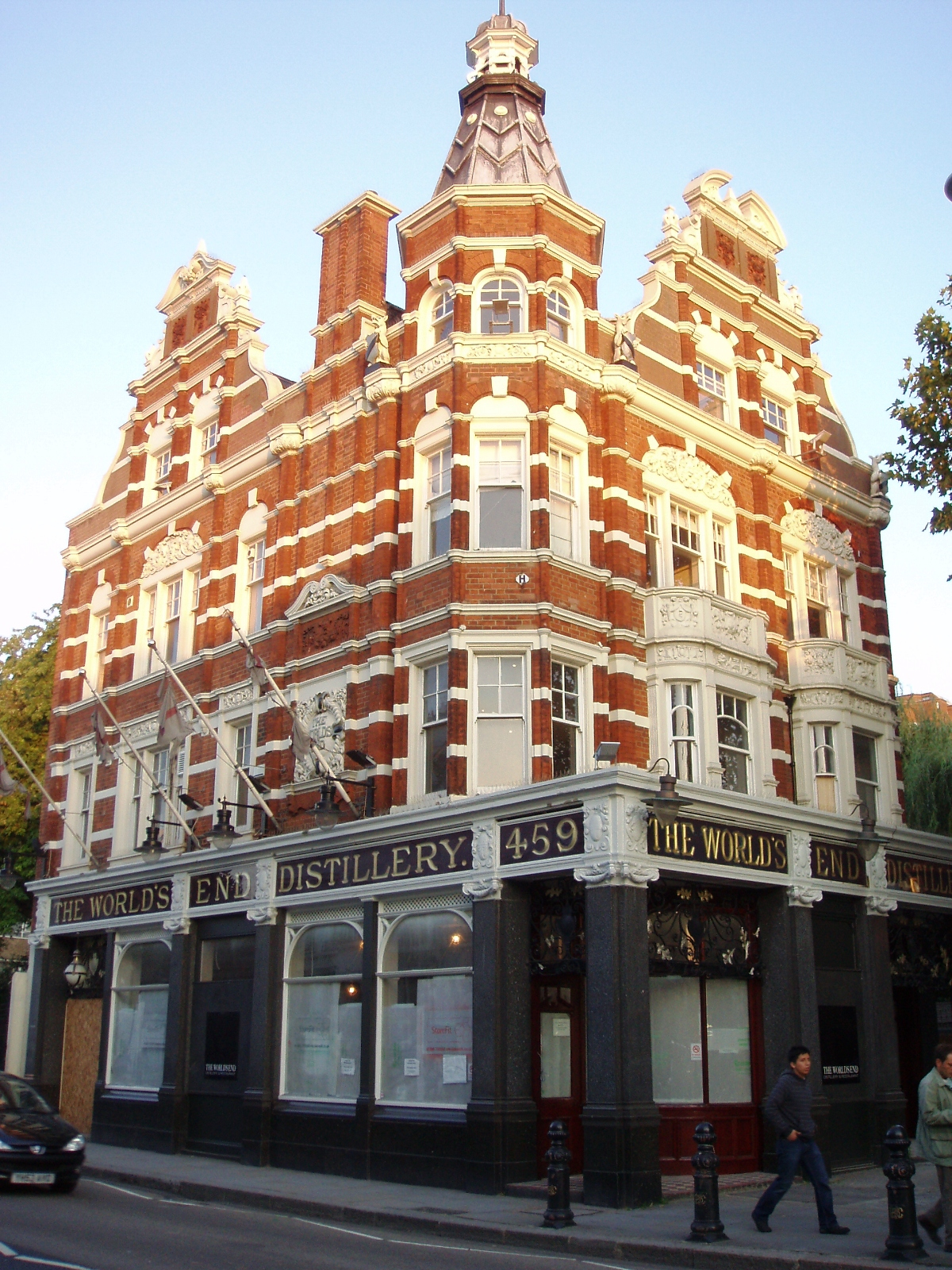
- The World's End

- Location within Royal Borough of Kensington and Chelsea Location within Greater London

General information
- Location: 459 King's Road, Chelsea, London, England
- Coordinates: 51°28′55″N 0°10′47″W
- Completed: 1897

Design and construction
- Designations

Listed Building – Grade II
- Official name: The World's End Distillery
- Designated: 28 April 2006
- Reference no.: 1391649

The World's End is a Grade II listed public house and restaurant at 459 King's Road, Chelsea, London. It gives its name to the surrounding area at the western end of the King's Road.

== History ==
It was built in 1897, but the architect is not known. Historic England calls it "a fine example of a public house in the gin-palace genre".

The current building replaced earlier buildings, one of which is shown on the north side of Kings Road on the 1795 map; Cary's New And Accurate Plan Of London And Westminster. The old tavern was a noted house of entertainment in the reign of Charles II. The grounds and tea gardens were extensive and it was elegantly fitted out. The house was probably called "The World's End" because of its then considerable distance from London and the bad and dangerous state of the roads leading to it. As it stood close to the River Thames most of the visitors made the journey by boat.

== Earlier buildings ==
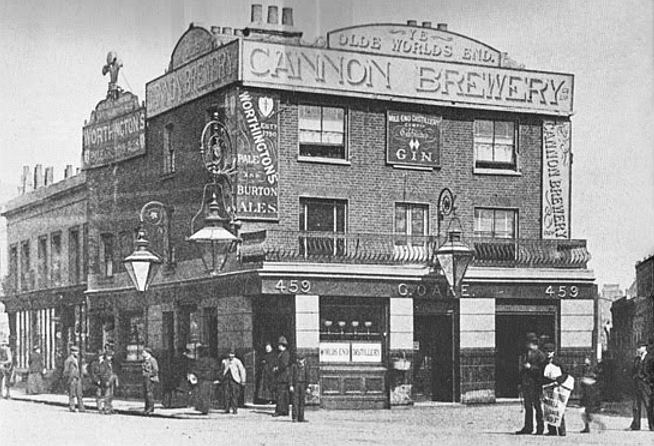
The Olde World's End Tavern, c.1894

== See also ==
- The World's End, Camden
