= Phoenix Rising (novel series) =

Children's novels

- Elissa's Quest; Elissa's Odyssey; World's End
- Author: Erica Verrillo
- Country: United States
- Language: English
- Genre: Fantasy
- Publisher: Random House
- Published: 2007 - 2009
- Media type: Print, e-book
- No. of books: 3

Phoenix Rising is a trilogy of children's novels written by Erica Verrillo. It is composed of three books released between 2007 and 2009, Elissa's Quest, Elissa's Odyssey and World's End.

== Synopsis ==
=== Elissa's Quest ===
Elissa is a thirteen-year-old girl living with her caretaker Nana in a peaceful valley. She knows little about her parents, as her mother is dead and Nana will not tell Elissa the identity of her father. Secrets are not new to Elissa, as she has long since had to keep others from learning that she has the ability to speak to animals. Despite her peaceful existence, Elissa has grown bored of her town and as such, willingly leaves when a visitor comes to whisk her away to his kingdom. As the danger around her grows thicker with every passing moment, Elissa must try to find a way to keep herself safe and alive, especially after hearing rumors that she might be the fulfillment of the prophecy of the Phoenix.

=== Elissa's Odyssey ===
Elissa has discovered her father's true identity and fallen into more trouble. She has been separated from her friends, Maya and Gertrude the donkey, but has managed to evade the evil Khan. On top of this her power has begun to change, as Elissa can now speak to plants as well as animals - something that seems to be a part of the Prophecy of the Phoenix.

=== World's End ===
Elissa has now become a princess, something that many girls dream of. The reality is far from a dream for Elissa as she learns that she must not only look and act the part, but that she's also expected to give up her former friends, who are not considered to be appropriate company for a princess. She's also expected to marry an awful older man that she could not possibly ever love. However the Prophecy is not finished with Elissa, as she is drawn ever more towards its end.

== Reception ==
Critical reception for the Phoenix Rising series has been positive. Booklist and the Bulletin of the Center for Children's Books both praised the first book in the series, with the Bulletin of the Center for Children's Books stating that "The enchanting desert city and its creatively conceived denizens, like the vultures that attempt to situate Elissa on their family tree ("Is that Sam's daughter?"), elevate a standard story to an absorbing and even amusing adventure." Booklist also gave a favorable review for Elissa's Odyssey, writing "Once again, the story's humor pairs with riveting action that mounts to a startling conclusion, boding well for the finale of the Phoenix Rising trilogy."
