= Land's End Plantation (Stonewall, Louisiana) =

Historic house in Louisiana, United States

- Formerly listed on the U.S. National Register of Historic Places
- Location within Louisiana Location within the United States
- Location: End of Parish Road 793, 0.5 miles (0.80 km) north of Red Bluff Road, about 5 miles (8.0 km) southeast of Stonewall
- Nearest city: Stonewall, Louisiana
- Coordinates: 32°14′50″N 93°44′49″W
- Area: 200 acres (81 ha)
- Built: 1835
- Architectural style: Greek Revival
- NRHP reference No.: 72001453

Significant dates
- Added to NRHP: April 26, 1972
- Removed from NRHP: March 19, 2024

The Land's End Plantation in Stonewall, Louisiana, was established in 1835 by Colonel Henry and Ben Marshall, signer of the Louisiana Ordinance of Secession and the constitution of the Confederate States of America. The house, built in 1857, was used as a hospital following the Battle of Mansfield in 1864.

The plantation house, along with a 200 acres (81 ha) area comprising several buildings, was listed on the National Register of Historic Places on April 26, 1972.

The plantation house was completely destroyed by fire in 1989, and was subsequently removed from the National Register in 2024.

== See also ==
- National Register of Historic Places listings in DeSoto Parish, Louisiana
