= Curtis Island =

Curtis Island may refer to:

- Curtis Island (Queensland), an island in Australia
  - Curtis Island, Queensland, a locality in the Gladstone Region in Australia
  - Curtis Island National Park, Queensland
- Curtis Island (Tasmania), Australia
- Curtis Island, New Zealand, in the Kermadec Islands
- Curtis Island (Maine), in the United States
  - Curtis Island Light, Maine
