= HMS Conway =

Four ships and a shore establishment of the Royal Navy have been named HMS Conway after the River Conwy in North Wales, formerly known by its English name of Conway. Two were launched as Conway, while another two were renamed:

- HMS Conway (1814) was a 20-gun sixth rate launched in 1814 and sold in 1825; she became the merchantman and whaler Toward Castle and was wrecked in 1838
- HMS Conway (1832) was a 26-gun sixth rate launched in 1832. She became a training ship in 1859, was renamed Winchester in 1861 and was broken up in 1871.
- HMS Conway (school ship) was a training establishment set up in 1859 aboard the second HMS Conway. This vessel was replaced by two others:
  - HMS Winchester was HMS Conway from 1861 until 1876, when she was renamed HMS Mount Edgecombe.
  - HMS Nile was HMS Conway from 1876 until 1953 when she ran aground and broke her back. The wreck burned to the waterline in 1956. The school continued as a stone frigate until 1974.

== See also ==
- Two ships of the Royal Navy named HMS Conway Castle.
- Two ships of the United States Navy named USS Conway.
