= Conway House (Camden, Maine) =

Historic house in Maine, United States

- U.S. National Register of Historic Places
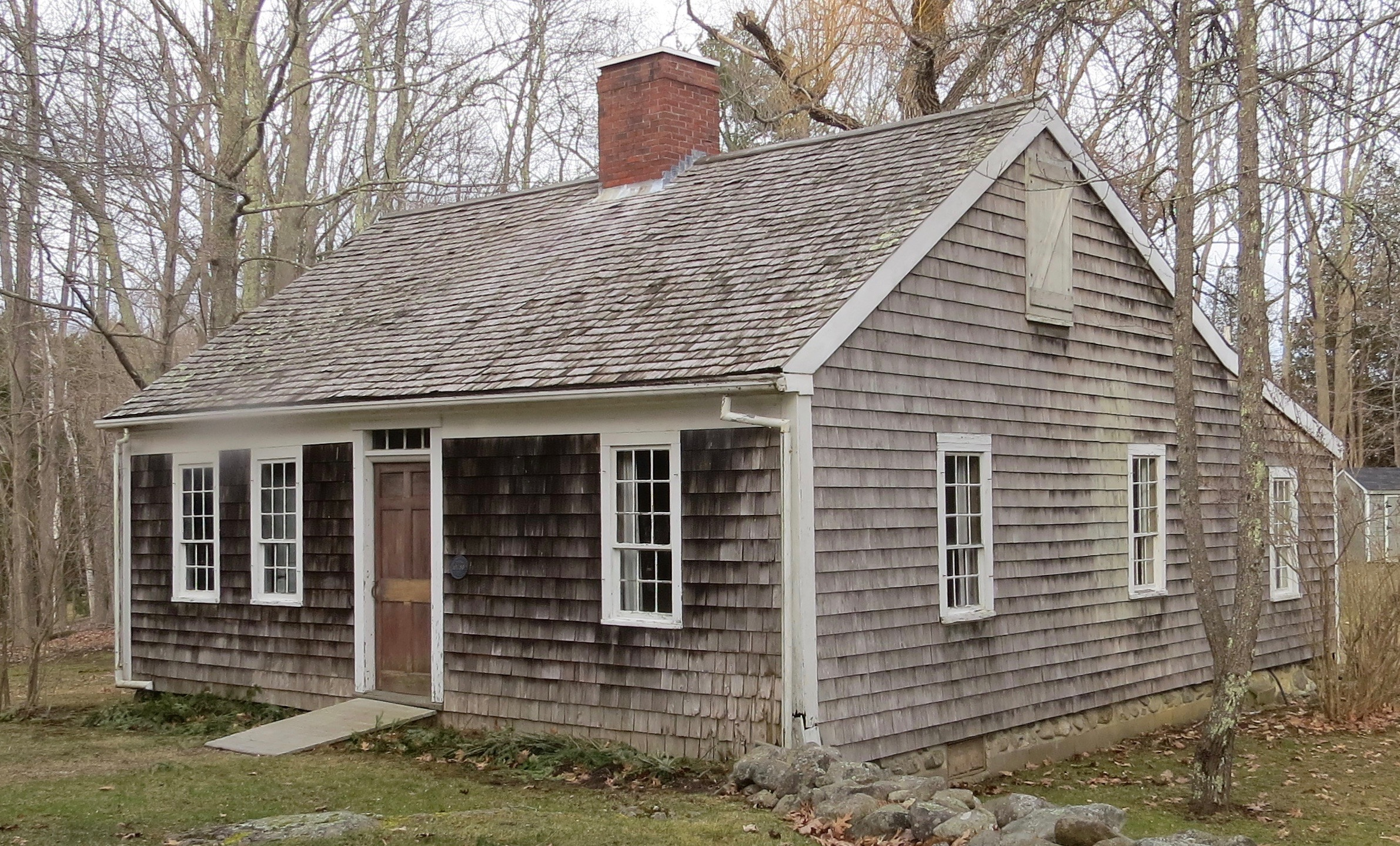
- House in 2016

- Location within Maine Location within the United States
- Location: Conway Rd., Camden, Maine
- Coordinates: 44°12′1″N 69°4′52″W
- Area: 2 acres (0.81 ha)
- Built: 1775
- Architectural style: Cape Cod
- NRHP reference No.: 69000010
- Added to NRHP: December 23, 1969

The Conway House is an historic house and museum in Rockport and Camden, Maine. Probably built in the 1770s, it is one of the oldest surviving buildings in Knox County. It was added to the National Register of Historic Places in 1969.

== Description ==
The Conway House stands near the southern border of Camden and the northern border of Rockport, on the northwest side of United States Route 1 between it and Conway Road. Its access road is on US 1. The house is a 1 1/2-story Cape style wood-frame structure, four bays wide, with a central chimney. It was apparently built on the foundation of an older house, possibly dating to the early 18th century. The timber framing of the house is rough, with tree bark evident on some of its beams, and axe and adze markings on the beams and some trim elements.

== History ==
Conway House was built around 1770 by Robert Thorndike, the first White settler in Camden. Thorndike's son Robert Jr. was born in the house in 1773, who was one of the first White children born in the area. He bought the lot for $65 and lived in the home until 1825, when Frederick Conway bought the home. It was the home of US Navy quartermaster William Conway. The property stayed in the Conway family until 1916.

By 1961, the property was in rundown condition and was purchased by Ambrose Cramer and donated to the Camden-Rockport Historical Society, who subsequently restored and furnished the building with 18th and early 19th century items. It was opened to the public as a museum in 1962. The Camden Garden Club landscaped the property and restored the plants common to the area prior to 1860.

== Conway Homestead & Cramer Museum ==
Today the Camden-Rockport Historical Society operates the museum as the Conway Homestead & Cramer Museum. The property includes the Conway House, the Cramer Museum with displays from the Society's collections of local historic artifacts, a barn with a display of carriages, sleighs and tools, a blacksmith shop, a maple sugaring house, and an education center.
