= CC1 =

CC1, CC-1 or cc1 may refer to:

- cc1, the first phase of the C compiler in the GNU Compiler Collection
- CC-1, the hull designation for the first US battlecruiser that was finished as the Lexington-class aircraft carrier Lexington (CV-2)
- HMCS CC-1, a Royal Canadian Navy submarine
- CIÉ No. CC1, an experimental Irish steam locomotive
- CC1, a data channel used in Line 21 closed captioning
- Southern Railway (UK) CC1, an electric locomotive of the type later known as British Rail Class 70
- CC1, a hovercraft built by Cushioncraft
- Dhoby Ghaut MRT station, Singapore

== See also ==
- CCI (disambiguation)
