= CCI =

CCI may refer to:

== Companies ==
- Coca-Cola İçecek, Coca-Cola bottler
- Castleton Commodities International, a global commodities trading firm headquartered in Stamford, Connecticut
- CCI (ammunition), known as CCI/Speer or Speer/CCI, a manufacturer of rimfire ammunition, centerfire handgun ammunition, and primers
- CCI Europe, a Danish software company
- Cement Corporation of India, Indian Government Owned Corporation
- Cinema City International, which operates cinemas in Israel and Europe
- Cleveland-Cliffs, an Iron mining company
- Compal Communications, Inc, a manufacturer of mobile phones
- Computer Consoles Inc., a former telephony and computer company located in Rochester, New York
- Concurrent Controls, Inc., a former developer of Concurrent DOS and Multiuser DOS
- Consolidated Communications, an American telecommunications company
- Custom Coasters International, a manufacturer of wooden roller coasters
- Crown Castle
- Coon Chicken Inn, defunct American restaurant chain

== Institutions and organizations ==
- Canadian Condominium Institute
- Canadian Conservation Institute, a Canadian government conservation agency
- Canine Companions for Independence
- Center for Citizen Initiatives
- Center for Computational Innovations, supercomputing centre at the Rensselaer Polytechnic Institute, USA
- Center for Copyright Information
- Center for Creative Imaging
- Chinese Culinary Institute, a cooking school in Hong Kong
- Classic College International
- Co-Counselling International
- Competition Commission of India
- Council of Common Interests, Pakistan
- Cross Cancer Institute, the comprehensive cancer centre for northern Alberta, Canada
- Iowa Citizens for Community Improvement, a non-profit activist organization based in Des Moines, Iowa
- MIT Center for Collective Intelligence

=== Prisons ===
- California Correctional Institution, state prison in California, United States
- Central Correctional Institution, state prison in South Carolina (demolished 1999)
- Chillicothe Correctional Institution, a state prison in Ohio, United States
- Columbia Correctional Institution, a state prison in Wisconsin, United States
- Columbus Correctional Institution, a prison in North Carolina, United States

== Sports ==
- CCI Phantom, a pump action paintball marker
- Collegiate Championship Invitational, an American rugby sevens tournament
- Concours Complet International, the competition rating for the equestrian sport of eventing
  - CCI5*, the highest level
- Cricket Club of India, in Mumbai

== Technology ==
- Cache Coherent Interconnect, a feature of ARM big.LITTLE processors
- Clustered columnstore index, a type of database table introduced in SQL Server 2012
- Co-channel interference, a problem in radio communications
- Coded-Call Indicator, used to display telephone numbers in the (obsolete) Director telephone system
- Command Control Interface, a Hitachi software
- Communication-Centric Intelligence Satellite (CCI-Sat), an Indian spy satellite under development
- Common Client Interface, part of the Java EE Connector Architecture
- Controlled Cryptographic Item
- Copy Control Information
- The first type of Current conveyor, an electronic ideal concept as well as practical device

== Other ==
- 201, in Roman numerals
- IATA identifier "CCI" for Capital Cargo International Airlines
- Charlson Comorbidity Index
- Citizens Commission of Inquiry into war crimes in Vietnam
- Comic Con India, Indian comic con
- Commodity Channel Index
- Consumer Confidence Index
- Craniocervical instability, a medical condition where there is excessive movement between the skull and the top two vertebrae
- Cultural and Creative Industries
