= USS Conway =

Two ships of the United States Navy have been named Conway, after William Conway, who refused to haul down his country's flag during the surrender of the Pensacola Navy Yard.

- USS Conway (DD-70), a new name for the Caldwell-class destroyer USS Craven (DD-70), launched in 1918 and renamed in 1939. She was transferred to the Royal Navy as HMS Lewes, in 1940. She was scrapped in 1945.
- USS Conway (DD-507), a Fletcher-class destroyer, launched in 1942 and struck in 1969.
