= Eva Maria Brown =

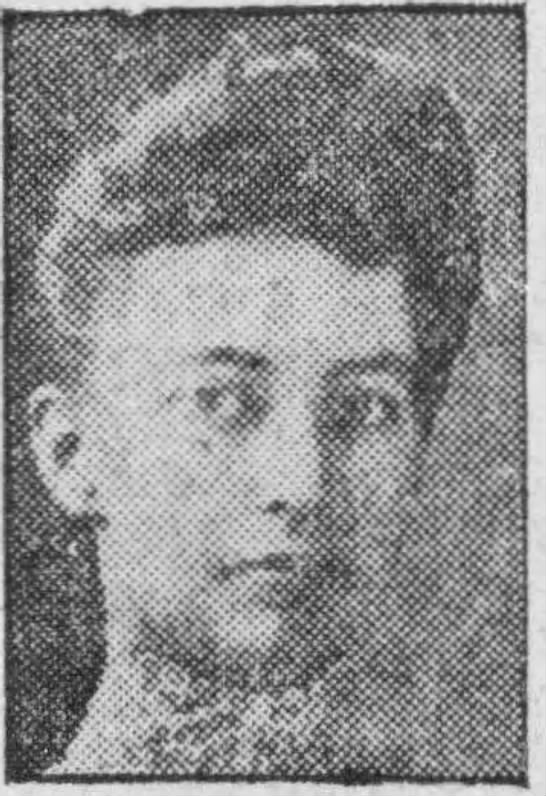
- Born: December 27, 1856; Camden, Maine, U.S.
- Died: February 12, 1917 (aged 60); Quincy, Massachusetts, U.S.
- Occupations: social reformer; temperance activist; legislative agent; writer
- Known for: temperance movement
- Notable work: Laws of Massachusetts relating to intoxicating liquors (1905)

Eva Maria Brown (December 27, 1856 – February 12, 1917) was an American social reformer in the temperance movement. She was the only woman in New England in her day who was registered as legislative agent and counsel, entitling her to conduct hearings before the various Massachusetts government committees and of cross-examining witnesses. Brown was the author of Laws of Massachusetts relating to intoxicating liquors (1905), which was accepted as a standard in legal cases and passed through eleven editions.

== Early life and education ==
Eva Maria Brown was born in Camden, Maine, December 27, 1856, being the only child of John and Matilda Jane (Mathews) Brown. When she was two years old, her parents moved to Liberty, Maine. Her father, John Brown, 2d, who was a native of Palermo, Maine, enlisted in the army, during the Civil War, being signeil to the Third Maine Regiment and later transferred to the Seventeenth. The exposure and hardships of a soldier's life brought on disease, from which he died at City Point, Virginia, in 1864, after thirteen months' service. His wife, Matilda J. Brown (born 1830, Lincolnville, Maine), was the daughter of Archibald and Betsey (Knights) Mathews.

On the death of Mr. Brown, his widow removed from Liberty to Augusta, Maine, where her daughter was educated. While a pupil at the high school in that city, Brown was a classmate of Harriet and Alice, the daughters of James G. Blaine. She graduated from the Augusta High School with high honors, being noted as one of the best scholars in her class.

Early in life, Brown received fundamental training in temperance work. While a child, she became a member of a Cold Water Temple organized at Augusta by General Joshua Nye, and for several terms, held the office of Chief Templar of that society. Soon after leaving the high school, she removed with her mother to Massachusetts.

== Career ==
Brown's connection with the temperance movement in Massachusetts dated from the fall of 1878, when she first entered the employ of Henry Hardwick Faxon, the temperance reformer. Faxon was then at the height of his power, conducting such vigorous campaigns against the liquor traffic and in support of morality and an uplifting home life as never before had been witnessed in the Commonwealth. About this time, Brown joined the orders of the Sons of Temperance and the Good Templars, in which she was attained the highest official positions. Her duties in Faxon's office were at first those of an assistant clerk. Her abilities, however, were soon recognized by Faxon and he promoted her to the position of chief clerk. In 1884, she became private secretary to Henry Munroe Faxon (1864–1949)'s (son of Henry H. Faxon).

She was made chief clerk of the Constitutional Prohibitory Amendment Campaign Committee in 1889, of which Colonel Edward H. Haskell, of Newton, was chair, having charge of the correspondence and the assignment of the speakers.

About 1892, Brown began her career at the Massachusetts State House. At first, she did not like the work, owing to the publicity it entailed, but she soon became familiar with the details of legislative routine. The universal courtesy shown her, and the assistance accorded by the members of the General Court, were important factors in her legislative successes. From 1898 to 1904, she passed a great deal of time during the legislative sessions, looking after the different bills affecting the liquor question, the Sunday laws, and other subjects. At the time, Brown held the distinction of being the only woman in New England who was registered as legislative agent and counsel. The authority thus conferred entitled her to the privileges of conducting hearings before the various committees and of cross-examining witnesses. In 1896, she conducted one of the most important hearings ever held at the State House, when the bill authorizing the payment to the State of the entire sum received as fees from liquor licenses was being considered.

The management of the Faxon Political Temperance Bureau was publicly transferred to Brown on March 22, 1902, although for several years previous to that date, she had been the director of Faxon's work. During his crusade in enforcing the liquor laws in his home city, Quincy, Faxon brought more than 500 cases before the courts, the testimony in nearly all of which, both in the upper and lower courts, was taken by Brown. This experience proved of inestimable value to her, and she took advantage of it in later years.

The correspondence of the Faxon Political Temperance Bureau, of which Brown became the sole manager, was almost unlimited, and covered more phases of the reform than that of any other temperance society. She was in constant communication with municipal officers and citizens interested in the enforcement of the laws. Besides preparing and editing numerous circulars, pamphlets, and articles for the press, she compiled The Laws of Massachusetts relating to intoxicating liquors (Boston, 1905). The work was accepted as a standard in legal cases and passed through eleven editions.

Brown was a director of the Massachusetts Total Abstinence Society, serving upon all of its important committees. The served as clerk of the corporation, holding the position for many years, and resigning in 1901. She was a trustee of the Massachusetts Anti-Saloon League, and a member of the International Order of the King's Daughters and Sons.

In 1910, she retired from active work.

== Personal life ==
In Boston, on August 27, 1900, she married Bertraum Edwin Busteed (1869–1946). (Note: According to Marquis (1915), Brown was unmarried.)

Brown made her home in Quincy, Massachusetts. She was connected with the parish of the First Unitarian Church, but she was also a Christian Scientist.

Eva Maria Brown died at Quincy, Massachusetts, February 12, 1917.

== Selected works ==
- Laws of Massachusetts relating to intoxicating liquors, common nuisances, gaming, innholders and common victuallers, Lord's day, penalties for drunkenness, etc. Also a digest of the Decisions of the Supreme judicial court concerning these matters. (1905)
