= Curtis Island Light =

Lighthouse in Maine, US

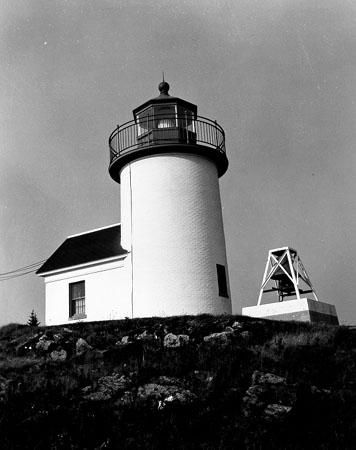
- US Coast Guard photo
- Location: Outside of Camden Harbor in Penobscot Bay, Camden, Maine
- Coordinates: 44°12′4.918″N 69°2′55.891″W

Tower
- Constructed: 1835
- Construction: brick
- Automated: 1972
- Height: 7.5 m (25 ft)
- Shape: Cylindrical brick tower
- Markings: White
- Heritage: National Register of Historic Places listed place
- Fog signal: none

Light
- First lit: 1896 (current structure)
- Focal height: 52 feet (16 m)
- Range: 6 nautical miles (11 km; 6.9 mi)
- Characteristic: Oc G 4s
- Curtis Island Light
- U.S. National Register of Historic Places
- Area: 5.5 acres (2.2 ha)
- NRHP reference No.: 73000263
- Added to NRHP: May 17, 1973

Curtis Island Light, originally Negro Island Light, is a lighthouse marking the approach to the harbor of Camden, Maine. It is on Curtis Island, which shelters the harbor from ocean storms. It was first established in 1835, and the present structure was built in 1896. The light was automated in 1972 and listed on the National Register of Historic Places in 1973.

== Description and history ==
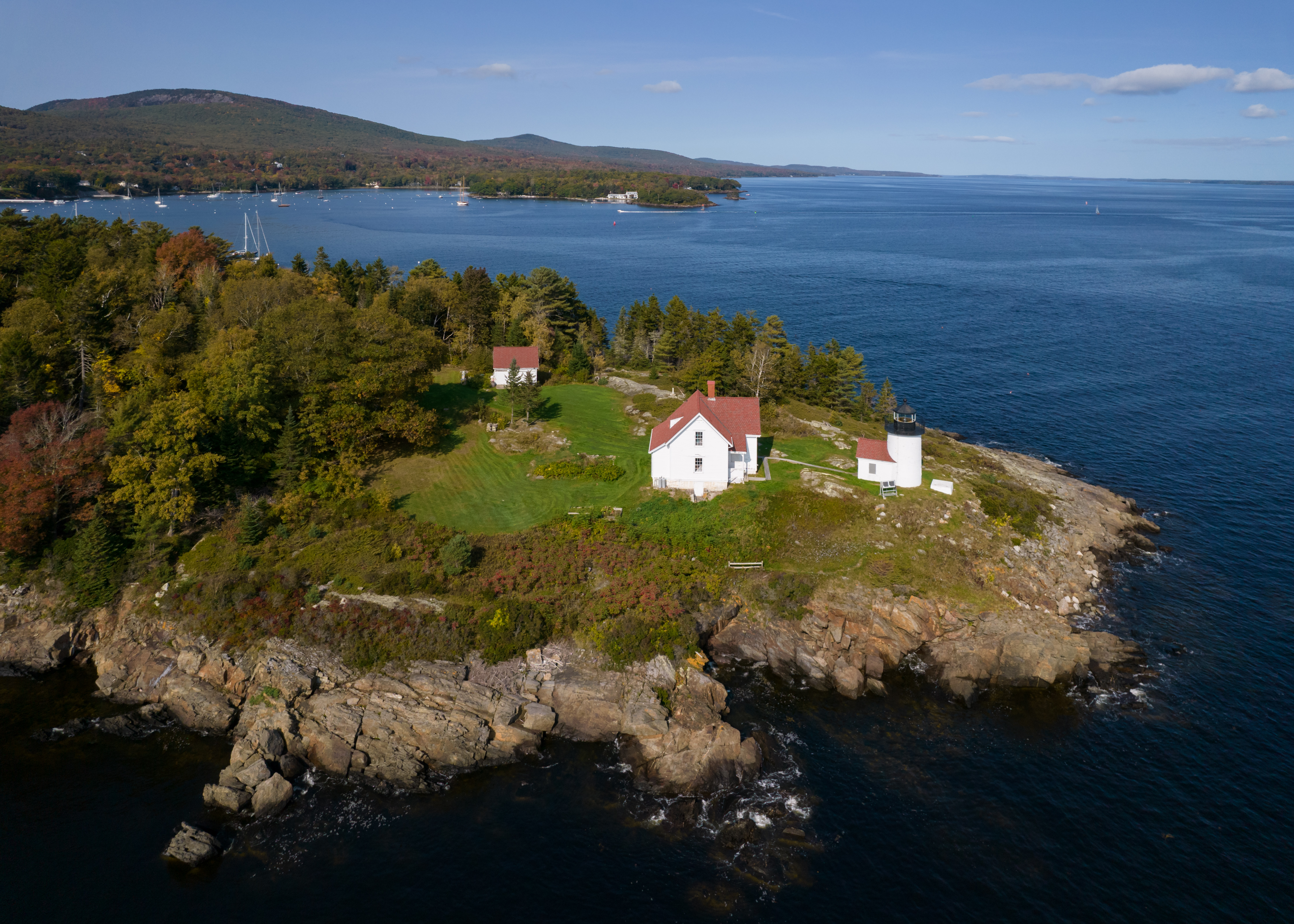
Aerial view of Curtis Island Light on Curtis Island

Curtis Island is a 5-acre (2.0 ha) teardrop-shaped island off Dillingham Point, which marks the southern end of Camden Harbor. The island is mostly wooded, with a cleared area at its southeastern end where the lighthouse is located. The light station complex consists of a circular brick tower, a 1 1/2-story wood frame keeper's house, a small brick oil house, and a toolshed. The dock is located at the sheltered northwest end of the island, with a path (one of several on the island) connecting the two areas.

The island was known as Negro Island until 1934, when it was renamed Curtis Island in honor of Cyrus H. K. Curtis, a publisher and philanthropist who was a frequent visitor. The light was authorized in 1835 and went into service in 1836. The present keeper's house was built in 1889 on the foundation of the original keeper's house, and the light tower was built in 1896. In addition to serving as a marker for the Camden Harbor entrance, the station also served as a signal tower for Bangor-bound ships.

In 1970, a group of local citizens convinced the United States Coast Guard to turn the light over to the town rather than auction it off. The island is now a town park. The light was automated in 1972, and the property is managed by a town-hired caretaker.

== See also ==
- National Register of Historic Places listings in Knox County, Maine
