= Camden National Bank =

Bank with branches in Maine and New Hampshire, United States

Camden National Corporation
- Type: Public
- Traded as: Nasdaq: CAC; Russell 2000 Index component
- Industry: Financial services
- Founded: January 1875
- Headquarters: Camden, Maine, United States
- Number of locations: 71 retail financial services, 76 ATMs
- Area served: Maine, New Hampshire, Massachusetts (lending offices)
- Key people: Simon Griffiths (president & CEO); Michael J. Archer (CFO); Marie McCarthy (Chair of the Board)
- Revenue: ▲$240.1 million (2024)
- Net income: ▲$53.0 million (2024)
- Total assets: ▲$7.0 billion (2025)
- Total equity: ▲$701.95 million (market cap, 2025)
- Number of employees: 650+
- Divisions: Camden National Wealth Management, Acadia Trust
- Website: camdennational.bank

Camden National Bank is a commercial bank headquartered in Camden, Maine, operating as the principal subsidiary of Camden National Corporation (Nasdaq: CAC), a publicly traded bank holding company. Founded in 1875, the bank became a direct, wholly owned subsidiary of the holding company following a corporate reorganization in 1984. Following the 2025 merger with Northway Financial, the combined institution has approximately $7.0 billion in assets.

The bank operates commercial and consumer banking services, including wealth management and trust services, serving individuals, businesses, municipalities, and non-profit organizations in Maine and New Hampshire.

== History ==
=== Founding and maritime economy era (1875-1920) ===
Camden National Bank was established in January 1875 during Camden's industrial expansion period. By 1886, the town's industrial base included foundry products, railroad cars, woolens, paper mill feltings, anchors, maritime hardware, planking, powder kegs, excelsior, mattresses, tinware, oakum, textiles, boots, shoes, leather goods, flour, meal, corn brooms, and barrels. Camden was the second-largest producer of lime in the region after Rockland, with limestone quarried locally and processed in kilns before shipment to ports throughout the United States.

The bank's founding occurred during Camden's prominence as a maritime center. The town's shipbuilding industry reached its peak in the late 19th century, with the H.M. Bean Yard launching vessels including the Charlotte A. Maxwell, the largest four-masted schooner of its time, and the George W. Wells, the first six-masted schooner ever constructed. During this period, Maine's lumber industry dominated regional commerce. By 1830, Bangor, Maine had become the world's largest lumber shipping port, moving over 8.7 billion board feet of timber over the following sixty years.

=== Economic transitions and incorporation (1920-1984) ===
The bank weathered significant economic challenges including the Panic of 1893, Great Depression, and both World Wars. After the Civil War, the railroads and the Industrial Revolution gradually brought an end to the shipping industry that had made Maine the most prosperous state in the Union. As more and more goods were manufactured in America, Americans no longer needed to import those goods from Europe.

=== Corporate restructuring and modern banking (1984-present) ===
The Company was founded in 1984, went public in 1997 and is now registered with NASDAQ Global Market ("NASDAQ") under the ticker symbol "CAC." This restructuring positioned the institution for significant growth in the subsequent decades.

The bank's main office was relocated to 2 Elm Street in Camden, Maine, on March 23, 1987. This move coincided with increased investment in modernizing operations and expanding the bank's service offerings.

=== Strategic acquisitions (2000-2025) ===
Camden National completed several acquisitions to expand geographically in Maine:

Acquisitions include:

- UnitedKingfield Bank (September 30, 2006) - Bangor, Maine
- Union Trust Company (January 3, 2008) - Ellsworth, Maine
- The Bank of Maine (October 16, 2015) - Portland, Maine. The merger added 55,000 customers.
- Acadia Trust, National Association (December 1, 2016) - Portland, Maine
- Northway Financial Inc. (January 2, 2025) - New Hampshire. The combined institution has $7.0 billion in assets and 73 branches.

=== Northway Financial merger ===
On September 10, 2024, Camden National announced an agreement to acquire Northway Financial Inc., the parent company of Northway Bank, in an all-stock transaction valued at approximately $87 million. The merger closed on January 2, 2025, creating a combined institution with $7.0 billion in assets and 73 branches in Maine and New Hampshire.

The transaction was Camden National's first acquisition outside of Maine. Systems conversion was completed in mid-March 2025.

== Operations ==
=== Geographic footprint ===
Camden National operates through a network of 71 branches and 76 ATMs across its market areas:

- Maine: 55 branches
- New Hampshire: 16 branches following the Northway acquisition

The bank also maintains commercial loan production offices in Massachusetts and provides online lending platforms for residential mortgages and small commercial loans.

=== Service offerings ===
Camden National provides comprehensive financial services including:

Banking Services:

- Commercial and industrial lending
- Commercial real estate financing
- Residential mortgages (1-4 family properties)
- Consumer and home equity loans
- Business and personal checking/savings accounts
- Certificates of deposit
- Digital and mobile banking platforms

Specialized Services:

- Treasury management services
- Small Business Administration (SBA) lending
- Equipment and vehicle financing
- Construction and development loans

=== Subsidiaries and divisions ===
Camden National Wealth Management provides investment management, financial planning, retirement planning, and estate planning services.

Acadia Trust, N.A. operates as the bank's trust division, offering fiduciary services, asset management, and trust solutions through offices in Portland, Bangor, and Ellsworth.

Healthcare Professional Funding provides financing for dental, veterinary, and eye care providers.

== Leadership ==
=== Executive management ===
- Simon Griffiths - President and Chief Executive Officer
- Michael J. Archer - Executive Vice President and Chief Financial Officer
- Barbara Raths, CTP - Executive Vice President, Commercial Banking

=== Board of directors ===
The bank's board includes business leaders from across Northern New England. Following the Northway merger completion, Camden National appointed Larry K. Haynes to Camden National's Board of Directors and Audit Committee. Mr. Haynes previously served on Northway's Board of Directors. Marie J. McCarthy was appointed as Chair of the Board following the announcement of Larry J. Sterrs retirement.

== Regional economic role ==
=== Maine banking sector ===
Camden National Bank operates 55 branches in Maine, making it the second-largest bank in the state by branch count and ranking 134th nationally.

=== Community development ===
The bank operates as a Community Reinvestment Act lender and maintains partnerships with the Finance Authority of Maine (FAME) for small business lending.

== Industry context and competitive position ==
=== Northern New England banking consolidation ===
Camden National's acquisition activity reflects regional banking consolidation trends. According to Gerard Cassidy, RBC Capital Markets' Portland-based banking analyst, consolidation momentum in the sector was expected to accelerate during 2024-2025.

== Regulatory and compliance ==
Camden National Bank operates under a national charter and is regulated by the Office of the Comptroller of the Currency (OCC). The bank's deposits are insured by the Federal Deposit Insurance Corporation (FDIC) up to applicable limits. As a member of the Federal Reserve System, the bank maintains the FDIC certificate number 4255 and Fed RSSD ID 593007.

== Industry recognition ==
Camden National has received workplace recognition awards.

== See also ==
- List of largest banks in the United States
- Banking in the United States
