= U.S. National Toboggan Championships =

The U.S. National Toboggan Championships is the only organized wooden toboggan race in the country and possibly the world. The toboggan chute is located in Camden, Maine, at the Camden Snow Bowl, a community-owned year-round recreation area which has developed thousands of dedicated skiers since 1936. All race revenue goes to off-setting the Snow Bowl budget.

== History ==
The original chute was built in 1936 by volunteers who also built a ski lodge and ski hill, one of the earliest in America. The chute was rebuilt in 1954 by local Coast Guardsmen and lasted until 1964 when it was brought to an end because of rot and neglect.

In 1990 it was resurrected once again out of pressure treated wood by another group of volunteers and material donors and became known as the Jack Williams Toboggan Chute. The week before the race many hours are spent during the night, when it is the coldest, to coat the wooden chute with layer upon the layer of ice. This is accomplished by a "Rube Goldberg" invention of David Dickeys, which pulleys a tub up the chute to slowly dispense water from holes in its back.

The chute is 400 feet (120 m) long, 70 feet (21 m) in elevation, and speeds up to 40 miles per hour (64 km/h) are attained. The run-out is on to frozen Hosmers' pond. If there is clear ice on the pond, some sleds will go the entire way across, 0.25 miles (0.40 km).

The Nationals used to be held the first weekend of February, but to avoid conflict with the Super Bowl the event has been changed to the second weekend in February, starting in 2008.

== Rules ==
The race toboggan must be of traditional shape, material and design to qualify for the Nationals. The race is like any race, in that the few rules are constantly pushed to the limits by tweaking the toboggan to make it go a tenth of a second faster. Even the "Inspector of Toboggans" from the 2007 race was found to have violated the slat rule to make his go a little faster.

Anyone can enter the U.S. National Toboggan Race national race and anybody can be the National Champion, no matter the age or ability. In 2007, two entrants from Tennessee, who had never seen snow before, won second place in the two-man division.
