= Center for Creative Imaging =

The Center for Creative Imaging (CCI) was a short-lived education and training center located in the renovated Knox Mill complex in Camden, Maine from about 1991 to 1994. It was an Eastman Kodak Company facility designed to teach digital imaging and related subject matter to artists, design professionals, photographers, and production staff.

The 27,000 square foot (2,500 m^{2}) facility sat on the Megunticook River, and contained what was then state-of-the-art equipment, including over 100 high-end Apple Macintosh IIfx computers, hard drives of up to 500 Mb of storage per machine, large displays, and an array of scanners, digital cameras, and output devices.

Classes ran from one to five days in length, generally three, and covered digital imaging areas like publishing, photography, and illustration. Several invitational and special events brought artists and experts like Paul Davis, Milton Glaser, Gary Panter, Graham Nash, Edward Tufte, and dozens of others to lecture and teach. Many of the leading photographers of the day using cutting-edge digital techniques taught there; other well-known artists came to take classes.

The Time "Man of the Year" cover for 1991 of Ted Turner was assembled by photographer Greg Heisler at the CCI with the assistance of staff. The creation of the cover took long enough to nearly delay the printing of the issue.

Kodak chose to sell the CCI in 1993 to a local businessman who, without the vast resources of a multinational company behind him, was unable to transform it into a profitable teaching facility, despite expanding its focus to include conventional photography in competition with the long-running Maine Photographic Workshops down the road in Rockport, Maine.

The CCI's building was purchased by MBNA, the credit card company. All of the fixtures, including polished granite and hardwoods, were removed, and the brickwork and exterior of the building were painted the drab gray and green corporate colors. MBNA left Camden before its merger with Bank of America in 2005.

The CCI is still remembered around Camden quite well, as many people from the area had jobs there as teaching assistants and other staff, and many locals took classes and changed their careers. Many dozens of expensive Steelcase chairs, even after more than a decade, could still be found throughout local businesses who bought them at the closing sale.
