= Megunticook Lake =

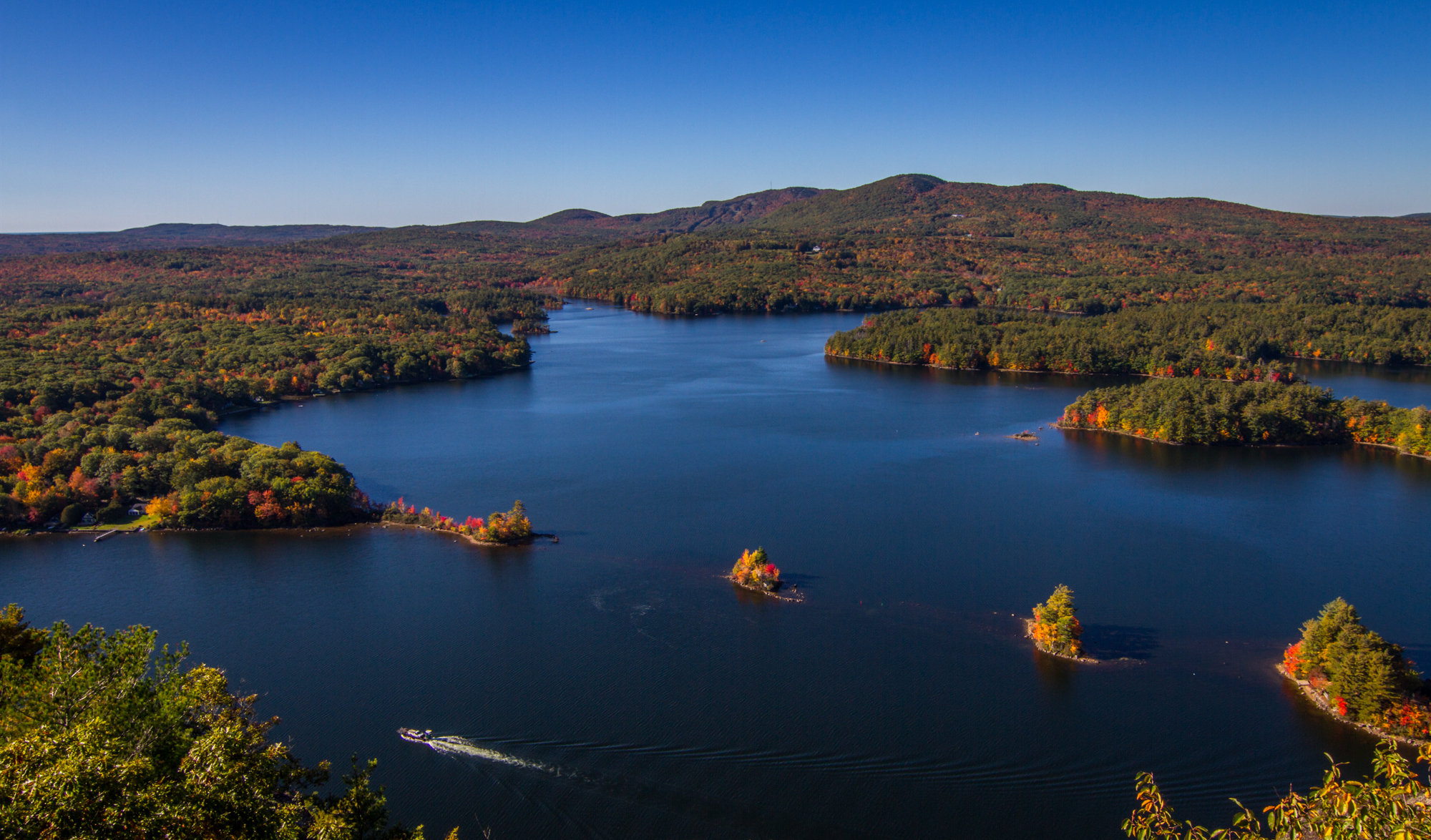
- View of the lake from Maiden Cliff

- Location within Maine Location within the United States
- Location: Knox County, Maine
- Coordinates: 44°15′25″N 69°06′32″W
- Type: lake
- Primary outflows: Megunticook River
- Basin countries: United States
- Surface area: 1,328 acres (537 ha)
- Average depth: 23 ft (7.0 m) (mean)
- Max. depth: 64 ft (20 m)
- Shore length^{1}: 30 mi (48 km)
- Surface elevation: 138 ft (42 m)
- ^{1} Shore length is not a well-defined measure.

Interactive map of Megunticook Lake

Megunticook Lake is a freshwater lake in Knox County, Maine, spanning portions of the towns of Camden, Hope, and Lincolnville. Covering 1,328 acres (537 ha), it is the largest lake by both area and volume in Knox County. The lake has a maximum depth of 64 feet (20 m) and a mean depth of 23 feet (7.0 m), with a perimeter of approximately 30 miles (48 km). The name "Megunticook" is derived from a Wabanaki word meaning "Great Swells of the Sea."

== Geography and geology ==
Megunticook Lake is located in the mid-coast region of Maine, with its eastern shore bordered by the dramatic cliffs of Mount Megunticook. The landscape of the Megunticook Watershed was carved by glaciers estimated to be up to a mile thick during the ice age some 25,000 years ago. The lake features a small peninsula that extends into the middle of the lake — where you can explore a nature preserve.

The lake drains into the Megunticook River, which flows through downtown Camden into Penobscot Bay. The watershed covers approximately 31 square miles and includes portions of the towns of Camden, Hope, Lincolnville, and Searsmont. The headwaters originate in Searsmont and flow through Moody Pond, Levenseller Pond, and Norton Pond before reaching Megunticook Lake.

== History ==
=== Colonial Era and lake formation ===
The current form of Megunticook Lake resulted from early colonial dam construction. In the early 1790's the need to store additional water for Molyneaux's sawmill and gristmill transformed the Pond into what we know today as Megunticook Lake, flooding hundreds of acres. Originally known as Canaan Pond, the lake was significantly enlarged through dam construction to provide water power for mills.

Camden's first mill was erected in 1771 by William Minot, not long after the first settlers arrived. The Megunticook River became the primary engine of economic development for the region, with the river powering numerous mills for nearly two centuries.

=== Industrial development ===
At one point, Megunticook had 11 dams and at least 15 separate mills. The mills produced a variety of goods including flour, textiles, anchors, and gunpowder. There was a period when Megunticook was known to change colors according to the particular dyes that the tanneries and woolen mills were using that day.

=== Modern era ===
In 1984-1985, the Megunticook Watershed Association purchased the two outlet dams (East and West Dams) and donated them along with a $20,000 endowment fund to the Town of Camden. These dams continue to maintain the current lake level for recreational use and as a public water supply.

== Recreation ==
=== Swimming and beaches ===
Barrett's Cove beach is located on the southeast corner of Megunticook Lake. Owned and maintained by the Town of Camden, this modest beach features public restrooms and showers. The beach provides designated swimming areas with shallow water for children and deeper areas for adults. The lake's maximum depth is 65 feet. Plus, a diving float is anchored several hundred feet from the shoreline!

=== Boating and paddling ===
The public can access the lake from improved boat ramps located off route 52 to the east and route 105 along the west shore. Breakwater Kayak Co. offers two-hour and four-hour tours in kayaks, starting from the Route 105 boat launch. Maine Sport Outfitters provides kayak, canoe, and stand-up paddleboard rentals and guided tours.

=== Fishing ===
Megunticook Lake supports both coldwater and warmwater fisheries. The clear water is full of cold-water and warm-water species and primarily has brown trout, largemouth bass, smallmouth bass, and white perch. Other species include brook trout, rainbow trout, chain pickerel, yellow perch, and rainbow smelt. Today, most of the fish present in Megunticook Lake and River are non native species that are stocked annually.

== Nature preserves ==
=== Fernald's Neck Preserve ===
On the peninsula in the center of Megunticook Lake, Fernald's Neck Preserve is 285 acres of land mostly covered by huge, mature hardwoods, hemlocks, and pines. The preserve, managed by the Nature Conservancy, features three hiking trails ranging from easy to moderately difficult. Balance Rock, a gigantic rock that is a glacial erratic, which means that it was carried a great distance to its location by glacial ice.

=== McPheters Preserve ===
Near the Route 105 boat launch, The McPheters Preserve is maintained and protected by the Coastal Mountains Trust. This 10-acre wooded preserve is dominated by eastern white pine and large hemlock trees. The preserve provides 2,000 feet of lake shoreline and serves as habitat for wildlife observation.

== Water quality and management ==
The lake also serves as a public water supply for nearby towns. The Megunticook Watershed Association, founded in 1969, monitors water quality and conducts environmental stewardship programs including invasive species monitoring, pollution prevention, and wildlife evaluations.

MWA has been testing water clarity in Megunticook Lake and Norton Pond since 1975 for the Maine Volunteer Lake Monitoring Program. Current reports indicate no known invasive aquatic plant infestations.

The Megunticook River remains on the State of Maine's list of impaired water bodies due to high bacteria levels and sediment accumulation behind aging dams. The Town of Camden, with input from the Megunticook River Citizens Advisory Committee, continues to explore options for improving river health and fish passage.

== Access ==
Public access to Megunticook Lake is available through:

- Barrett's Cove Beach (Route 52) - swimming beach with facilities
- Route 105 boat launch - public boat and kayak access
- Camden Hills State Park - hiking trails with lake views
- Fernald's Neck Preserve - hiking trails and nature study

The town is crossed by U. S. Route 1 and state routes 52 and 105.

== See also ==
- Camden Hills State Park
- Megunticook River
- Norton Pond
- Penobscot Bay
