= Northway Bank =

Community bank in New Hampshire, US

Northway Bank; Northway Financial, Inc.
- Company type: Public
- Traded as: OTCQB: NWYF
- Industry: Banking, Financial services
- Predecessor: Merger of The Berlin City Bank and Pemigewasset National Bank
- Founded: 2005(current), (1998 as Northway Financial), (1881 - Pemigewasset National Bank) & (1901 - The Berlin City Bank)
- Headquarters: Berlin, New Hampshire; 9 Main Street, U.S.
- Area served: New Hampshire
- Key people: William J. Woodward (Chairman, President & CEO) Jo-Ann Church (Sr VP, Credit Administration); Gary J. Laurash(Sr VP and CFO); Thomas D. Kaseta(Sr VP and CCO); Victor Levesque (Sr VP Commercial Banking); Paula F. Caughey (Sr VP Risk Management); Gregory F. Nolin (Sr VP Human Resources); Arthur Scott Thimann (Sr VP and CBO) Tyler White (Sr VP and STO)
- Products: Consumer banking, corporate banking, finance and insurance, investment banking, mortgage loans, wealth management, credit cards,
- Revenue: ▲US$ 7.28 million (2017)
- Total assets: ▼US$ 884 million (2017)
- Total equity: ▲US$ 81 million (2017)
- Number of employees: 197 (2017)
- Website: NorthwayBank.com

Northway Bank is a community bank located in New Hampshire. It was established in 1997 when the Berlin City Bank and the Pemigewasset National Bank merged, creating Northway Financial Today, it is New Hampshire's largest independent commercial bank and the top-ranking SBA lender in the state.

In January 2025, it was reported that Northway Financial, Inc. had merged its operations with Camden National Corporation, the parent company of Camden National Bank.

== Locations ==
Northway Bank has a total of 18 branches throughout the state, primarily in the northern portion of the state. Northway's main office is located in Berlin.

- Berlin - 9 Main Street, Berlin, NH 03570
- Campton - 414 Route 49, Campton, NH 03223
- Concord - 66 N Main Street, Concord, NH 03301
- Conway Village - 34 W. Main Street, Conway, NH 03818
- Gorham - 260 Main Street, Gorham, NH 03581
- Intervale - 3424 White Mountain Highway, North Conway, NH 03860
- Laconia - 400 S. Main Street, Laconia, NH 03246
- Manchester - 29 Cilley Road, Manchester, NH 03103
- Meredith - 42 Upper Ladd Hill Road, Meredith, NH 03253
- Settler's Crossing - 1500 White Mountain Highway, North Conway, NH 03860
- Pittsfield - 55 Main Street, Pittsfield, NH 03263
- Plymouth - 1-3 Highland Street, Plymouth, NH 03264
- Portsmouth - 750 Lafayette Road, Portsmouth, NH 03801
- Tilton - 5 Market Street, Tilton, NH 03276
- West Ossipee - Routes 16 & 25, West Ossipee, NH 03890
- West Plymouth - 287 Highland Street, West Plymouth, NH 03264

== Closed locations ==
- Ashland - 130 Main Street, Ashland, NH 03217
- Belmont - 9 Old State Road, Belmont, NH 03220
- Franklin - 354 Central Street, Franklin, NH 03235
- Groveton - 3 State Street, Groveton, NH 03582 (sold to Union Bank of Vermont)
- Littleton - 76 Main Street, Littleton, NH 03561 (sold to Union Bank of Vermont)
- North Woodstock - 155 Main Street, North Woodstock, NH 03262 (sold to Union Bank of Vermont)
- North Conway Location - 3278 White Mountain Highway, North Conway, NH 03860 (relocated)
