= Camden Snow Bowl =

Municipal ski area in Camden, Maine

- Location within Maine
- Location: Ragged Mountain
- Nearest city: Camden, Maine
- Coordinates: 44.217216°N 69.134667°W
- Vertical: 850 feet (260 m)
- Top elevation: 1,070 feet (330 m)
- Base elevation: 220 feet (67 m)
- Skiable area: 105 acres (42 ha)
- Trails: 15
- Longest run: 1 mile (1.6 km)
- Lift system: • 1 triple chair • 1 double chair • 1 carpet lift
- Terrain parks: 2
- Snowfall: 70 inches (1,800 mm)
- Snowmaking: 48 acres (19 ha)
- Night skiing: Yes
- Website: camdensnowbowl.com

The Camden Snow Bowl is a municipal ski area located on Ragged Mountain in Camden, Maine. Opened in 1936 during the Great Depression, it is one of the oldest continuously operating ski areas in New England and the only ski area on the East Coast with ocean views. The facility features 850 feet of lift-served vertical drop across 105 acres of skiable terrain, with 15 trails and two terrain parks.

Located about 4.5 miles (7.2 km) from Penobscot Bay, the Snow Bowl is notable for hosting the annual U.S. National Toboggan Championships on its 400-foot wooden toboggan chute, which terminates on frozen Hosmer Pond. The toboggan chute is the country's only remaining original, gravity-operated wooden chute of its kind. Beyond winter sports, the area serves as a year-round recreation facility offering hiking, mountain biking, and summer activities.

== History ==
=== Early development and Great Depression era ===
The Camden Snow Bowl opened in 1936, in the midst of the Great Depression, making it one of the oldest continuously operating ski areas in New England and one of only two operating Maine areas opened before World War II. The area was originally built by volunteers, with upwards of 150 volunteers working during the fall of 1936 to construct a lodge, skate house, and toboggan chute. All lumber had to be floated across Hosmer Pond as the area was surrounded by dense forest.

Since the town of Camden provided the land, it cleared the way for assistance from federal New Deal agencies. The Works Progress Administration (WPA) built the road to the lodge and furnished 75 men to groom the ski slopes and trails. The Civilian Conservation Corps, another New Deal agency, installed the first rope tow at the Snow Bowl in the late 1930s.

=== Winter Carnival era ===
The marquee attraction of the Snow Bowl's early years was the "Winter Carnival," a tradition that began in 1936. The Lions Club sponsored the first Winter Carnival, featuring activities such as toboggan rides, skating races, figure skating contests, horse races (skijoring), trap shooting, and wood sawing contests. The 1936 carnival drew an estimated 5,000 people, and by 1938, attendance had grown to approximately 10,000 visitors. The original lodge was 80 feet long with large granite fireplaces at each end.

The Winter Carnival was halted in 1940 due to World War II, though limited ski operations continued during the war years. The carnival briefly reemerged in the 1950s, with a 1957 event (the first after WWII) attracting more than 1,000 participants and spectators.

=== Expansion and modernization ===
After surviving multiple lean snow winters in the 1950s, plans were developed to keep pace with the skiing boom of the 1960s. New trails were cut around 1963, followed by a lift line in 1965. Leveraging federal funding in 1966, the expansion included a new lift, new lodge, additional trails, power transmission lines, and snowmaking equipment.

The original volunteer-built lodge was destroyed by fire in 1967, but was soon replaced by an A-frame lodge located closer to the ski trails and further from the pond. Throughout the 1960s and 1970s, the mountain underwent significant modernization with the addition of a T-Bar that reached nearly to the summit of Ragged Mountain in 1967, snowmaking capabilities in 1973, and a shorter T-Bar and chairlift in 1976.

=== Year-round operations development ===
By the 2020s, the Snow Bowl began expanding beyond winter skiing operations to address seasonal revenue challenges and facility underutilization during warmer months. The facility hosts a concert series during summer weekends in August and has explored diversification into mountain biking, which has gained popularity in the region. Staff and consultants developed a multi-season recreation master plan to create year-round destination activities for tourists and local residents.

The master plan includes proposals for an expanded lodge facility with retail space for sporting equipment sales and rentals, improved trail systems to accommodate different skill levels for mountain biking and hiking, and potential adventure recreation features. These developments follow examples of other Maine ski areas and New England facilities that have successfully invested in mountain biking to attract summer visitors.

== Ski area ==
=== Ragged Mountain development project ===
Ragged Mountain proposed plans to redevelop the area starting in the mid 2000s. In 2010, the double chairlift was taken down and placed in storage. Once fundraising efforts were achieved in 2014, construction started. Every lift was taken down, but a new magic carpet and triple chairlift along with LED lights, allowing for night skiing, were in place by the beginning of 2015. The double chairlift was replaced in time for the following season.

=== Lifts and trails ===
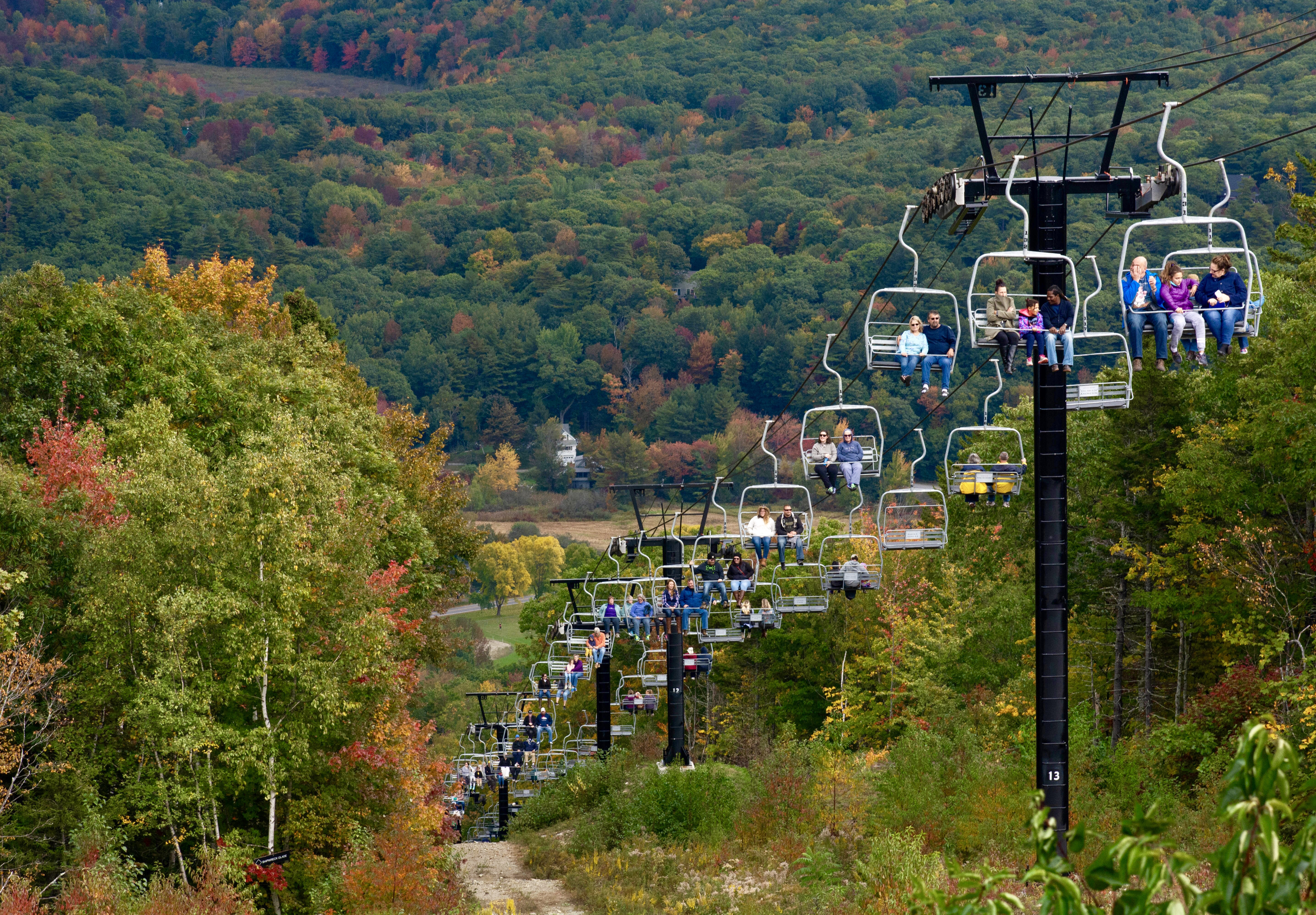
Fall Foliage Chairlift Ride

The Snow Bowl is the only ski area in the contiguous United States to have clear view of the ocean, which can be seen from the summit of the triple chairlift. When the resort is not open for skiing, visitors can still ride the chairlift to the summit. The mountain is also open for hiking and mountain biking.

Despite its small size, under 1,000 feet (300 m) of vertical, the Camden Snow Bowl features 3 lifts—one magic carpet, one double chairlift, and one triple chairlift. These lifts service 20 runs, from beginner green runs to advanced black diamond runs, spanning 100 acres (40 ha) of skiable area.

Name	Type	Builder	Year built	Vertical	Length	Ride Time	Notes
Triple	Triple	Riblet	2014	826	3877	8.6	Relocated from Pleasant Mountain. Open for scenic lift rides in the summer.
Double	Double	Hall	2015	228	1123	2.8	

== Winterfest ==
Previously known as Winter Carnival, Winterfest consists of winter recreational activities and contests. In 1936, when Winter Carnival started, festivities included toboggan rides, skating races, figure skating contests, horse races (skijoring), trap shooting, and wood sawing contests. Due to World War II, these events halted in 1940.

In 2002, the modern Winterfest was developed. While toboggan rides still occur, the weekend introduced ice carving, the polar plunge, the Maine State Snow Sculpture Championships, live music, the CamJam ski and snowboard exhibition and the annual U.S. National Toboggan Championships.

== Toboggan chute ==
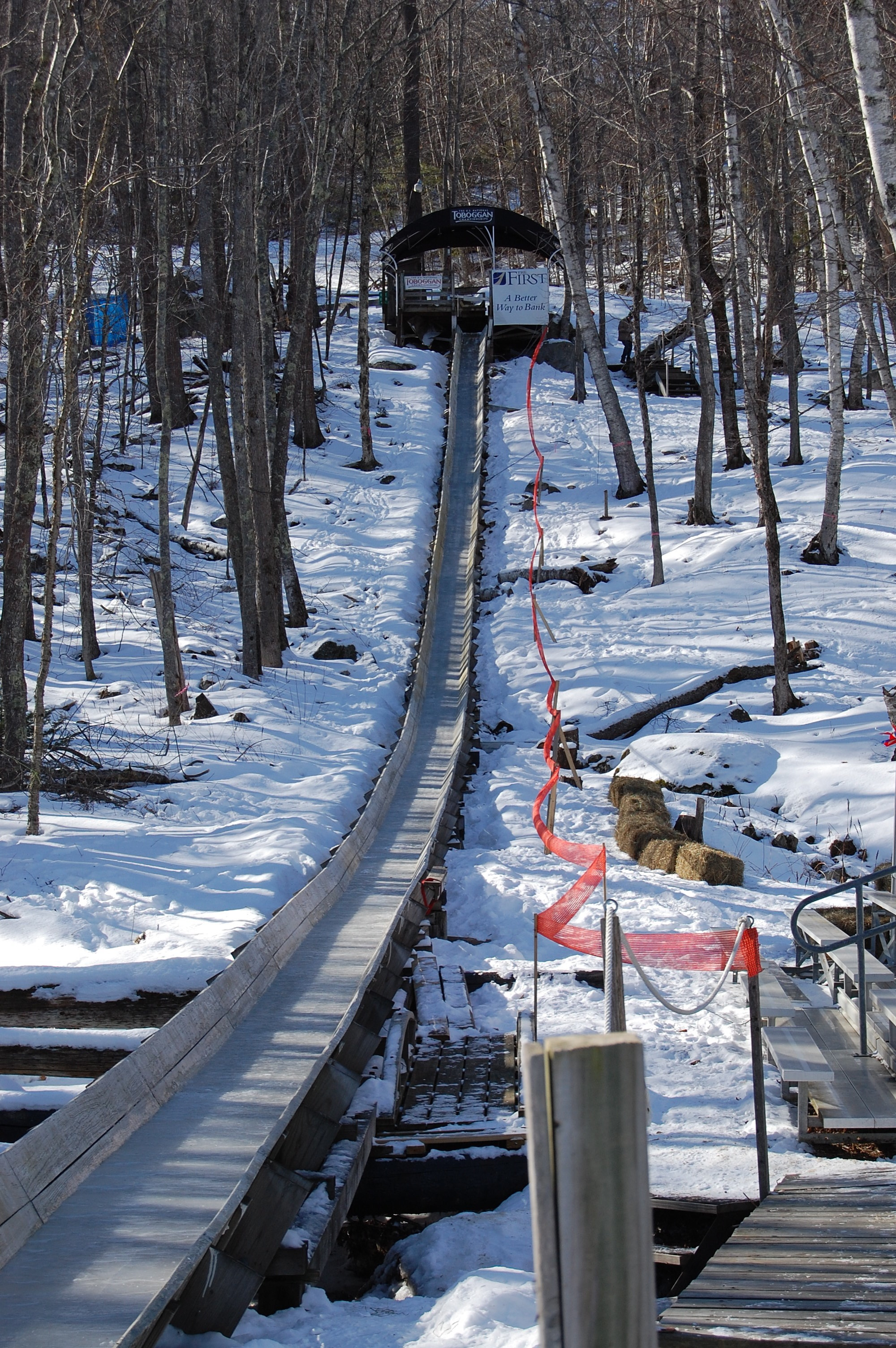
Top section of the toboggan chute

The Jack Williams Toboggan Chute is 400 feet (120 m) long and rises 70 feet (21 m) in elevation. Jack Williams was a Camden local who spearheaded the renovation and documented the history of the snow bowl. Tobogganing started in Camden in 1936 during the first Winter Carnival. The chute was made of wood and covered in ice, allowing participants to slide down in their sleds. Despite being rebuilt in the early 1990s to match safety standards, the base remains made of wood.

Volunteers partake in a slow process of building up layers of ice on the wood chute every night before a race. This is done through a "Rube Goldberg" invention in which bags of water with small holes are pulled up by hand. The cool temperatures before dawn freeze the water, creating the slide. Similar to the luge, sleds fly down this icy chute at hurtling speeds, as fast as 40 miles per hour (64 km/h). In Camden, participants are sent out onto Hosmer Pond, which is frozen, and sometimes are able to travel all the way across the water.

Every year, the Toboggan Championships are held across from the Camden Snow Bowl. Originally, it was held on the first weekend of February, but the date has since been changed to the second weekend of February in order to avoid conflict with the NFL Super Bowl. The event has been taking place every year since 1991 and allows anyone to register, making the event more of a winter festivity than a competitive sport like in the Olympics. This is the only organized wood toboggan event in the country.
