= Harold Allen Fernald =

American publishing executive and philanthropist (1932–2025)

H. Allen Fernald
- Born: June 1, 1932; Haverhill, Massachusetts, U.S.
- Died: June 2, 2025 (aged 93); Camden, Maine, U.S.
- Education: University of Maine, B.A.; New York University, M.B.A.; University of Maine, Ph.D.; University of Maine, D.Litt.
- Spouse: Sally Camilla Carroll (m. 1956)
- Children: 3

H. Allen Fernald (June 1, 1932 – June 2, 2025) was an American multi-millionaire publishing executive and philanthropist. He was the owner and chairman of Down East Enterprise in Rockport, Maine, which publishes Down East and Shooting Sportsman magazines. He was the Chief Executive Officer of Holt, Rinehart & Winston from 1995—1999.

== Education ==
- Bachelor of Arts, University of Maine, 1954, Alpha Tau Omega
- Master of Business Administration, New York University, 1964
- Doctor of Philosophy, University of Maine, 2002
- Doctor of Letters, University of Maine, 2002

== Career ==
Fernald began his career in Manhattan in the 1960s, "[rising quickly] through the ranks of Holt, Rinehart & Winston and later CBS, ultimately becoming their senior vice president and head of the college publishing division." From 1970-1977, Fernald was the vice president of Columbia Broadcasting Systems. From 1981-1985, he was the president of Hanson Energy Products, Inc.

In 1977, he and Sally Fernald purchased Down East magazine, then based in Camden, and moved to the area. At the time, Down East published 10 issues a year and had color on only four pages per issue. The Fernalds increased the number of issues to 12 per year and introduced color throughout. They also added two magazine titles, Shooting Sportsman and Fly Rod & Reel, and a books division, Down East Books. Allen was the company's publisher until his retirement in 2001. Down East Books was sold to Rowman & Littlefield in 2013. Fly Rod & Reel ceased publication in 2017.

From 1978 to 2003, Fernald was a board member of United Publications, Inc. Since 2003, Fernald has served on the board of directors for John Wiley & Sons, Inc. He currently serves as Secretary of the Ocean Energy Institute of the University of Maine. Fernald was an early investor in subaquatic tidal power plants and windmill technologies in the United States of America.

== Philanthropy ==
In January 2005, Fernald and his wife, Sally Carroll Fernald, gifted 86-acres of pristine forest on the summit of Bald Mountain to the Coastal Mountains Land Trust. In 2007, H. Allen Fernald personally donated $1,000,000.00 to the University of Maine to support the arts.

== Personal life and death ==
Fernald was born in Haverhill, Massachusetts, to Harold Allen and Leona Swan (Horton) Fernald). He married Sally Camilla Carroll on June 23, 1956. Fernald had three children and six grandchildren. He was a resident of the Camden, Maine area from 1977.

Fernald died in Camden, Maine on June 2, 2025, one day after his 93rd birthday.
