= USS Craven (DD-70) =

Caldwell-class destroyer

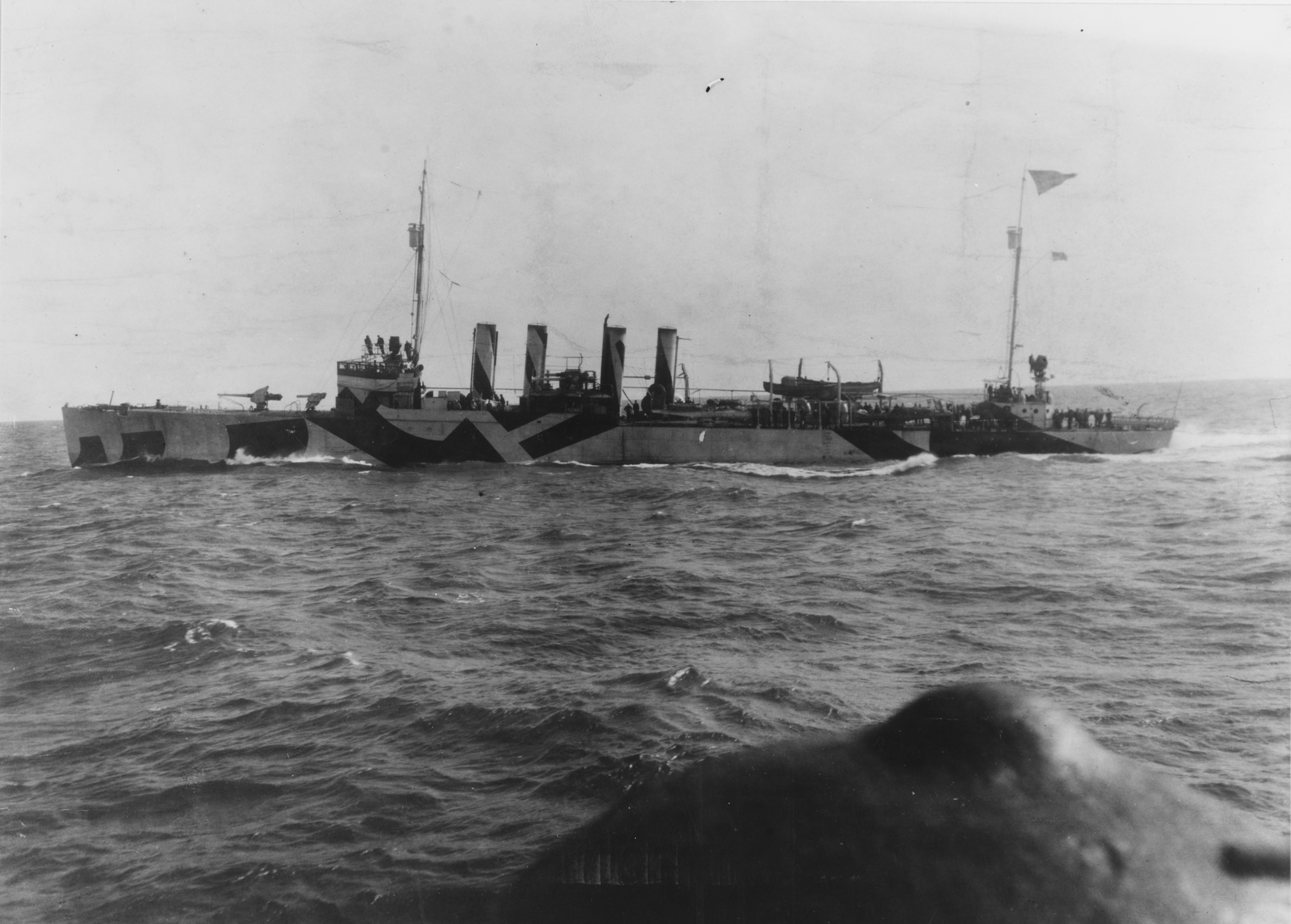
- USS Craven (DD-70) underway in November 1918

History

United States
- Name: Craven
- Namesake: Commander Tunis Craven
- Builder: Norfolk Naval Shipyard
- Laid down: 20 November 1917
- Launched: 29 June 1918
- Commissioned: 19 October 1918
- Decommissioned: 15 June 1922
- Renamed: Conway, 12 November 1939
- Namesake: Quartermaster William Conway
- Recommissioned: 9 August 1940
- Decommissioned: 23 October 1940
- Fate: Transferred to Royal Navy 23 October 1940

United Kingdom
- Name: Lewes
- Acquired: 23 October 1940
- Commissioned: 23 October 1940
- Decommissioned: 1945
- Fate: Scuttled 25 May 1946

General characteristics
- Class & type: Caldwell-class destroyer
- Displacement: 1,020 tons (standard), 1,125 tons (normal)
- Length: 308 ft (94 m) waterline; 315 ft 6 in (96.16 m) overall
- Beam: 31 ft 3 in (9.53 m)
- Draft: 8 ft (2.4 m); 11 ft 6 in (3.51 m) max
- Installed power: 20,000 shp (15,000 kW)
- Propulsion: Thornycroft boilers, Parsons geared turbines, two shafts
- Speed: 35 knots (65 km/h; 40 mph)
- Complement: 146
- Armament: 4 x 4 in (102 mm)/50 cal. guns; 1 x 1.1 in (28 mm) AA; later 1 x 3 in (76 mm) gun; 2 x triple 21 inch (533 mm) torpedo tubes

USS Craven (DD-70), later renamed USS Conway (DD-70), a Caldwell-class destroyer, was in commission in the United States Navy from 1918 to 1922 and briefly in 1940, and later in the Royal Navy as HMS Lewes from 1940 to 1945.

== Construction ==
The second US Navy ship named for Commander Tunis Craven (1813–1864), Craven was laid down at Norfolk Navy Yard in Portsmouth, Virginia, on 20 November 1917 and was launched on 29 June 1918, sponsored by Mrs. F. Learned, daughter of Commander Craven. Craven commissioned on 19 October 1918.

== Technical characteristics ==
Craven was 315 feet 6 inches (96.16 m) long overall and 310 feet (94.49 m) at the waterline, with a beam of 30 feet 7 inches (9.32 m) and a draft of 8 feet 10 inches (2.69 m). Displacement was 1,120 long tons (1,140 t) normal and 1,187 long tons (1,206 t) full load. Four Thornycroft boilers fed Parsons geared steam turbines rated at 20,000 shaft horsepower (15,000 kW) and drove two propeller shafts, giving a design speed of 30 knots (56 km/h; 35 mph). Four funnels were fitted. Craven reached a speed of 32.33 knots (59.88 km/h; 37.20 mph) during sea trials.

Main gun armament consisted of four 4 in (102 mm) /50 caliber guns, with one forward and one aft on the ship's centerline, and the remaining two on the ships beam. Anti-aircraft armament consisted of two 3"/23 caliber guns, while torpedo armament consisted of twelve 21-inch (533 mm) torpedo tubes, arranged in four triple mounts on the ship's beams.

After her transfer to the Royal Navy in 1940, the ship was re-armed, with two single 2-pounder autocannon replacing the forward 4-inch gun, while the remaining three 4-inch guns were replaced by single American 3"/50 caliber guns, on the ship's beams and aft, while two 20 mm cannon were fitted. All torpedo tubes were removed, while a relatively small depth charge outfit of twenty charges was fitted, in accordance with the ship's employment on convoy duties along the east coast of Great Britain, where the principal danger was enemy aircraft. A QF 12-pounder 12 cwt naval gun was later fitted forward, with the two 2-pounder guns moved to the ship's beam, replacing the beam 3-inch guns.

== Service history ==
=== United States Navy ===
Craven cruised along the United States East Coast and in the Caribbean in training, maneuvers, and torpedo practice, until 3 May 1919 when she sailed from New York for Trepassey Bay, Newfoundland. Here she served on a weather station and observed the flight of Navy seaplanes in the historic first aerial crossing of the Atlantic. After overhaul, Craven participated in Army gun tests at Fort Story, Virginia, and had recruiting duty at Hampton Roads, Virginia; Fall River, Massachusetts, and Newport, Rhode Island, until placed in reserve at Philadelphia, Pennsylvania 10 October 1919.

Still in reduced commission, Craven arrived at Charleston, South Carolina, 10 February 1921. She transported liberty parties between Charleston and Jacksonville, Florida, and took part in the fleet maneuvers off Virginia and in Narragansett Bay. Arriving at Philadelphia 29 March 1922, Craven was placed out of commission 15 June 1922.

On 12 November 1939, Craven was renamed USS Conway — for William Conway (1802–1865), the first U.S. Navy ship of the name — to free the name Craven for the new destroyer USS Craven (DD-382), Recommissioned on 9 August 1940, Conway arrived at Halifax, Nova Scotia, Canada, on 17 October 1940, where she was decommissioned on 23 October 1940.

=== Royal Navy ===
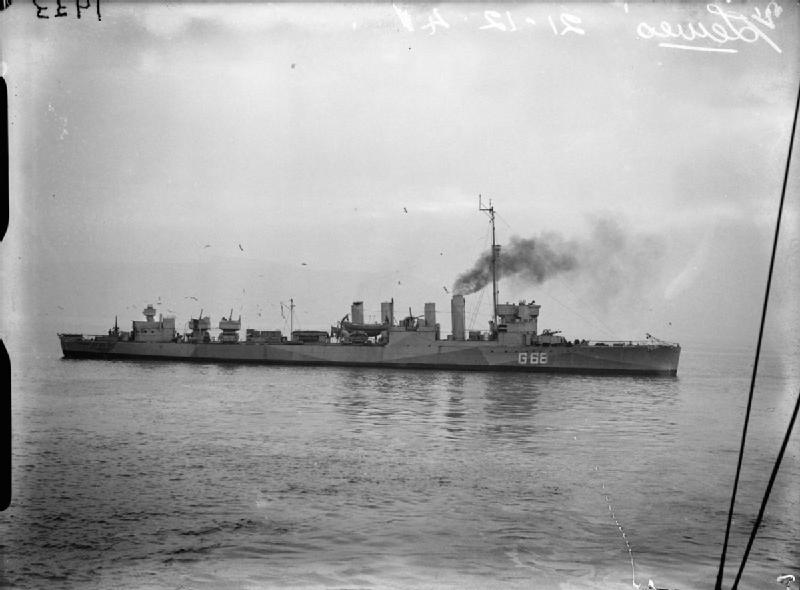
HMS Lewes

Turned over to British authorities as part of the Destroyers for Bases Agreement, the destroyer commissioned in the Royal Navy as HMS Lewes (after Lewes in East Sussex, England), with the pennant number G 68, on 23 October 1940, the day of her transfer.

Lewes departed Halifax 1 November 1940 and arrived at Belfast, Northern Ireland, on 9 November 1940, searching for the German cruiser Admiral Scheer during her passage. She was refitted at Plymouth, England, and ordered to remain there under the command of Commander-in-Chief, Plymouth. Severely damaged in enemy air raids on 21 and 22 April 1941, she remained out of action until December 1941, when she joined the Home Fleet. In February 1942, she joined the Rosyth Escort Force, escorting convoys between the Thames and the Firth of Forth, Scotland. On 9 and 10 November 1942, she engaged German E-boats which attacked her convoy off Lowestoft. Lewes escorted a troop convoy on its way to the Middle East and arrived at Simonstown, South Africa, 18 May 1943. As well as serving as a target ship for aircraft during their training, she searched for enemy submarines reported rounding the Cape of Good Hope.

In 1944, Lewes joined the Eastern Fleet as a submarine tender and torpedo target ship. She departed Durban, South Africa, on 13 August 1944 and arrived at Ceylon a month later. She was based at Trincomalee, Ceylon, until January 1945, when she was transferred to the British Pacific Fleet as a target ship for aircraft training. Arriving at Fremantle, Australia, on 11 February 1945, she shifted to Sydney, Australia, on 20 February 1945 and remained there until the end of hostilities with Japan, which brought World War II to a close on 15 August 1945.

On 12 October 1945, Lewes was declared no longer necessary to the fleet and ordered scrapped. She was stripped of valuable scrap and was scuttled in the Tasman Sea off Sydney on 25 May 1946.
