= William Conway (United States Navy) =

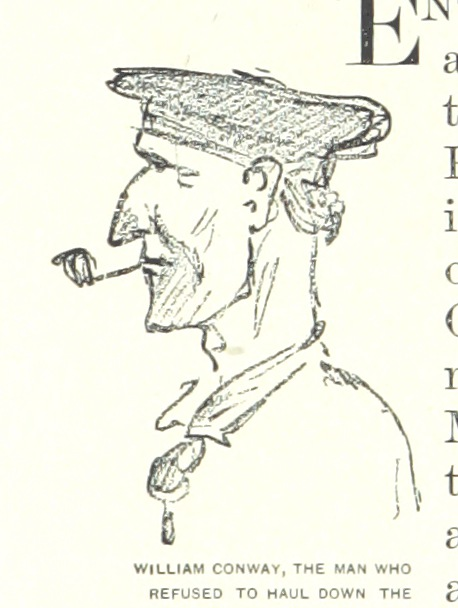
A sketch of Conway by William Waud

William Conway (c. 1802 – November 30, 1865) was a United States Navy sailor, born in Camden, Maine. He served in the Navy for forty (40) years.

In January 1861, he was serving as the quartermaster for Pensacola Navy Yard (also known as Warrington Navy Yard). On January 12, 1861, two men claiming to be commissioners of the state of Florida, along with a "large force of armed men", ordered the surrender of the Navy yard and its munitions. In spite of having a company of Marines and two ships-of-war under his command, the fort's captain surrendered. (Note: The captain was court martialed and given a "five-year suspension from command and a public reprimand.") The fort's men were taken as prisoners. Confederate sympathizer Lieutenant Frederick B. Kinshaw ordered Conway to lower the American flag. Conway replied: "I have served under that flag for forty years, and I won't do it." For his refusal, Conway was arrested and clapped in irons. Shortly afterward, he was sent north, where he remained until his death at Brooklyn, New York. For his patriotic action, Conway was presented with a gold medal by citizens of California and a letter of commendation from the Secretary of the Navy.

Conway died on May 30, 1865, in Brooklyn, New York and was buried in the Brooklyn Navy Yard.

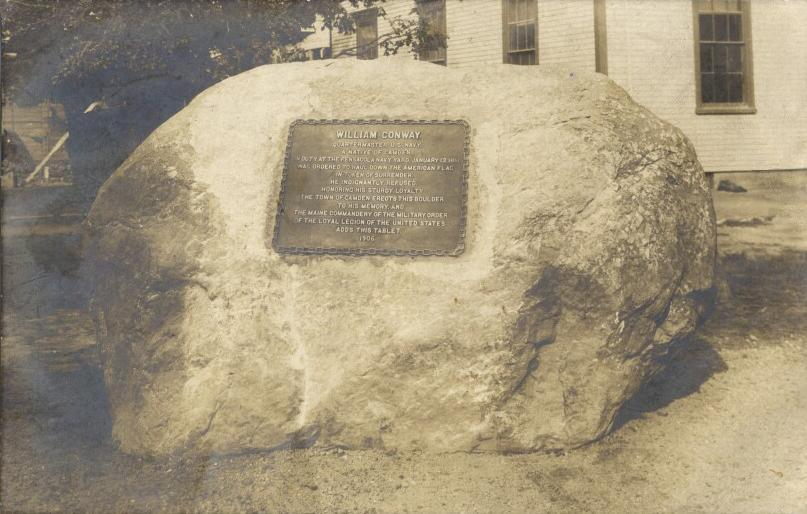
Conway Monument in c. 1910

In August 1906, the Quartermaster William Conway Monument was unveiled at Camden, a granite boulder affixed with a commemorative bronze plaque "honoring his sturdy loyalty."

== Namesakes ==
Two destroyers have been named USS Conway in his honor:

- USS Conway (DD-70), a Caldwell-class destroyer
- USS Conway (DD-507), a World War II Fletcher-class destroyer

== Sources ==
- "Conway II (DD-507)". Dictionary of American Naval Fighting Ships (DANFS). Naval History and Heritage Command, United States Navy.
- The Maine Writers Research Club (1919). Maine My State. Lewiston, Maine: The Journal Print Shop.
- Miller, J. Michael (Fall 1991). "Marine's Telling of 1861 Florida Navy Yard Fall Given" (PDF). Fortitudine. XX (4). History & Museum Division, United States Marine Corps: 8–9.
- Wilson, James Grant; Fiske, John, eds. (1888). Appletons' Cyclopædia of American Biography - Volume 1. New York: D. Appleton & Company. p. 712.
