= Curtis Island (Maine) =

Island in Camden Harbour, Camden, Maine

Coordinates: 44°12′07″N 69°02′59″W

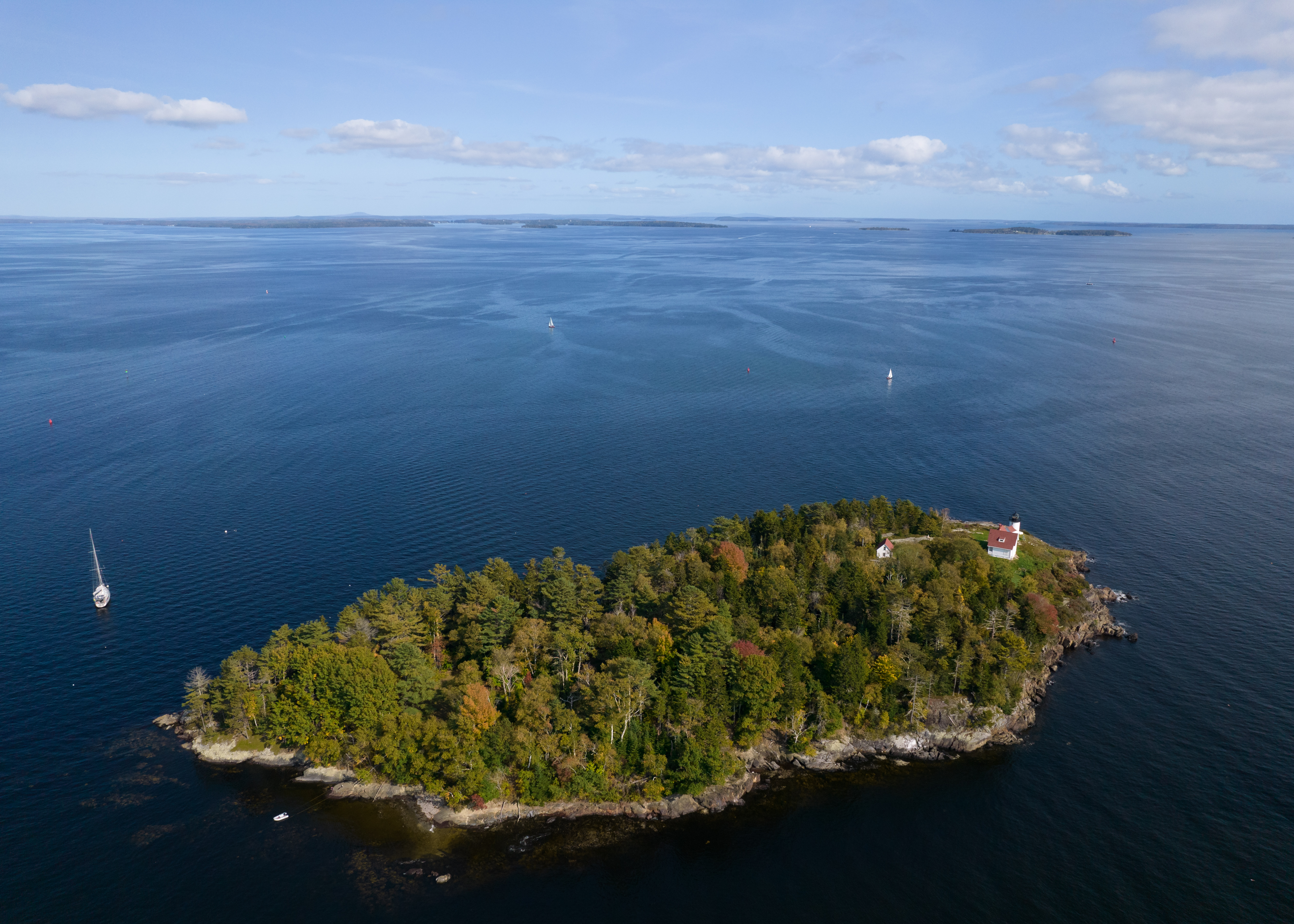
Aerial view of Curtis Island from the west

Curtis Island is an island located in the exterior of Camden Harbor, in Camden, Maine, United States. Curtis Island was initially known as Mark Island to early explorers. Then, around 1768, the island became known as Negro Island, named after a black sailor who later lived there and among the Penobscot tribal nation. The island updated its name in 1934 after Cyrus H. K. Curtis, publisher of the Saturday Evening Post, a long time resident and benefactor of Camden.

There is a lighthouse and caretaker's house on the southwestern point of the island. There are two paths around either side of the island and one open grassy path down the middle. The island light is depicted in the Fitz Henry Lane painting Lighthouse at Camden, Maine.

== See also ==
- List of islands of Maine
