= Camden, Maine =

Town in Maine, United States

- Town
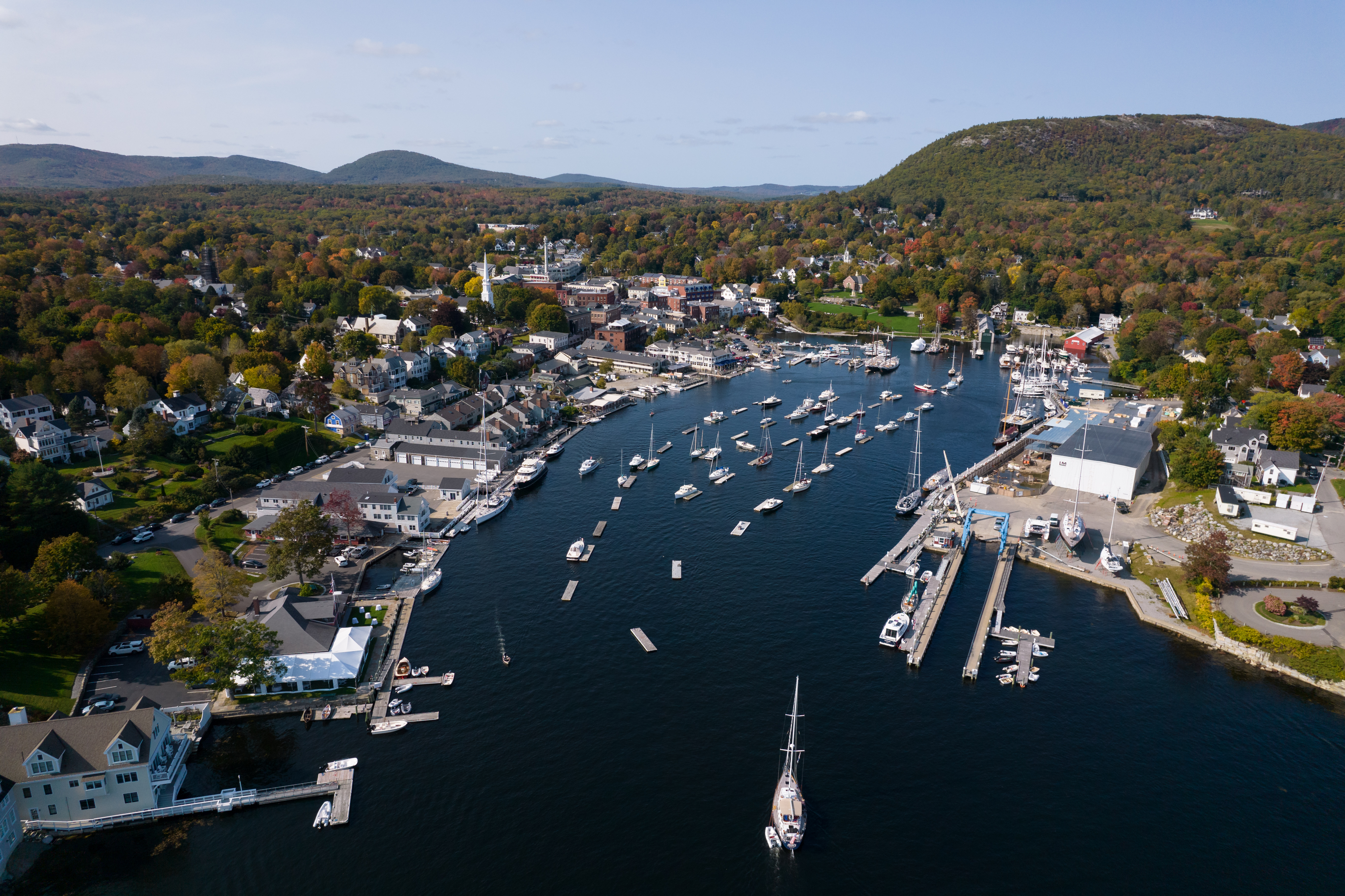
- Aerial view of Camden from the harbor

- Seal

- Location in Knox County and the state of Maine.
- Coordinates: 44°14′35″N 69°06′36″W
- Country: United States
- State: Maine
- County: Knox
- Incorporated: 1791
- Villages: Camden; Melvin Heights

Government
  - Type: Town Meeting-Council–manager

Area
  - Total: 26.65 sq mi (69.02 km^{2})
  - Land: 18.24 sq mi (47.24 km^{2})
  - Water: 8.41 sq mi (21.78 km^{2})
- Elevation: 269 ft (82 m)

Population (2020)
  - Total: 5,232
  - Density: 287/sq mi (110.8/km^{2})
- Time zone: UTC−5 (Eastern (EST))
  - Summer (DST): UTC−4 (EDT)
- ZIP Code: 04843
- Area code: 207
- FIPS code: 23-09725
- GNIS feature ID: 582384
- Website: www.camdenmaine.gov

Camden is a town in Knox County, Maine, United States. The population was 5,232 at the 2020 census. Located on Penobscot Bay at the mouth of the Megunticook River, Camden is one of the few places on the Atlantic seaboard where mountains meet the sea.

The town was incorporated in 1791 and named after Charles Pratt, 1st Earl Camden, a supporter of American colonial rights. Camden developed as an industrial center in the 19th century, with mills along the Megunticook River supporting shipbuilding, textile manufacturing, and lime production. The local shipyards launched notable vessels including the first six-masted schooner ever built.

Beginning in the 1880s, Camden transformed into a prominent summer colony, attracting wealthy seasonal residents from northeastern cities who built elaborate mansions along the waterfront. The town has maintained cultural significance as the one-time residence of Pulitzer Prize-winning poet Edna St. Vincent Millay and home to institutions including the Camden International Film Festival. Camden's scenic harbor and historic architecture have made it a popular location for filmmakers across two centuries.

== History ==
=== Pre-Settlement ===
The coastal region of Camden, situated on Penobscot Bay, offered rich resources and excellent geography for a future maritime community. While various regional Native groups historically utilized the coastal and forest resources, the beginning of its organized history and development started with the arrival of the first European pioneers.

=== Early settlement ===
Although the area was included in the Waldo Patent, European colonization did not begin until after the French and Indian War, around 1771–1772. James Richards led the first settlement effort, building a home at the mouth of the Megunticook River. Other settlers followed, establishing farms on the challenging mountainous terrain. The Conway House, a Cape Cod style home built in 1770, represents one of the earliest surviving structures from this period. The building was converted into a history museum in 1962.

=== Revolutionary War period ===
During the American Revolutionary War, Camden served as a strategic location. When Castine fell to the British in 1779 following the failed Penobscot expedition, Camden became a rendezvous point and encampment for American forces under Major George Ulmer. British forces conducted raids in the area, burning a local sawmill.

=== Incorporation and early 19th century ===
On February 17, 1791, the Massachusetts General Court incorporated Megunticook Plantation as the town of Camden, named after Charles Pratt, 1st Earl Camden, a British Parliament member and advocate for civil liberties. During the War of 1812, local forces constructed a defensive battery atop Mount Battie, equipped with 12- and 18-pounder cannons. Despite lacking qualified gunners, the fortification's presence deterred British naval attacks.

=== Industrial development ===
Following the War of 1812, Camden experienced rapid industrial growth. The Megunticook River provided abundant water power for various mills, including sawmills and gristmills. By 1858, the town supported diverse manufacturing including carriage factories, sash and blind factories, and blacksmith shops. Six active shipyards launched ten to twelve vessels annually.

The town's industrial base expanded significantly by 1886 to include foundry products, railroad cars, woolens, paper mill feltings, anchors, maritime hardware, planking, powder kegs, excelsior, mattresses, tinware, oakum, textiles, boots, shoes, leather goods, flour, meal, corn brooms, and barrels. Camden became the second-largest producer of lime in the region after Rockland, with limestone quarried locally and processed in kilns before shipment to ports throughout the United States. This lime industry continued until 1891, when Rockport separated as an independent town.

The town's shipbuilding industry reached its peak in the late 19th century. The H.M. Bean Yard launched notable vessels including the Charlotte A. Maxwell, the largest four-masted schooner of its time, and the George W. Wells, the first six-masted schooner ever constructed.

=== Summer colony era ===
Beginning in the 1880s, wealthy "rusticators" and sportsmen discovered Camden's natural beauty as a summer destination. Literary works by Sarah Orne Jewett and paintings by Fitz Hugh Lane, Frederick Church, and Childe Hassam romanticized Maine's coastal scenery, attracting visitors to local accommodations including the Bayview House Hotel, Ocean House, and Mrs. Hosmer's Boarding House.

Edwin Dillingham constructed the first purpose-built summer cottages in 1880 on Dillingham Point, establishing Camden as a fashionable summer colony. Wealthy families from Philadelphia, Boston, New York City, Washington, D.C., and Chicago built elaborate Shingle Style "cottages" along High Street, Bay View Street, and Beauchamp Point, rivaling similar developments in Bar Harbor. Summer residents typically arrived via Boston steamship lines or the Maine Central Railroad through Rockland. This seasonal influx transformed the local economy, as former mariners found employment as caretakers, gardeners, cooks, and carpenters serving the summer community.

=== The Great Fire and reconstruction ===
In November 1892, a devastating fire driven by strong easterly winds destroyed Camden's business district. The community responded immediately, with local businessmen investing in the construction of twelve large brick buildings, including the Camden Opera House and the controversial Masonic Temple (later the Lord Camden Inn). Rather than deterring development, the Great Fire preceded a period of increased summer colony growth.

Infrastructure improvements followed, including a road to the summit of Mount Battie in 1897 with an accompanying inn. In 1898, Philadelphia summer residents established the Megunticook Golf Club on Beauchamp Point. The Whitehall Inn opened in 1901 in a converted sea captain's mansion on High Street, catering to affluent visitors.

Prominent summer families including Curtis, Bok, Keep, Gribbel, Dillingham, and Borland contributed significantly to Camden's civic infrastructure through donations that funded the public library, an amphitheater designed by Fletcher Steele, Camden Harbor Park designed by the Olmsted Brothers, the Village Green, and renovations to the Camden Opera House.

=== 20th century development ===
==== World War II and Eleanor Roosevelt's visit ====
During World War II, Camden contributed to the war effort through shipbuilding. The Camden Shipping & Marine Railway Company was formed to build wooden barges for the military. On February 9, 1943, First Lady Eleanor Roosevelt visited Camden to christen the launch of the 194-foot barge Pine Tree, one of four barges built at the Camden shipyard. The launch was a major event, drawing large crowds, press, and film crews. Mrs. Roosevelt broke the traditional champagne bottle across the bow and was splashed with champagne in the process. During her visit, she was presented with traditional Native American gifts by members of the Penobscot tribe, including a beaded headband and receiving the name "Ow-Du-Sees-Ul" (Princess of Many Trails).

==== Maritime recreation ====
Philadelphia publishing magnate Cyrus Curtis established the Camden Yacht Club in 1912, responding to the growing number of private yachts in Camden Harbor. The club celebrated its centennial in 2006 with the publication of "From Steam to Sail: 100 Years of the Camden Yacht Club." Captain Frank Swift initiated Camden's cruise schooner industry in 1936, establishing the windjammer fleet that continues operating today.

==== Arts and literature ====
Camden's cultural reputation was enhanced in 1912 when Edna St. Vincent Millay first recited her poem "Renascence," written from atop Mount Battie, to guests at the Whitehall Inn. A patron's offer to fund her education at Vassar College launched her career as a Pulitzer Prize-winning poet and prominent figure of the Roaring Twenties.

French harpist, composer, and conductor Carlos Salzedo founded the internationally recognized Salzedo Summer Harp Colony in Camden, hosting annual Harp Festivals in the library amphitheater. The town became home to Bay Chamber Concerts and regular theater productions at the Opera House and Shakespeare performances in the amphitheater.

During the 1950s, Camden attracted notable artists and writers, leading to the establishment of Maine Coast Artists in nearby Rockport. Wayne Doolittle launched Down East Magazine in 1954, further promoting Maine's cultural image.

==== Onscreen ====
- Victor Fleming's Academy Award-nominated Captains Courageous (1937), Henry King’s Carousel (1957) and Mark Robson’s Academy Award-nominated Peyton Place (1957) all had scenes shot in Camden.
- Todd Field's Academy Award-nominated In the Bedroom (2001) had settings that included the historic Camden/Rockport welcome arch, the bar where Tom Wilkinson's character goes looking for his son's friend, the Camden Harbor Park and Amphitheatre where Sissy Spacek's character directs the Balkan Girl's Chorus in an outdoor concert, the exterior of the bar where her son's killer is working, and the shots of the town at dawn from the summit of Mount Battie for the film's finale.
- Other productions include Brad Silberling's Casper (1995), and Stephen King's Thinner (1996)
- The soap opera Passions used Camden locations to represent the fictional town of Harmony.

==== Modern cultural institutions ====
Contemporary Camden supports various cultural activities including the Camden Shakespeare Company's summer festival in the library amphitheater and the annual U.S. National Toboggan Championships at Camden Snow Bowl each February. The town served as the location for the 2001 HGTV Dream Home.

The Points North Institute, established in Camden and Rockport, founded the Camden International Film Festival in 2005, focusing on documentary filmmaking. The festival expanded to include the Points North Forum (2009), the Camden/TFI Retreat in partnership with Tribeca Film Institute (2015), and various professional development programs.

==== Christmas by the Sea ====
Since 1986, Camden has celebrated the multiple day Christmas by the Sea festival with Christmas tree lightings, parades, caroling, holiday markets, craft fairs, and performances. Santa arrives each year by boat at the Camden Public Landing. The festival is hosted by the Camden Area Business Group. Activities also take place in Rockport and Lincolnville.

== Geography ==
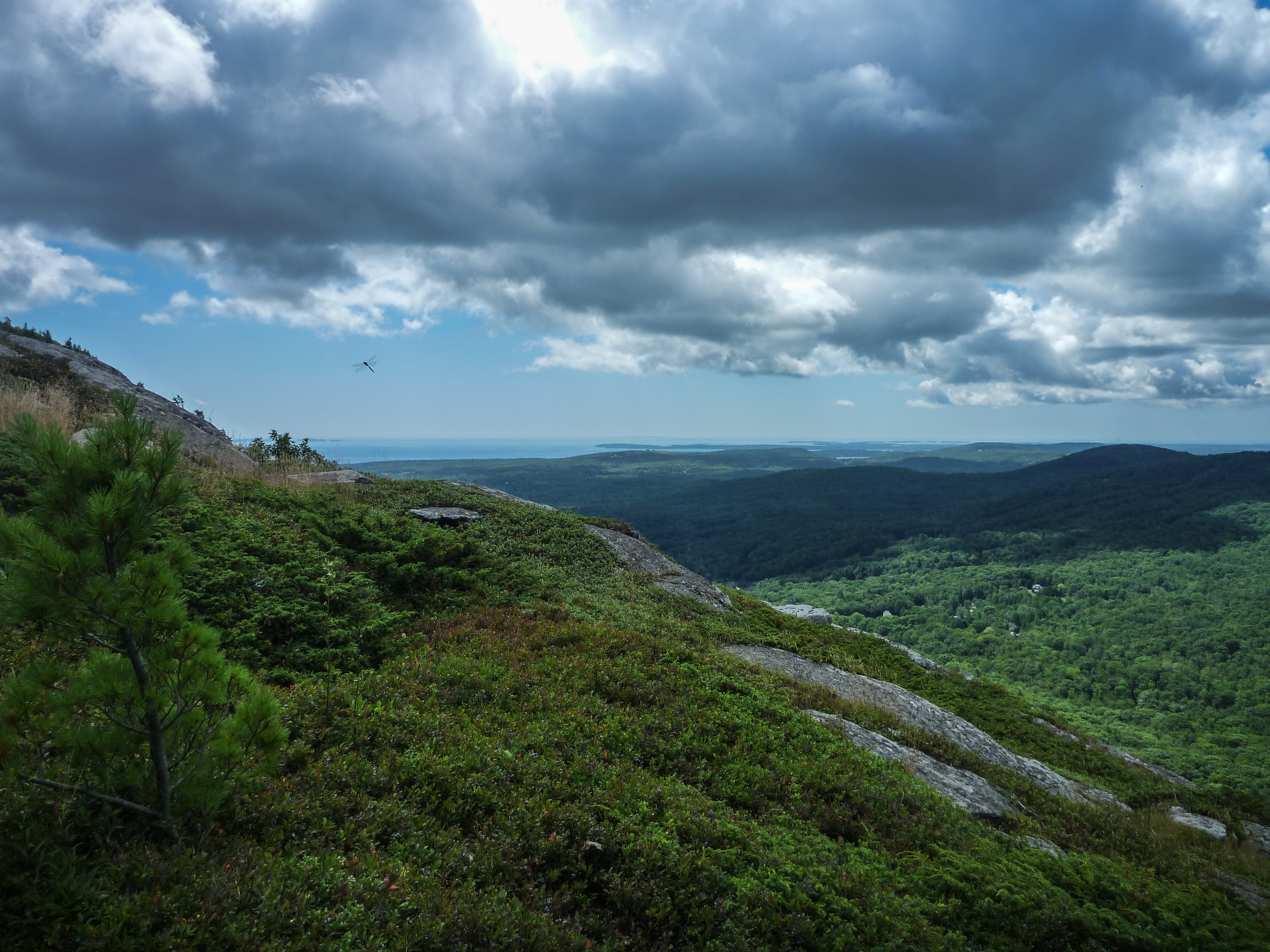
The view from Bald Mountain, Camden

According to the U.S. Census Bureau, the town has a total area of 26.65 square miles (69.02 km^{2}), of which 18.24 square miles (47.24 km^{2}) is land and 8.41 square miles (21.78 km^{2}) is water. Drained by the Megunticook River, Camden is located beside Penobscot Bay and the Gulf of Maine, part of the Atlantic Ocean. Principal bodies of water include: Megunticook Lake, Hosmer Pond (54 acres), Impoundment (Seabright Pond) (74 acres) and Lily Pond (32 acres). Mount Megunticook has an elevation of 1385 feet (419 m).

The town is crossed by U. S. Route 1 and state routes 52 and 105. It borders the towns of Rockport to the south, Hope to the southwest, and Lincolnville to the north.

=== Climate ===
Like most of New England, Camden has a humid continental climate with wide variations in temperature between seasons.

Climate data for W ROCKPORT 1 NNW, ME (1991–2020 normals)
Month	Jan	Feb	Mar	Apr	May	Jun	Jul	Aug	Sep	Oct	Nov	Dec	Year
Mean daily maximum °F (°C)	30.3 (−0.9)	32.5 (0.3)	39.6 (4.2)	51.4 (10.8)	62.4 (16.9)	70.8 (21.6)	76.7 (24.8)	76.3 (24.6)	69.0 (20.6)	57.2 (14.0)	46.7 (8.2)	36.4 (2.4)	54.1 (12.3)
Daily mean °F (°C)	21.2 (−6.0)	23.1 (−4.9)	30.9 (−0.6)	42.5 (5.8)	53.3 (11.8)	62.1 (16.7)	68.2 (20.1)	67.7 (19.8)	60.5 (15.8)	49.0 (9.4)	38.9 (3.8)	28.3 (−2.1)	45.5 (7.5)
Mean daily minimum °F (°C)	12.0 (−11.1)	13.6 (−10.2)	22.2 (−5.4)	33.6 (0.9)	44.1 (6.7)	53.5 (11.9)	59.6 (15.3)	59.2 (15.1)	51.9 (11.1)	40.9 (4.9)	31.1 (−0.5)	20.2 (−6.6)	36.8 (2.7)
Average precipitation inches (mm)	4.75 (121)	4.20 (107)	5.01 (127)	5.21 (132)	4.22 (107)	4.49 (114)	3.20 (81)	3.37 (86)	4.49 (114)	6.07 (154)	5.27 (134)	5.92 (150)	56.20 (1,427)
Average snowfall inches (cm)	17.2 (44)	19.2 (49)	11.3 (29)	3.5 (8.9)	0.0 (0.0)	0.0 (0.0)	0.0 (0.0)	0.0 (0.0)	0.0 (0.0)	0.2 (0.51)	2.3 (5.8)	15.0 (38)	68.7 (174)
Average precipitation days (≥ 0.01 in)	9.8	8.8	9.8	10.8	11.8	11.7	10.5	9.3	8.9	11.0	9.7	11.9	124.0
Average snowy days (≥ 0.1 in)	5.5	5.7	3.5	1.1	0.0	0.0	0.0	0.0	0.0	0.1	0.7	4.2	20.8
Source: NOAA

== Demographics ==
Historical population
Census	Pop.	Note	%±
1790	331		—
1800	872		163.4%
1810	1,607		84.3%
1820	1,825		13.6%
1830	2,200		20.5%
1840	3,005		36.6%
1850	4,005		33.3%
1860	4,588		14.6%
1870	4,512		−1.7%
1880	4,386		−2.8%
1890	4,621		5.4%
1900	2,825		−38.9%
1910	3,015		6.7%
1920	3,403		12.9%
1930	3,606		6.0%
1940	3,554		−1.4%
1950	3,670		3.3%
1960	3,988		8.7%
1970	4,115		3.2%
1980	4,584		11.4%
1990	5,060		10.4%
2000	5,254		3.8%
2010	4,850		−7.7%
2020	5,232		7.9%
U.S. Decennial Census

=== 2010 census ===
As of the census of 2010, there were 4,850 people, 2,382 households, and 1,313 families residing in the town. The population density was 265.9 inhabitants per square mile (102.7/km^{2}). There were 3,165 housing units at an average density of 173.5 per square mile (67.0/km^{2}). The racial makeup of the town was 97.6% White, 0.3% African American, 0.1% Native American, 0.7% Asian, 0.2% from other races, and 1.0% from two or more races. Hispanic or Latino of any race were 1.1% of the population.

There were 2,382 households, of which 21.4% had children under the age of 18 living with them, 43.7% were married couples living together, 8.3% had a female householder with no husband present, 3.1% had a male householder with no wife present, and 44.9% were non-families. 39.2% of all households were made up of individuals, and 22.4% had someone living alone who was 65 years of age or older. The average household size was 2.01 and the average family size was 2.65.

The median age in the town was 53.2 years. 17.9% of residents were under the age of 18; 4.7% were between the ages of 18 and 24; 16.2% were from 25 to 44; 33.5% were from 45 to 64; and 27.7% were 65 years of age or older. The gender makeup of the town was 45.6% male and 54.4% female.

=== 2000 census ===
At the 2000 census, there were 5,254 people, 2,390 households and 1,414 families residing in the town. The population density was 287.3 inhabitants per square mile (110.9/km^{2}). There were 2,883 housing units at an average density of 157.6 per square mile (60.8/km^{2}). The racial makeup of the town was 98.33% White, 0.25% Black, 0.13% Native American, 0.40% Asian, 0.15% from other races, and 0.74% from two or more races. Hispanic or Latino of any race were 0.86% of the population.

There were 2,390 households, of which 24.1% had children under the age of 18 living with them, 49.1% were married couples living together, 8.5% had a divorced female householder, and 40.8% were non-families. 34.8% of all households were made up of individuals, and 16.5% had someone living alone who was 65 years of age or older. The average household size was 2.11 and the average family size was 2.71.

The age distribution was 19.7% under the age of 18, 4.4% from 18 to 24, 22.2% from 25 to 44, 30.3% from 45 to 64, and 23.4% who were 65 years of age or older. The median age was 47 years. For every 100 females, there were 83.6 males. For every 100 females age 18 and over, there were 77.1 males.

The median household income was $39,877, and the median family income was $56,439. Males had a median income of $33,500 versus $26,645 for females. The per capita income for the town was $26,126. About 5.5% of families and 8.0% of the population were below the poverty line, including 6.5% of those under age 18 and 7.2% of those age 65 or over.

=== Ancestry/ethnicity ===
As of 2017 the largest self-identified ancestry groups/ethnic groups in Camden, Maine were:

Largest ancestries (2017)	Percent
English	28.1%
Irish	19.7%
German	14.1%
Scottish	11.6%
Italian	7.0%
French (except Basque)	6.3%
French Canadian	3.7%
Russian	3.6%
Swedish	3.4%
Dutch	3.3%
Welsh	2.7%
Portuguese	2.3%

== Education ==
It is within School Administrative District 28 (MSAD 28) and the Five Town Community School District, an elementary school district and a high school district, respectively. MSAD 28 operates Camden Rockport Elementary School, and Camden Rockport Middle School. The Five Town district operates Camden Hills Regional High School.

== Sites of interest ==
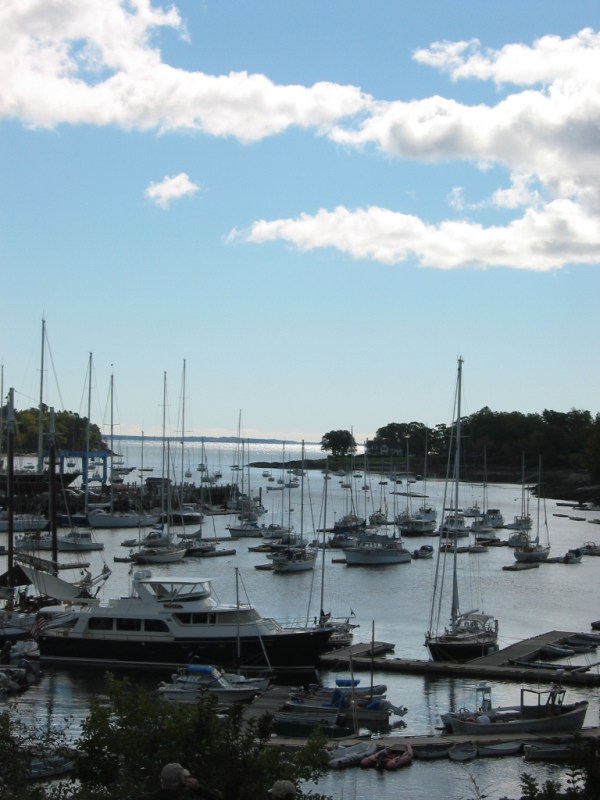
Camden harbor

- Bay Chamber Concerts
- Camden Hills State Park
- Camden Hills Regional High School.
- Camden National Bank
- Camden Opera House
- Camden Public Library
- Camden Snow Bowl
- Curtis Island Lighthouse

== Notable people ==
- Kay Aldridge, model, actress
- Gordon Bok, singer and songwriter
- Eva Maria Brown (1856-1917), social reformer
- Carleton F. Bryant, U.S. Navy Vice admiral and veteran of both World Wars
- Charles Cawley, founder of MBNA
- David G. Conover, documentary film and television director
- William Conway, Navy quartermaster
- Cyrus Curtis, publishing tycoon
- Paul Doiron, novelist
- Victoria Doudera, politician; resides in Camden
- Jeremiah W. Farnham, sea captain
- Harold Allen Fernald, publishing executive
- Tess Gerritsen, novelist
- John Gribbel, banker and businessman
- Joseph Hall, congressman
- Glenn Jenks, composer and pianist
- David McCullough, historian and author
- Don McLean, singer and songwriter
- Edna St. Vincent Millay, Pulitzer prize-winning poet
- David Miramant, Maine state legislator
- O. Stillman Rockefeller, member of the Rockefeller family
- Richard Russo, novelist
- John Sculley, industrialist and former CEO of Apple
- Matthew Simmons, investment banker
- Ephraim K. Smart, congressman and founder of the Maine Free Press
- Thomas J. Watson, industrialist and founder of IBM
- Jonas Wheeler, first Camden representative to the Maine House of Representatives
- Matthew Wilkas, actor and playwright

== Free land ==
Camden made national headlines in 2010 after it was announced that the town would be giving some land away (2.8 acres and a run-down leather tannery) for "free", on the condition that a prospective business owner would have to pay $175,000 to the town of Camden and create 24 "full-time" jobs. As of 2012, Camden had found no takers; in fact, the land was still available for "free" as of 2018.

== See also ==
- Center for Creative Imaging
