= Classic College International =

College in Kathmandu, Nepal

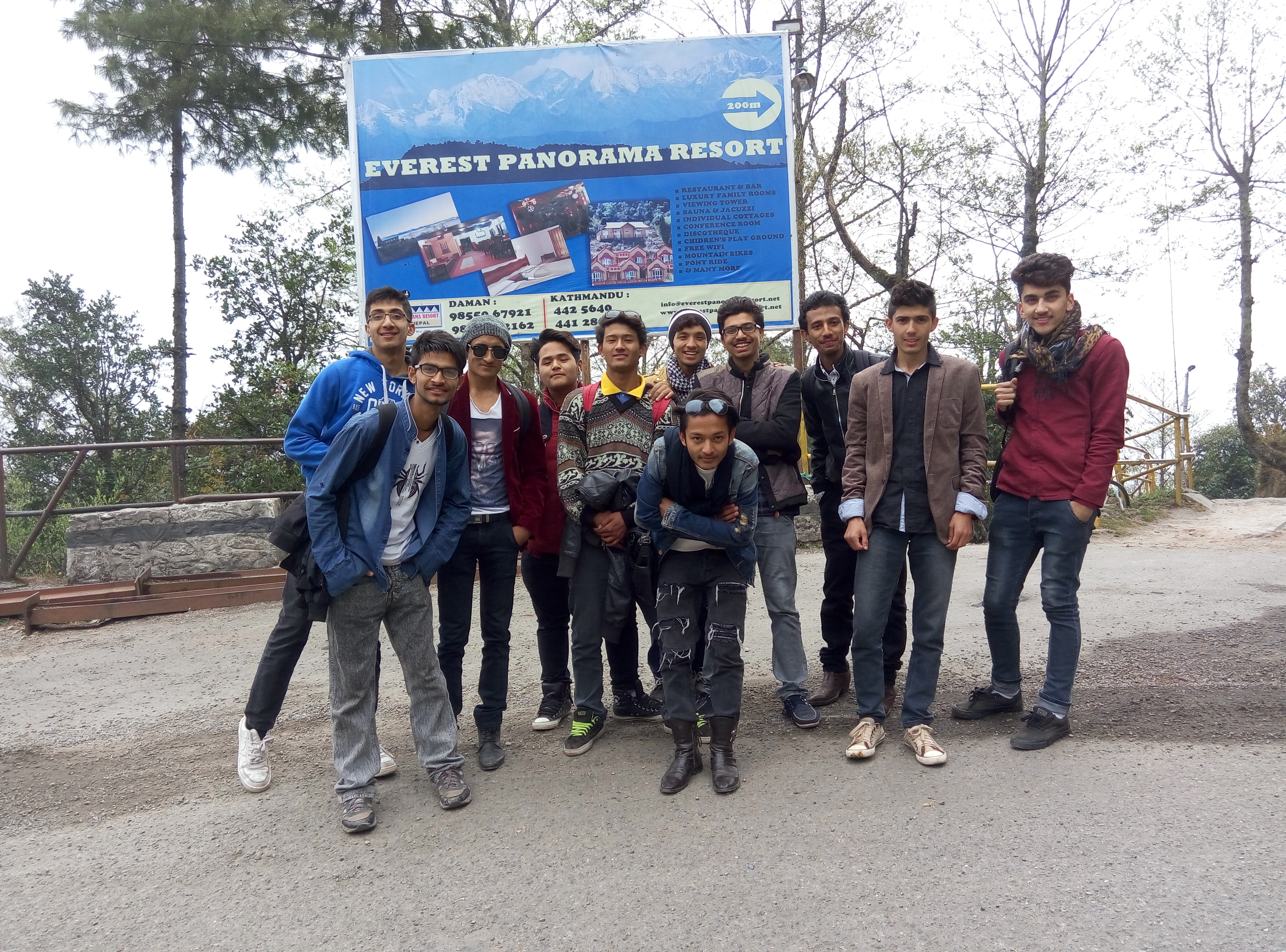
- Trip to Daman by CCI
- Type: College
- Established: 1999
- Principal: Mani Kumar Poudel
- Address: Pingala Marg, Kathmandu, Nepal

Classic College International (CCI) is a private college located at Pingala Marg, Gaushala, in Kathmandu, Nepal. The college was established in 2056 BS (1999 AD) at Thapathali and was later relocated to Gaushala in 2062 BS (2005 AD).

Classic College International offers higher secondary (+2) programmes in Science, Management, and Humanities, as well as undergraduate programmes including Bachelor of Business Administration (BBA), Bachelor of Social Work (BSW), and Bachelor of Business Studies (BBS). The institution conducts its academic programmes on a regular basis.

As of 2024, the principal of the college is Mani Kumar Poudel.

== Photo gallery ==
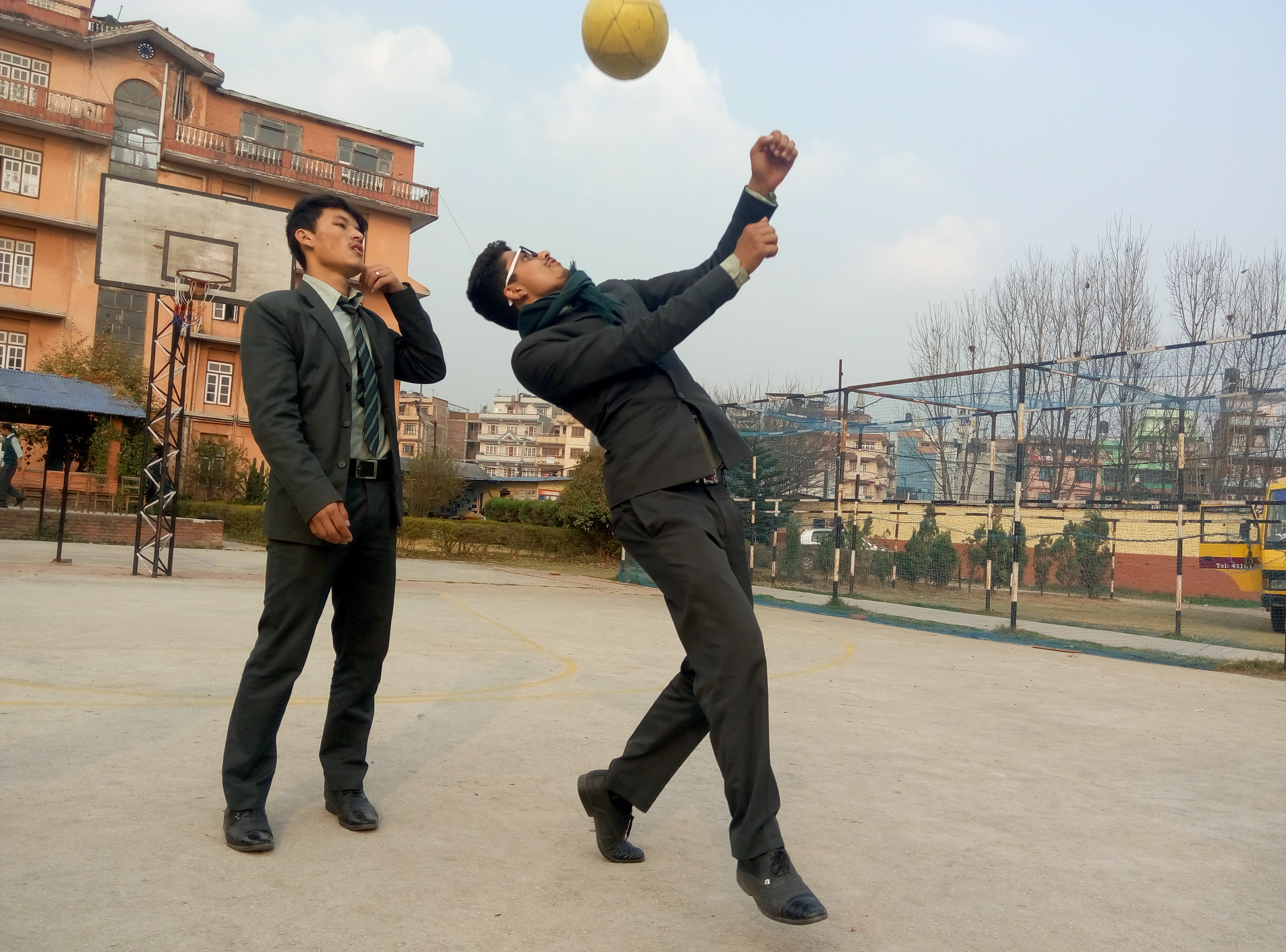
Sports at CCI

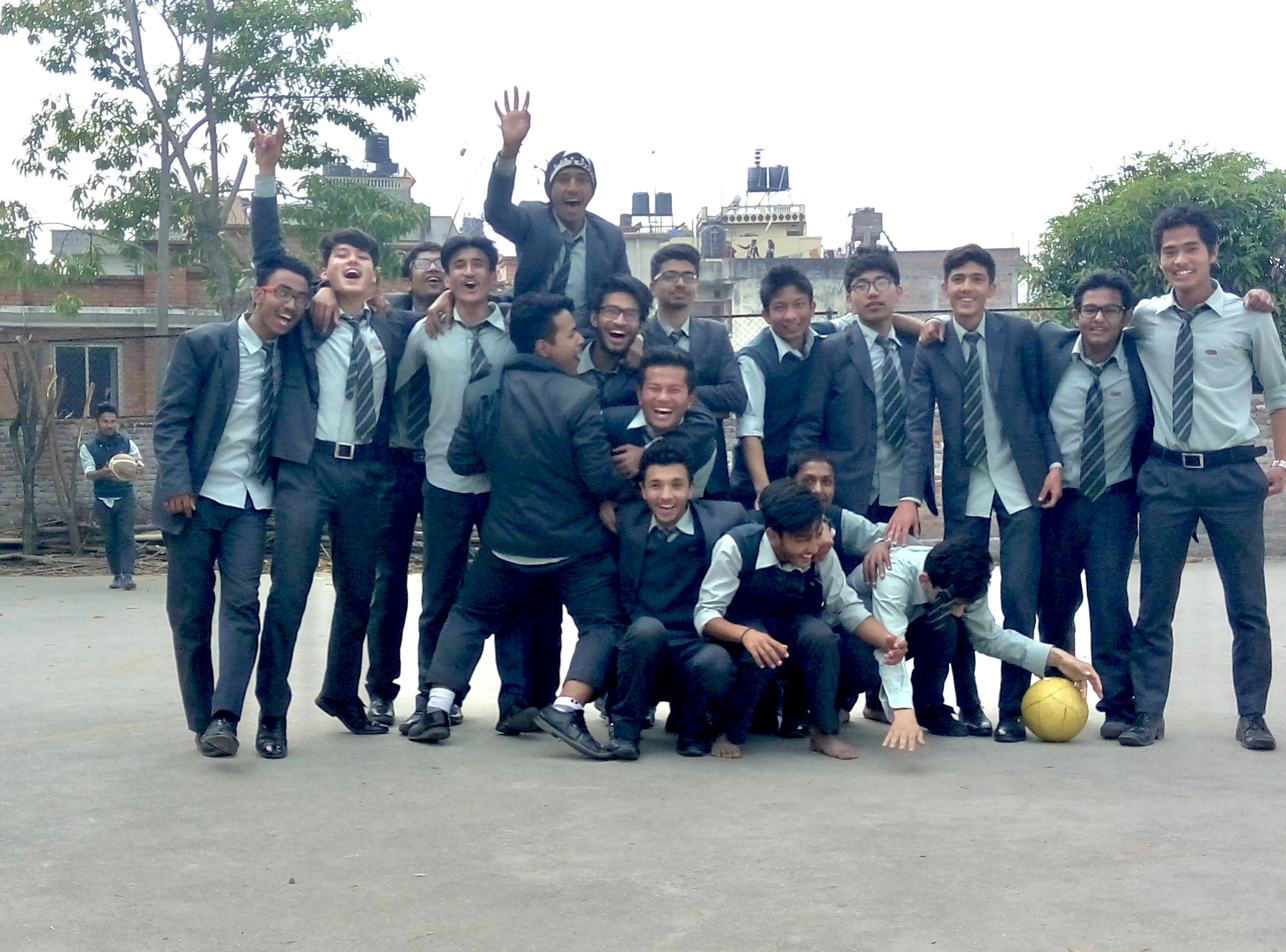
College sports team

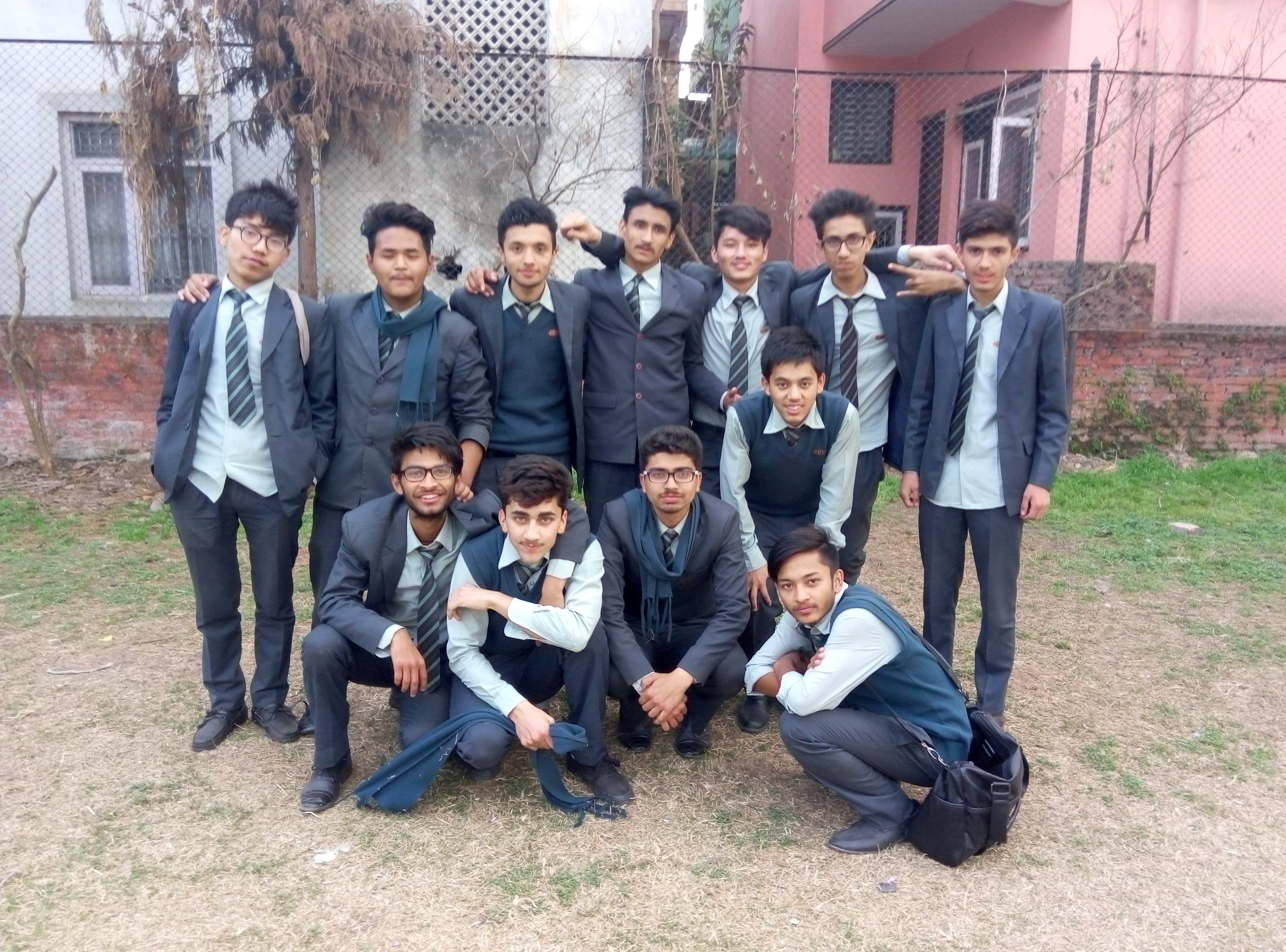
Students of Classic College International
