= USS Conway (DD-507) =

Fletcher-class destroyer

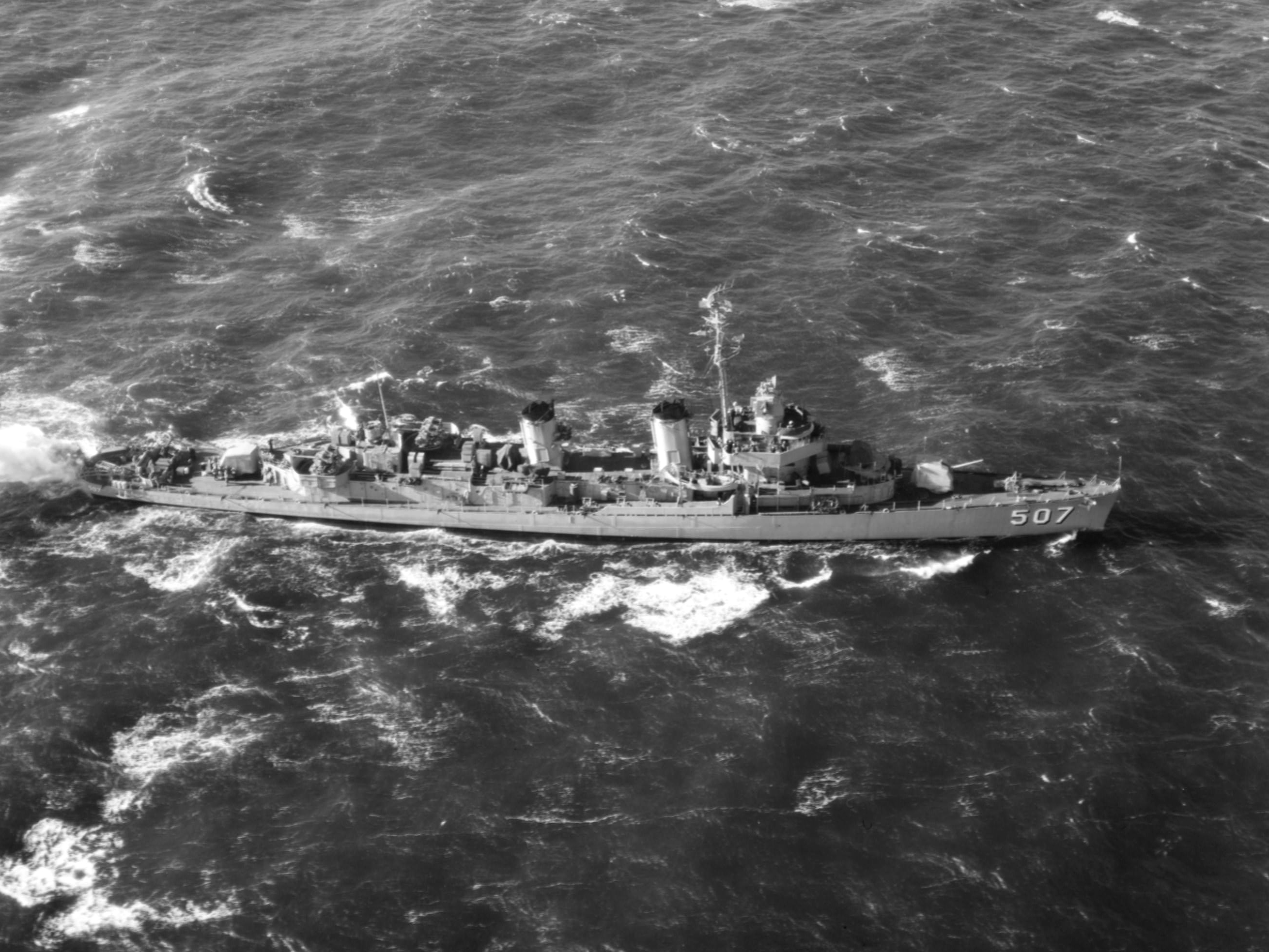
- USS Conway (DDE-507) on 6 December 1950

History

United States
- Namesake: William Conway
- Builder: Bath Iron Works
- Laid down: 5 November 1941
- Launched: 16 August 1942
- Commissioned: 9 October 1942
- Decommissioned: 15 November 1969
- Fate: Sunk as a target 26 June 1970

General characteristics
- Class & type: Fletcher-class destroyer
- Displacement: 2,050 tons
- Length: 376 ft 6 in (114.7 m)
- Beam: 39 ft 8 in (12.1 m)
- Draft: 17 ft 9 in (5.4 m)
- Propulsion: 60,000 shp (45 MW); 2 propellers
- Speed: 35 knots (65 km/h; 40 mph)
- Range: 6500 nm at 15 kn (12,000 km at 28 km/h)
- Complement: 336
- Armament: 5 × single Mk 12 5 in (127 mm)/38 guns; 5 × twin 40 mm (1.6 in) Bofors AA guns; 7 × single 20 mm (0.8 in) Oerlikon AA guns; 2 × quintuple 21 in (533 mm) torpedo tubes; 6 × single depth charge throwers; 2 × depth charge racks

USS Conway (DD/DDE-507), a Fletcher-class destroyer, was the second ship of the United States Navy to be named for William Conway, who distinguished himself during the Civil War.

Conway was laid down 5 November 1941, launched 16 August 1942 by Bath Iron Works, Bath, Maine, sponsored by the wife of Captain Frank E. Beatty, U.S.N., Naval aide to the Secretary of Navy in part of the largest mass launch to that point in the war shipbuilding program and the largest in Maine's history in which five British Ocean type freighters, the Liberty SS Ethan Allen, USS Cony and Conway were launched. The ship was commissioned 9 October 1942.

== Service history ==
=== World War II ===
==== 1943 ====
Conway cleared Norfolk 5 December 1942 for Nouméa, and Efate and arrived 13 January. She put to sea 27 January as her force sailed to meet Japanese ships evacuating troops from Guadalcanal. On 29 and 30 January, her force came under heavy enemy air attack in the Battle of Rennell Island. Conway splashed several enemy planes, and rescued survivors of Chicago. Throughout February, she patrolled between Espiritu Santo and Guadalcanal, and between 4 and 6 March, participated in the bombardment of Vila Stanmore and a shipping sweep of Kula Gulf.

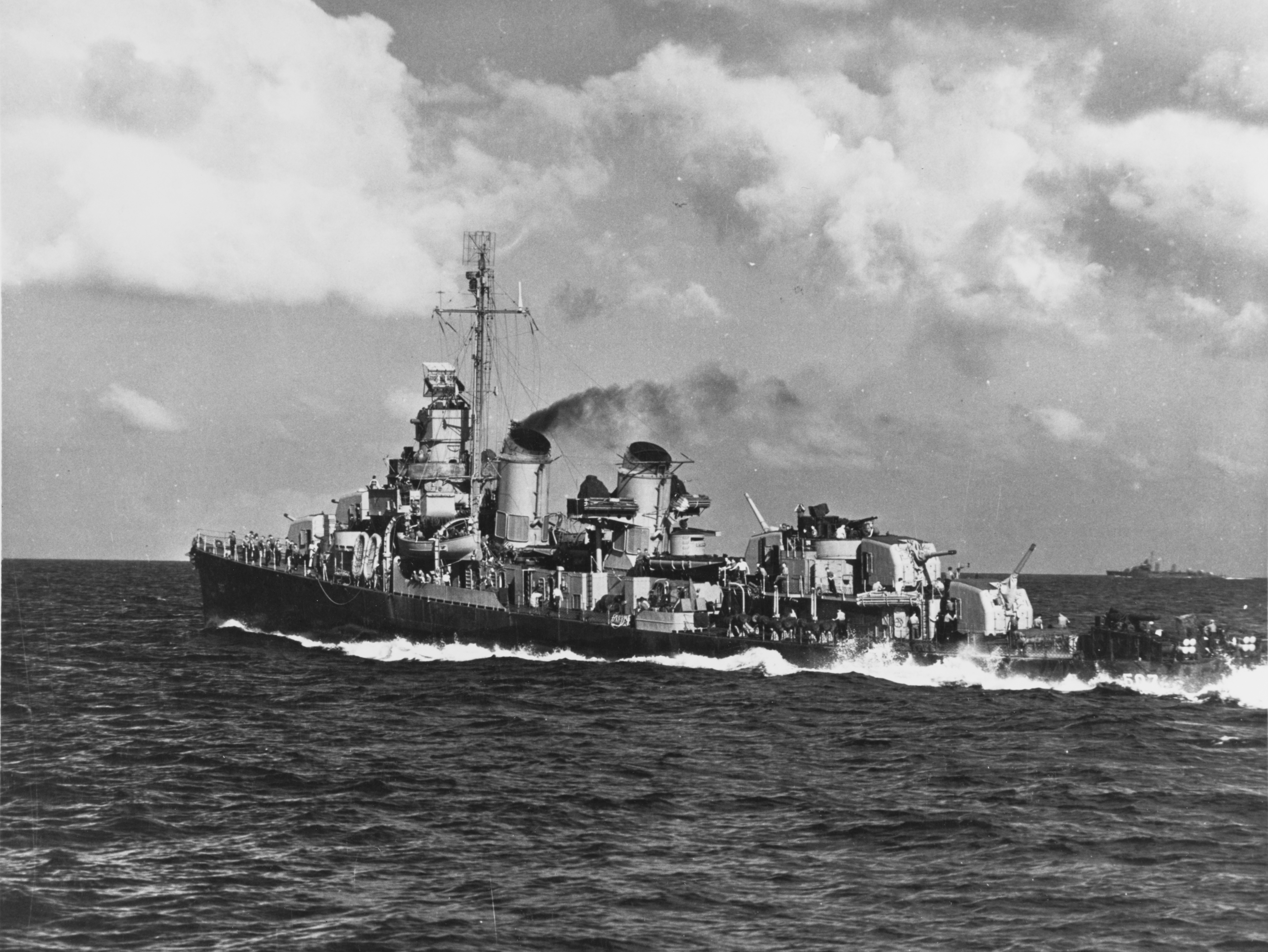
Conway in August 1943.

From 10 March 1943 Conway had patrol duty and conducted training from Efate. She sailed from Efate 15 June in support of the Rendova landings, escorting supply ships, then had the same duty for the New Georgia operations, and conducted bombardments of Kolombangara and Munda. Between 26 July and 12 August, she operated out of Purvis Bay, escorting fueling units and making night raids on Japanese shipping "up the Slot". She sailed from Purvis Bay 13 August to take part in the Vella Lavella operation, escorted LSTs and supply ships in to the beach, and then took up patrol north and west of the island. She returned to Guadalcanal 30 August escorting transports carrying the First Marine Raiders, and until 12 September conducted night raids on enemy barges off Guadalcanal.

After overhaul in the Fiji Islands and at Sydney, Australia, Conway returned to Southwest Pacific operations in October 1943. On 27 October she participated in the initial landings in the Treasury Islands, and then in landings on Choiseul. She supported the landings at Bougainville on 29 October, and until 10 February 1944, she continued operations in support of troops ashore on Bougainville, escorting reinforcement convoys and firing on shore targets. Between 11 and 17 February, she participated in the landings on Green Island, then returned to her Bougainville operations.

==== 1944 ====
Between 28 February 1944 and 17 March, Conway bombarded targets in New Britain and New Ireland by day, and conducted searches for enemy shipping by night in the waters off these islands, and until 4 May, continued operations in the Solomons on escort duty, patrol, and in exercises with cruisers.

On 8 May, at Majuro, Conway joined the 5th Fleet. She sailed from Majuro 14 May for Pearl Harbor and Kwajalein, where she loaded troops for the Saipan operation, landed them 15 June under heavy gunfire, and served as close fire support and screening vessel off the island. After replenishing at Eniwetok, Conway joined in the preassault bombardment of Guam and Tinian, remaining to cover the landings at Tinian. She continued to operate in the Mariana Islands campaign until 12 August, when she cleared for San Francisco and overhaul.

Conway returned to Ulithi 21 November 1944 to join the 7th Fleet. She put to sea at once to patrol in Leyte Gulf, join in an antishipping sweep in Camotes Sea, and fire in the bombardment of Plompon and Ormoc Bay. After replenishing at Kossol Roads, Conway covered the Mindoro landings, then patrolled west of Mindoro in the Sulu Sea until 23 December, when she put into Manus.

==== 1945 ====
Conway sailed again 31 December for the initial landings on Lingayen, Corregidor, and Parang, and continued operating in Philippine waters until June 1945. On 7 June, Conway sailed from Subic Bay in the distant covering group for the Brunei Bay operation. She covered minesweeping and fired in preassault bombardment at Balikpapan, guarded an underwater demolition team as it prepared the beach, and conducted bombardment during the actual landings. She rested briefly at Leyte. and then took part in the landings at Saragani Bay, Mindanao.

With the close of the war, Conway began patrolling east of Leyte Gulf, and supported minesweeping operations in the Yellow Sea, visiting Okinawa and Qingdao. She put into Jinsen, Korea, from 20 to 24 September 1945, and then sailed in the South and East China Seas as flagship of the forces lifting Chinese troops from Indo-China to Formosa and Manchuria until 29 December, when she sailed from Shanghai for San Diego, New York City, and Charleston, arriving 13 March. Conway was placed out of commission in reserve 25 June 1946, berthed at Charleston.

=== Post war ===
Conway was recommissioned at Boston 8 November 1950, following her conversion to an escort destroyer (DDE-507). After training, she departed Norfolk 14 May 1951 for Sasebo, arriving 15 June. She escorted a convoy from Shandong to Manchuria, participated in hunter-killer exercises off Okinawa, and screened Task Force 77 (TF 77) off the coast of Korea. Between 14 and 28 October, Conway fired in bombardments at Kolgochi-Ri, Hodo Pando, Hungnam, and Wonsan, and patrolled in these areas. She departed Sasebo 31 October for the Suez Canal, crossed the Mediterranean and the Atlantic, and returned to Norfolk 20 December.

Conway operated from her home port at Norfolk on coastwise and Caribbean training operations and on 16 September 1953 sailed for her first North Atlantic Treaty Organization (NATO) exercise, in the North Atlantic, continuing to a tour of duty in the Mediterranean with the 6th Fleet, returning to Norfolk 8 February 1954. Her training concentrated on antisubmarine warfare, and in 1955 and 1957 she returned to the Mediterranean, in 1957 patrolling the eastern Mediterranean and the Dardanelles during the crisis in Jordan. In the early fall of 1957, she visited ports of northern Europe while joining in NATO exercises, and from January to March 1958, tested new antisubmarine weapons off Key West.

In April 1958, Conway put to sea with TF Alfa, a group experimenting with antisubmarine tactics, and through the remainder of 1958, 1959, and 1960 spent most of her time at sea with this force. In June 1960, she visited Quebec City, Canada, and in December of that year participated in the rescue of survivors of a merchant tanker which had broken in two off Cape Hatteras.

Conway reverted to DD-507 30 June 1962.

The Conway was deployed in Wes Pac Vietnam from July 1966 through December 1966.

Conway was stricken from the Naval Vessel Register 15 November 1969. She was sunk as a target 26 June 1970.

== Awards ==
Conway was awarded 13 battle stars for her World War II service and two for Korean War service.
