= Megunticook River =

Location
- Country: United States
- State: Maine
- County: Knox County

Physical characteristics
- Source
  - location: Megunticook Lake, Maine
  - elevation: 142 feet (43 m)
- Mouth
  - location: Penobscot Bay
  - coordinates: 44°12′36″N 69°03′47″W
  - elevation: sea level
- Length: 3.5 mi (5.6 km)
- Basin size: 32 mi^{2} (83 km^{2})

The Megunticook River is a 3.5-mile (5.6 km) river in Camden, Maine. It flows southeast from Megunticook Lake through downtown Camden to the harbour in west Penobscot Bay. The name "Megunticook" is derived from a Wabanaki word meaning "Great Swells of the Sea."

== Geography ==
The river originates at the spillway of Megunticook Lake at coordinates 44°14′06″N 69°05′59″W. The 32-square-mile (83 km^{2}) Megunticook Watershed includes portions of Camden, Hope, Lincolnville, and Searsmont. The watershed's topography was formed by glacial activity during the Pleistocene epoch.

The headwaters originate in Searsmont and flow through Moody Pond, Levenseller Pond, Norton Pond, and Megunticook Lake before reaching the river proper. Land use within the watershed is 69% forested, with 8% open water and 4% woody wetlands.

== Hydrology and dam system ==
The river's flow is regulated by seven dams, most constructed in the 19th century for industrial purposes. The Town of Camden owns and operates four of these structures:

- East and West Dams – Control water levels in Megunticook Lake and Norton Pond
- Seabright Dam – Regulates the river impoundment upstream of Camden village
- Montgomery Dam – Manages water levels in the Mill Pond at Camden Harbor

Three additional dams (Powder Mill, Knowlton Street, and Knox Mill) are located between the Seabright and Montgomery dams.

== Ecology ==
The river system historically supported anadromous fish populations. A 2021 feasibility study identified seven species that could potentially utilize the river for spawning: alewife, blueback herring, Atlantic salmon, American eel, sea lamprey, brook trout, and rainbow smelt.

Currently, fish populations consist primarily of stocked species including rainbow trout and brook trout, along with largemouth bass, smallmouth bass, eels, and various panfish. Multiple dams create barriers that prevent sea-run fish migration, with only occasional American eels able to navigate upstream.

The river remains on Maine's list of impaired water bodies due to elevated bacteria levels and inability to support native fish populations.

== History ==
=== Colonial and industrial development ===
Settlement began in the late 1700s, with Camden's first mill constructed in 1771 by William Minot. The river became central to local economic development, powering mills that produced flour, textiles, anchors, and gunpowder. At its industrial peak, the river system included 11 dams and 15 mills.

In the 1790s, dam construction for Molyneaux's sawmill and gristmill flooded hundreds of acres, creating the current Megunticook Lake. During the 19th and early 20th centuries, textile mill discharge occasionally colored the river according to dyes being used.

=== 20th century to present ===
Industrial activity declined in the 20th century, and many mills ceased operation. In 1992, ownership of the Montgomery Dam transferred to the Town of Camden, making the municipality responsible for maintenance of a structure no longer serving its original industrial purpose.

== Montgomery Dam management debate ==
=== Technical studies ===
In 2018, facing repair costs, Camden commissioned a feasibility study of dam management options. The study identified flood risk increases and fish passage barriers associated with the Montgomery Dam. In 2021, the town contracted Inter-Fluve, a river restoration engineering firm, to conduct additional analysis.

The Inter-Fluve study concluded that removing the Montgomery Dam and three upstream structures would provide benefits for fish passage, flood risk reduction, and long-term maintenance costs.

=== Community positions ===
Dam removal proposals generated public debate. Supporters cited potential benefits including restored fish migration, reduced flood risk, and lower long-term municipal costs. Opposition groups, including Save the Dam Falls, emphasized the scenic value of the existing waterfall and questioned project costs and environmental benefits.

=== 2025 referendum ===
On June 10, 2025, Camden voters approved a referendum authorizing Montgomery Dam removal by a vote of 1,391 to 995. The measure requires funding from non-property tax sources and Camden Public Library board approval for any Harbor Park modifications.

The decision followed recommendations from the Megunticook River Citizens Advisory Committee, established in 2022, and the Camden Public Library Board of Trustees.

== Current management ==
In 2022, Camden received $1.6 million from the National Fish and Wildlife Foundation and National Oceanic and Atmospheric Administration through the National Coastal Resiliency Fund. The grant supports engineering studies for the four lower dams and fish passage design for the three upper dams.

The town operates the dams according to established water level management policies, with daily monitoring by a dam control agent who opens and closes gates for flood control and aesthetic purposes.

== See also ==
- List of rivers of Maine
- Megunticook Lake
- Camden, Maine
- Knox County, Maine
