= HMS Conway Castle =

Two ships of the Royal Navy have been named HMS Conway Castle after Conwy Castle in Wales.

- HMS Conway Castle (1804) acquired c. 1804, was an Irish gun vessel hired to fight in the Napoleonic Wars.
- HMS Conway Castle (FY509), launched in 1916, was a 274-ton naval trawler. She was commissioned by the Royal Navy in August 1939 and served as a minesweeper during World War II.
