= 1998 in association football =

The following are the association football events of the year 1998 throughout the world.

== Events ==
- 1998 FIFA World Cup – France wins 3–0 over Brazil in Saint-Denis, France, winning their first cup. More than one million delirious fans jammed the Champs-Élysées, dancing through the night.
- UEFA Champions League: Real Madrid won 1–0 in the final against Juventus. This was Real Madrid's seventh European Cup title.
- Copa Libertadores 1998: Won by Vasco da Gama after defeating Barcelona SC on an aggregate score of 4–1.
- UEFA Cup Winners' Cup: Chelsea beat VfB Stuttgart 1–0 in the final, winning the Cup for the second time.
- UEFA Cup: Inter Milan won 3–0 in the final against Lazio. This was Inter's third UEFA Cup title.
- UEFA Super Cup: Chelsea beat Real Madrid 1–0, winning the cup for the first time.
- England:
  - FA Premier League Champions: Arsenal.
- February 17 – Manchester City fires manager Frank Clark and appoints Joe Royle as his successor.
- May 16 – Arsenal beats Newcastle United 2–0 to win the FA Cup, achieving The Double.
- August 16 – PSV wins the Johan Cruyff Shield, the annual opening of the new season in the Eredivisie, by a 2–0 win over Ajax in the Amsterdam Arena.
- September 17 – Heerenveen makes a winning European debut after defeating Poland's Amica Wronki (3–1) in the first round of the UEFA Cup Winners' Cup.
- October 8 – Manager Artur Jorge resigns at Dutch club Vitesse and is succeeded by Herbert Neumann.
- October 10 – Frank Rijkaard makes his debut as the manager of the Netherlands national team, as the successor of Guus Hiddink, with a 2–0 friendly win over Peru in Eindhoven. One player makes his debut as well: striker Jeffrey Talan from Heerenveen.
- December 1 – Real Madrid wins the Intercontinental Cup in Tokyo by defeating Brazil's Vasco da Gama: 2–1. The winning goal for the Spaniards is scored by Raúl in the 83rd minute.
- December 7 – Dutch club Sparta Rotterdam fires manager Hans van der Zee. He is replaced by Jan Everse on December 24.

== Winner national club championships ==
=== Asia ===
- Iran – Esteghlal FC
- Japan – Kashima Antlers
- Qatar – Al-Ittihad
- South Korea - Suwon Bluewings
- Thailand - Sinthana F.C.

=== Europe ===
- Croatia – Croatia Zagreb
- England – Arsenal
- France – Lens
- Germany – 1. FC Kaiserslautern
- Hungary – Újpest
- Italy – Juventus
- Netherlands – Ajax
- Poland – ŁKS Łódź
- Portugal – Porto
- Scotland – Celtic
- Spain – Barcelona
- Sweden – AIK
- Turkey – Galatasaray
- FR Yugoslavia – Obilić

=== North America ===
- Canada – St. Catharines Wolves (CPSL)
- Mexico
  - Verano – Toluca
  - Invierno – Necaxa
- United States – Chicago Fire (MLS)

=== South America ===
- Argentina
  - Clausura – Vélez Sársfield
  - Apertura – Boca Juniors
- Bolivia – Blooming
- Brazil – Corinthians
- Chile – Colo-Colo
- Ecuador – LDU Quito
- Paraguay – Olimpia Asunción
- Peru – Universitario de Deportes

== International tournaments ==
- African Cup of Nations in Burkina Faso (February 7 – 28 1998)
  1. Egypt
  2. South Africa
  3. DR Congo
- Baltic Cup (April 21 – June 25, 1998)
  1. Lithuania
  2. Latvia
  3. Estonia
- FIFA World Cup in France (June 10 – July 12, 1998)
  1. France
  2. Brazil
  3. Croatia

== Births ==
- January 2 – Timothy Fosu-Mensah, Dutch footballer
- January 3 – Patrick Cutrone, Italian footballer
- January 5 – Carles Aleñá, Spanish footballer
- January 8 – Manuel Locatelli, Italian footballer
- January 10 – Mohamed Abukar, Somali footballer
- January 11 – Salih Özcan, German midfielder
- January 16 – Odsonne Édouard, French footballer
- January 17 – Conner Blöte, Dutch footballer
- January 21 – Borna Sosa, Croatian youth international
- January 29 – Theo Maia, Brazilian footballer
- February 3 – Blás Riveros, Paraguayan footballer
- February 10 – Aitor Buñuel, Spanish footballer
- February 17 – Todd Cantwell, English footballer
- March 3 – Nathan Vitré, French footballer
- March 10 – Matías Zaracho, Argentinian footballer
- March 23 – Ines Obradović, Montenegrin footballer
- March 28
  - John Håkansson, Swedish footballer
  - Sandi Lovric, Austrian footballer
- March 30 – Christopher Godet, Bahamian footballer
- April 10 – Jacob Brown, Scottish footballer
- April 21 – Victor Paraíba, Brazilian footballer
- April 24 – Elisabet Vang, Faroese footballer
- May 7
  - Alessandro Fratangelo, Italian footballer
  - Dani Olmo, Spanish footballer
- May 8 – Johannes Eggestein, German footballer
- May 11 – Fran Villalba, Spanish footballer
- May 23
  - Ross Cunningham, Scottish footballer
  - Luca De La Torre, American footballer
  - Berat Özdemir, Turkish footballer
- June 1 – Branimir Kalaica, Croatian footballer
- June 22 – Javairô Dilrosun, Dutch footballer
- June 28 – Óscar Rodríguez Arnaiz, Spanish footballer
- June 30
  - Tom Davies, English footballer
  - Houssem Aouar, French footballer
- July 6 – Hanna Lundell, Swedish footballer
- July 8 – Yann Karamoh, French footballer
- July 29 – Maximilian Schuster, German footballer
- September 1 – Emily Condon, Australian footballer
- September 2 – Lee Winroth, Swedish footballer
- September 17 – Gabriel Justino, Brazilian footballer
- September 18 – Christian Pulisic, American soccer player
- September 19 – Jacob Bruun Larsen, Danish footballer
- October 21 – Benjamin Cull, English footballer (died 2023)
- October 27 – Dayot Upamecano, French footballer
- November 12 – Jules Koundé, French footballer
- November 24 – Muhammad Rafli, Indonesian footballer
- November 30 – Kenedy Có, Guinea-Bissauan footballer
- December 17 – Martin Ødegaard, Norwegian footballer
- December 18
  - Calvin Stengs, Dutch footballer
  - Manuel Trías, Venezuelan footballer
- December 20 – Kylian Mbappé, French footballer
- December 24 – Alexis Mac Allister, Argentine footballer
- December 29 – Victor Osimhen, Nigerian footballer

== Deaths ==
=== May ===
- May 2 – Justin Fashanu (38), English footballer and the first professional footballer to come out as gay

=== June ===
- June 4 – Miguel Montuori (65), Argentinian-Chilean footballer
- June 13 – Fernand Sastre (74), French footballer

=== July ===
- July 13 – Pierre Garonnaire (82), French footballer

=== August ===
- August 6 – Henk Bosveld (57), Dutch footballer

=== September ===
- September 2 – Jackie Blanchflower (65), Northern Irish footballer
- September 23 – Héctor Vilches, Uruguayan defender, winner of the 1950 World Cup. (88)
