= Winroth =

Winroth is a surname that was found in the USA and Scotland between 1880 and 1920. Notable people with the surname include:

- Anders Winroth (born 1965), Swedish-born American medievalist
- Jon Winroth (1935–2006), American wine critic
- Lee Winroth (born 1998), Swedish footballer

== See also ==
- Weinroth
