= Chestnut Street Historic District =

Chestnut Street Historic District may refer to:

- Chestnut Street Historic District (Hays, Kansas), listed on the National Register of Historic Places in Ellis County, Kansas
- Chestnut Street Historic District (Camden, Maine), listed on the National Register of Historic Places in Knox County, Maine
- Chestnut Street Historic District (Kingston, New York), listed on the National Register of Historic Places in Ulster County, New York

== See also ==
- Chestnut Street District, a historic district in Salem, Massachusetts
