= Fratangelo =

Fratangelo is an Italian surname. Notable people with the surname include:

- Alessandro Fratangelo (born 1998), Italian footballer
- Bjorn Fratangelo (born 1993), American tennis player
- Luigi Fratangelo (born 1958), Australian weightlifter
