= List of shipwrecks in July 1853 =

The list of shipwrecks in July 1853 includes ships sunk, foundered, wrecked, grounded, or otherwise lost during July 1853.

== 1 July ==
List of shipwrecks: 1 July 1853
| Ship | State | Description |
|---|---|---|
| Lord Elphinstone | United Kingdom | The barque foundered off Copang, Netherlands East Indies (10°15′S 126°10′E). Her crew survived. |

== 2 July ==
List of shipwrecks: 2 July 1853
| Ship | State | Description |
|---|---|---|
| Kalmia | United Kingdom | The ship was driven ashore near Callao, Peru. She was on a voyage from Callao to an English port. She was declared a total loss. |
| Tasmania | (United Kingdom of Great Britain and Ireland) New South Wales | The ship was wrecked in the Pacific Ocean. Her crew were rescued. She was on a voyage from Sydney to Singapore. |

== 3 July ==
List of shipwrecks: 3 July 1853
| Ship | State | Description |
|---|---|---|
| Amethyst | United Kingdom | The schooner was wrecked on the Anegada de Afuera Reef, off the coast of Mexico. Her crew were rescued. She was on a voyage from Liverpool, Lancashire to Veracruz, Mexico. |

== 4 July ==
List of shipwrecks: 4 July 1853
| Ship | State | Description |
|---|---|---|
| Atalante | Danzig | The ship was driven ashore on Læsø, Denmark. She was on a voyage from Danzig to an English port. She was later refloated. |
| Nautilus | (United Kingdom of Great Britain and Ireland) Van Diemen's Land | The cutter capsized in a squall off Three Hut Point with the loss of three of her crew. She was on a voyage from Port Cygnet to Hobart. |

== 5 July ==
List of shipwrecks: 5 July 1853
| Ship | State | Description |
|---|---|---|
| Daisy | United Kingdom | The ship was driven ashore at Cape Race, Newfoundland, British North America. Her crew were rescued. She was on a voyage from Harbour Grace, Newfoundland to Quebec City, Province of Canada, British North America. She was refloated and towed in to Renews, Newfoundland. |
| Nettuno | Brazil | The brigantine foundered in the Bristol Channel. Her crew were rescued. She was on a voyage from Swansea, Glamorgan to the Cape Verde Islands. |
| Tino | United Kingdom | The ship ran aground at Chichester, Sussex. She was refloated the next day and put in to Portsmouth, Hampshire in a leaky condition. |
| Wave | (United Kingdom of Great Britain and Ireland) Victoria | The schooner was driven ashore at Gillibrand's Point. She was refloated. |

== 6 July ==
List of shipwrecks: 6 July 1853
| Ship | State | Description |
|---|---|---|
| Elizabeth Pirie | United Kingdom | The ship capsized at Liverpool, Lancashire. |
| Nettuno | Brazil | The brig struck the Greengrounds, in the Bristol Channel and foundered. She was on a voyage from Swansea, Glamorgan, United Kingdom to the Cape Verde Islands, Portugal. |

== 7 July ==
List of shipwrecks: 7 July 1853
| Ship | State | Description |
|---|---|---|
| Daphne | (United Kingdom of Great Britain and Ireland) South Australia | The sloop was driven ashore at Point Malcolm. She was later refloated and taken in to Adelaide. |
| Independent | United Kingdom | The barque was damaged by an onboard explosion at Cardiff, Glamorgan with the loss of a crew member. |
| Pythe | United Kingdom | The ship was destroyed by fire at Old Calabar, Africa. Her crew were rescued. |

== 8 July ==
List of shipwrecks: 8 July 1853
| Ship | State | Description |
|---|---|---|
| Florence | United Kingdom | The ship ran aground on a reef off Toney River, Nova Scotia, British North America. She was on a voyage from London to Pugwash, Nova Scotia. She was consequently condemned. |
| Nina | United Kingdom | The brig ran aground in the Pacific Ocean (38°30′S 63°10′E) with the loss of three of her crew. Survivors were rescued on 15 July by the barque Antilles (United Kingdom). Nina was on a voyage from Bristol, Gloucestershire to Melbourne, and/or Port Phillip, Victoria. She was discovered on 19 July by Spirit of the North (United Kingdom). Her second mate and four hands boarded her and took her in to Batavia, Netherlands East Indies. |
| Olympus | United States | The ship was driven ashore at Savanilla, Republic of New Granada. She was refloated on 10 July and taken in to Savanilla. |
| Pelican | United Kingdom | The ship sprang a leak and foundered in Cardigan Bay. Her crew were rescued. She was on a voyage from Chester, Cheshire to London. |

== 9 July ==
List of shipwrecks: 9 July 1853
| Ship | State | Description |
|---|---|---|
| Adelaide | United Kingdom | The smack was wrecked at St. Alban's Head, Dorset. |
| Cavaliere Macedone | Austrian Empire | The brig capsized and sank at Hellevoetsluis, Zeeland, Netherlands. Her crew were rescued. She was on a voyage from Antwerp to Newcastle upon Tyne, Northumberland, United Kingdom. |
| Jack | United Kingdom | The ship was wrecked on the Great Barrier Reef. Her crew were rescued. She was on a voyage from Melbourne, Victoria to Singapore. |
| Lambrun | Flag unknown | The ship was driven ashore at Hastings, Sussex, United Kingdom. She was refloated the next day. |

== 10 July ==
List of shipwrecks: 10 July 1853
| Ship | State | Description |
|---|---|---|
| RMS Quito | United Kingdom | The paddle steamer struck rocks 12 miles (19 km) from Huasco, Chile and was wrecked with the loss of one passenger. She was on a voyage from Panama City, Republic of New Granada, to Valparaíso, Chile. |

== 11 July ==
List of shipwrecks: 11 July 1853
| Ship | State | Description |
|---|---|---|
| Blakely, or Blackney | United Kingdom | The barque capsized at South Shields, County Durham. She was righted. |
| Freedom | (United Kingdom of Great Britain and Ireland) Jersey | The ship was wrecked at Warrnambool, Victoria. |
| Friends | United Kingdom | The ship ran aground on the Holm Sand, in the North Sea off the coast of Suffolk. She was on a voyage from Seaham, County Durham to London. She was refloated and taken in to Lowestoft, Suffolk in a leaky condition. |
| Persia | United Kingdom | The ship was driven ashore near Holyhead, Anglesey. She was on a voyage from Quebec City, Province of Canada, British north America to Liverpool, Lancashire. She was refloated the next day and taken in to Liverpool. |
| Quatre Frères et Marie | France | The brigantine ran aground on the Newcombe Sand, in the North Sea off the coast of Suffolk, United Kingdom. She was on a voyage from Sunderland, County Durham to Nantes, Loire-Inférieure. She was refloated and put in to Lowestoft, Suffolk. |
| Therese | Kingdom of Hanover | The ship was wrecked on the Ossumerbalge. Her crew were rescued. She was on a voyage from Neuharlingersiel to Goole, Yorkshire, United Kingdom. |
| Wanderer | United Kingdom | The ship ran aground at and was severely damaged Newry, County Antrim. She was refloated and taken in to Warrenpoint, County Down. |

== 12 July ==
List of shipwrecks: 12 July 1853
| Ship | State | Description |
|---|---|---|
| Britain's Pride | United Kingdom | The ship ran aground on a reef north of Antigua. She was refloated and taken in to Antigua. |
| Poseidon | Norway | The ship was driven ashore in the Seine. She was on a voyage from Larvik to Rouen, Seine-Inférieure, France. She was refloated and taken in to Honfleur, Calvados. |
| Queen | United Kingdom | The brig ran aground on the Haisborough Sands, in the North Sea off the coast of Norfolk. She was refloated with assistance from the lugger Diadem (United Kingdom). |
| Sydney | United Kingdom | The ship was wrecked on a reef off Cannonier's Point, Mauritius. |
| Tom and Mary | (United Kingdom of Great Britain and Ireland) Jersey | The cutter was driven against the breakwater and severely damaged in St. Mary's Bay. |
| William | United Kingdom | The smack sank in the Bristol Channel off Steep Holm with the loss of all four people on board. She was on a voyage from Newport, Monmouthshire to Bridgwater, Somerset. |

== 13 July ==
List of shipwrecks: 13 July 1853
| Ship | State | Description |
|---|---|---|
| Factor | United Kingdom | The ship was driven ashore at the Sand Head, Hampshire. She was on a voyage from Weymouth, Dorset to London. |
| Spring | United Kingdom | The ship ran aground on the Herd Sand, in the North Sea off the coast of County Durham. She was refloated. |

== 14 July ==
List of shipwrecks: 14 July 1853
| Ship | State | Description |
|---|---|---|
| Alexandria | United Kingdom | The brig was driven ashore at Hartlepool, County Durham. Her crew were rescued. She was refloated on 19 July and taken in to Hartlepool. |
| Boyne | United Kingdom | The schooner ran aground on the Corton Sand, in the North Sea off the coast of Suffolk. She was refloated and assisted in to Lowestoft, Suffolk. |
| Countess of Strathmore | United Kingdom | The collier foundered in the North Sea off Whitby, Yorkshire with the loss of three of the eighteen people on board. Survivors were rescued by Bounty and/or the Yorkshire Billyboy Sisters (both United Kingdom). Countess of Strathmore was on a voyage from the River Tyne to London. |
| Cybele | United Kingdom | The ship was driven ashore and severely damaged near St. Andrews, Fife. Her crew were rescued. |
| Dido | United Kingdom | The brig ran aground off Great Yarmouth, Norfolk and was damaged. She consequently put in to Lowestoft. |
| Elizabeth | United Kingdom | The ship caught fire when her cargo of quicklime got wet. She was on a voyage from Sunderland to Arbroath, Forfarshire. She arrived at Arbroath on 16 July and the fire was extinguished. |
| Emerald | United Kingdom | The ship ran aground on the Docking Sand, in the North Sea off the coast of Norfolk. She was on a voyage from Hartlepool to London. She was refloated and put in to Great Yarmouth in a leaky condition. |
| Fawn | United Kingdom | The coaster was driven ashore at Seaham, County Durham. She was refloated on 22 July and taken in to Seaham in a severely damaged condition. She consequently sank. |
| Halcyon | Hamburg | The brig capsized off Hartlepool and was abandoned by the nine people on board. They were rescued by the brig Falcon (United Kingdom). Halcyon was on a voyage from Hamburg to Hartlepool. |
| Ida | United Kingdom | The coaster was driven ashore south of Seaham. |
| Ino | United Kingdom | The schooner sank off Dunbar, Lothian with the loss of all hands. |
| Jane Sinclair | United Kingdom | The coaster was driven ashore and wrecked at Seaham. Her crew were rescued. |
| Jean | United Kingdom | The ship sprang a leak and put in to Hartlepool, where she sank. She was on a voyage from Seaham to Whitstable, Kent. |
| Lord Glenelg | United Kingdom | The ship was driven ashore near "Sand le Mer", Yorkshire. |
| Margaret | United Kingdom | The ship was driven ashore near "Sand le Mer". |
| Pehr Ennes | Norway | The ship was abandoned in the Atlantic Ocean. Her crew were rescued by Parthenia (United Kingdom). Pehr Ennes was on a voyage from London, United Kingdom to Quebec City, Province of Canada, British North America. |
| Prince Albert | United Kingdom | The schooner capsized in the River Thames at Deptford, Kent with the loss of two lives. |
| Richmond | United Kingdom | The sailing barge ran aground on the Buxey Sand, in the North sea off the coast of Essex and was abandoned. She was on a voyage from London to Harwich, Essex. She was refloated and taken in to Harwich. |
| Rose | United Kingdom | The brig was driven ashore at Sea Palling, Norfolk. Her crew were rescued. She was on a voyage from Middlesbrough, Yorkshire to London. She was refloated on 17 July and taken in to Great Yarmouth. |
| Royal Frederick | United Kingdom | The ketch ran aground on the Kentish Knock and sank. Her crew were rescued by the brig William Gault (United Kingdom). Royal Frederick was on a voyage from Sunderland, County Durham to Plymouth, Devon. |
| Sisters | United Kingdom | The sloop was driven ashore at Sunderland with the loss of one of her three crew. She was on a voyage from Whitby to Newcastle upon Tyne, Northumberland. Sisters was refloated on 18 July and taken in to Hartlepool. |
| St. Gildas | France | The coaster, a lugger, was driven ashore and wrecked at Seaham. |
| Wave | United Kingdom | The coaster was driven ashore at Seaham. |

== 15 July ==
List of shipwrecks: 15 July 1853
| Ship | State | Description |
|---|---|---|
| Cuba | United Kingdom | The barque was abandoned off Cape Recife, Cape Colony by all but three of her crew, having previously ran aground at the cape and floated off. City of Calcutta and Kirkman Finlay (both United Kingdom) were the rescuing ships. |
| HCS Mozuffer | Royal Indian Navy | The frigate was wrecked 11 nautical miles (20 km) east of the mouth of the Rangoon River. Her crew were rescued by HCS Zenobia ( Royal Indian Navy). |
| Planet | United Kingdom | The ship was struck rocks off Little Head, Isle of Man. She was on a voyage from Ardrossan, Ayrshire to Preston, Lancashire. She was taken in to Douglas, Isle of Man in a leaky condition. |
| Tory | United Kingdom | The barque was driven ashore and wrecked 7 nautical miles (13 km) from Port Stephens, New South Wales. All on board were subsequently rescued by HMS Acheron (Royal Navy). Tory was on a voyage from London to Port Stephens. The wreck was burnt in August to salvage ironwork. |
| Triton | (United Kingdom of Great Britain and Ireland) Van Diemen's Land | The ship departed from Launceston for Melbourne, Victoria. No further trace, presumed foundered with the loss of all hands. |

== 16 July ==
List of shipwrecks: 16 July 1853
| Ship | State | Description |
|---|---|---|
| Empire | United States | struck by the General Livingston (some accounts refer to the "Chancellor Livingston"), on the Hudson not far north of where she was sunk several years before. |
| Mary | United Kingdom | The ship was driven ashore and sank at Broad Haven, Pembrokeshire. She was on a voyage from Whitehaven, Cumberland to Newport, Monmouthshire. |

== 17 July ==
List of shipwrecks: 17 July 1853
| Ship | State | Description |
|---|---|---|
| Harry King | United Kingdom | The ship was driven ashore at Whitstable, Kent. She was refloated. |
| Mary | United Kingdom | The ship sank at Broad Haven, Pembrokeshire. |
| Souverain | France | The chasse-marée sank off Selsey, Sussex, United Kingdom. Her crew were rescued. She was on a voyage from Havre de Grâce Seine-Inférieure to Cherbourg, Manche. |

== 18 July ==
List of shipwrecks: 18 July 1853
| Ship | State | Description |
|---|---|---|
| Banshee | United Kingdom | The ship was wrecked on a reef off Mindoro, Spanish East Indies. She was on a voyage from China to Sydney, New South Wales. |
| Diana | United Kingdom | The ship was wrecked on Prince Edward Island. She was on a voyage from Richibucto, New Brunswick, British North America to Hull, Yorkshire. |
| Etoile de Matin | (flag) France | The ship ran aground on the Newcombe Sand, in the North Sea off the coast of Suffolk, United Kingdom. She was on a voyage from Sunderland, County Durham, United Kingdom to Bordeaux, Gironde. She was refloated and taken in to Lowestoft, Suffolk in a severely leaky condition. |
| Planet | United States | The schooner was driven ashore, capsized and sank at Arrowsic, Maine. She was on a voyage from Prince Edward Island, British North America to Bath, Maine. |
| Sweepstakes | United States | The clipper capsized on being launched. She was righted on 21 July. Subsequently repaired and put in to service. |

== 19 July ==
List of shipwrecks: 19 July 1853
| Ship | State | Description |
|---|---|---|
| Tweed | United Kingdom | The brig was driven ashore on the coast of Nova Scotia, British North America. She was on a voyage from Sydney, Nova Scotia to New York United States. She was refloated and beached at Owls Head, Nova Scotia, where she sank. |
| William | United Kingdom | The sloop foundered in the Bristol Channel with the loss of all four people on board. She was on a voyage from Newport, Monmouthshire to Bridgwater, Somerset. |

== 20 July ==
List of shipwrecks: 20 July 1853
| Ship | State | Description |
|---|---|---|
| Liverpool | United States | The ship ran aground on a reef in the Bering Strait. She was consequently condemned. |
| Mary | United Kingdom | The ship ran aground in Jack Sound and sank off Broad Haven, Pembrokeshire. Her crew were rescued. |
| Sarah Jane | United Kingdom | The pilot vessel was wrecked near Pwlldu Bay, Glamorgan. Her crew survived. |

== 21 July ==
List of shipwrecks: 21 July 1853
| Ship | State | Description |
|---|---|---|
| Eastern Packet | (United Kingdom of Great Britain and Ireland) British North America | The ship was driven ashore at Cape Hogan, Nova Scotia. She was refloated at taken in to Arichat, Nova Scotia in a severely leaky condition and placed under repair. |
| Janet Smith | United Kingdom | The sloop was holed by her anchor and sank at Hartlepool, County Durham. She was on a voyage from Burntisland, Fife to Hartlepool. |
| Mary Taylor | United Kingdom | The ship foundered in the Atlantic Ocean 80 nautical miles (150 km) south west of Porto, Portugal. Her crew were rescued. She was on a voyage from Alexandria, Egypt to Falmouth, Cornwall. |
| United | United Kingdom | The ship ran aground at Melbourne Victoria. She was on a voyage from Liverpool, Lancashire to Melbourne. She was refloated on 22 August. |

== 22 July ==
List of shipwrecks: 22 July 1853
| Ship | State | Description |
|---|---|---|
| Lady Evelyn | United Kingdom | The ship was driven ashore and wrecked in the Majecosima Islands with the loss of 241 of the 277 people on board. She was on a voyage from Hong Kong to San Francisco, California, United States. |
| Pearl | United Kingdom | The ship was driven ashore on North Uist, Outer Hebrides. Her crew were rescued. She was on a voyage from Limerick to Arkhangelsk, Russia. She was refloated on 10 August and subsequently resumed her voyage. |
| Tavistock | United Kingdom | The ship ran aground on the Foreness Rock, Margate, Kent. She was on a voyage from Portsmouth, Hampshire. She was refloated. |

== 23 July ==
List of shipwrecks: 23 July 1853
| Ship | State | Description |
|---|---|---|
| Alfred | United Kingdom | The ship was wrecked on Saaremaa, Russia. She was on a voyage from Newcastle upon Tyne, Northumberland to Kronstadt, Russia. |
| George IV | United Kingdom | The schooner foundered in the North Sea off the Kentish Knock. Her crew were rescued by the schooner Catherine (United Kingdom). George IV was on a voyage from Sunderland, County Durham to Gibraltar. |
| Marion | United Kingdom | The ship was wrecked on rocks 3 nautical miles (5.6 km) west of the Savage Lighthouse, Burma. |

== 24 July ==
List of shipwrecks: 24 July 1853
| Ship | State | Description |
|---|---|---|
| Branscombe | United Kingdom | The ship was driven ashore at Littlehampton, Sussex. She was on a voyage from London to Sydney, New South Wales. She was refloated and resumed her voyage. |
| Francis Barclay | United Kingdom | The ship was driven ashore at Manila, Spanish East Indies. She was refloated on 1 September and was repaired. |
| Little Pet | United Kingdom | The ship ran aground on the Margate Sand, off the coast of Kent. She was on a voyage from London to Melbourne, Victoria. She was refloated. |
| Normal | (United Kingdom of Great Britain and Ireland) British North America | The ship was driven ashore and wrecked at Mistaken Point, Newfoundland. Her crew were rescued. She was on a voyage from Sydney, Nova Scotia to Saint John, New Brunswick. |

== 25 July ==
List of shipwrecks: 25 July 1853
| Ship | State | Description |
|---|---|---|
| Commerce | United Kingdom | The ship ran aground at King's Lynn, Norfolk. |
| Freedom | (United Kingdom of Great Britain and Ireland) New South Wales | The schooner was driven ashore at Warrnambool, Victoria. |
| Gem | United Kingdom | The ship ran aground at King's Lynn. She was refloated. |
| Juniata | United States | The ship ran aground on the Alacranes Reef. She was on a voyage from Laguna to Kronstadt, Russia. She was later refloated. |
| Herald | United Kingdom | The ship ran aground at Queenstown, County Cork. She was on a voyage from Callao, Peru to London. She was refloated the next day and taken in to Queenstown. |
| Temiscouata | United Kingdom | The ship ran aground at King's Lynn. She was refloated. |

== 26 July ==
List of shipwrecks: 26 July 1853
| Ship | State | Description |
|---|---|---|
| Emperor | (United Kingdom of Great Britain and Ireland) British North America | The ship ran aground and was severely damaged at Point Jose Poire, 3 nautical miles (5.6 km) east of Portobelo. Her crew were rescued. She was on a voyage from New York, United States to British Honduras. |
| Lady Berridale | United Kingdom | The steamship was in collision with a schooner south of Whitby, Yorkshire and was beached. She was on a voyage from Sunderland, County Durham to London. She was refloated and taken in to Whitby. |
| Mary | United Kingdom | The ship ran aground on the Mille Vaches Shoal. She was on a voyage from South Shields, County Durham to Quebec City, Province of Canada, British North America. She was consequently condemned. |
| Melbourne | (United Kingdom of Great Britain and Ireland) British North America | The ship was wrecked near Anticosti Island, Province of Canada. She was on a voyage from Quebec city to Liverpool, Lancashire. |

== 27 July ==
List of shipwrecks: 27 July 1853
| Ship | State | Description |
|---|---|---|
| Agathe | Prussia | The galeas sprang a leak and was abandoned in the North Sea. Her crew were rescued by Activ (Norway). Agathe was on a voyage from Kiel to Newcastle upon Tyne, Northumberland, United Kingdom. She came ashore at "Kliem", Denmark on 29 July. |
| Bittern | (United Kingdom of Great Britain and Ireland) Victoria | The schooner ran aground on the Long Reef, in Broken Bay. |
| Edward Cordwell | United Kingdom | The ship was wrecked on Miquelon. Her crew were rescued. She was on a voyage from Miramichi, New Brunswick, British North America to Liverpool, Lancashire. |
| Friedland | French Navy | The Océan-class ship of the line ran aground off the Rabbit Islands, Ottoman Empire. She was later refloated. |
| Grasshopper | United Kingdom | The brig struck the Whitby Rock. She was refloated. |
| Star | United Kingdom | The paddle steamer was in collision with the lighter Barclay (United Kingdom) and was beached in the River Clyde at Milton, Dunbartonshire. She was later refloated. |

== 28 July ==
List of shipwrecks: 28 July 1853
| Ship | State | Description |
|---|---|---|
| England | United Kingdom | The ship was driven ashore on the coast of Massachusetts, United States. She was on a voyage from Tralee, County Kerry to New York, United States. She was refloated on 30 July and towed in to New York. |
| Guide | United States | The schooner was wrecked on Cape Sable Island, Nova Scotia, British North America. She was on a voyage from New York to Labrador, British North America. |
| Jeune Poltais | France | The ship was destroyed by fire in the Mediterranean Sea 30 nautical miles (56 km) off Alexandria, Egypt. Her crew were rescued. She was on a voyage from Alexandria to Dunkirk, Nord. |
| St. James | (United Kingdom of Great Britain and Ireland) Jamaica | The ship was wrecked on a reef off Falmouth, Jamaica. She was on a voyage from Oracabessa to Falmouth. |
| Susan | (United Kingdom of Great Britain and Ireland) Victoria | The coaster was wrecked 8 nautical miles (15 km) south of the mouth of the Shoalhaven River. |
| Zeno | United Kingdom | The ship was driven ashore on Cape Breton Island, Nova Scotia, British North America. She was on a voyage from the Clyde to New York, United States. |
| Zenobia | United Kingdom | The ship was destroyed by fire in St. Ann's Bay, Jamaica. |

== 29 July ==
List of shipwrecks: 29 July 1853
| Ship | State | Description |
|---|---|---|
| Agathe | Flag unknown | The derelict galeas was driven ashore at "Kliem", Denmark. |
| Cape Horn | United Kingdom | The barque ran aground between the Bird Rock and White Buoy, off the coast of New South Wales. |
| President | (United Kingdom of Great Britain and Ireland) New South Wales | The ship was driven ashore on Garden Island. |

== 30 July ==
List of shipwrecks: 30 July 1853
| Ship | State | Description |
|---|---|---|
| Aurora | United Kingdom | The barque ran aground at Sunderland, County Durham. She was on a voyage from Sierra Leone to Sunderland. She was refloated on 2 August. |
| Bellcarrig | United Kingdom | The ship was damaged by fire at Birkenhead, Cheshire. She was on a voyage from Birkenhead to Ceylon. |
| Chrysalis | United Kingdom | The ship ran aground on a reef south west of Mayotte. Her crew were rescued. She was on a voyage from London to Madras, India. |
| Isabella | United Kingdom | The ship was driven ashore and wrecked on Double Island. Six survivors were rescued. She was on a voyage from Akyab, Burma to Queenstown, County Cork. |
| Lady of the Isles | United Kingdom | The ship was driven ashore on Mainadeen Point, Nova Scotia, British North America. She was on a voyage from Prince Edward Island, British North America to Liverpool, Lancashire. She was refloated and taken in to Arichat, Nova Scotia. |
| Nora | United States | The brig was driven ashore and severely damaged at Musquash, New Brunswick, British North America. |

== Unknown date ==
List of shipwrecks: Unknown date in July 1853
| Ship | State | Description |
|---|---|---|
| Adelphi | United Kingdom | The ship ran aground on the Scroby Sands, Norfolk. She was on a voyage from Newcastle upon Tyne, Northumberland to London. She was refloated on 5 July and taken in to Great Yarmouth, Norfolk. |
| Atalanta | United Kingdom | The ship ran aground on Læsø, Denmark before 4 July. She was on a voyage from Danzig to an English port. She was refloated. |
| Augusta | United Kingdom | The ship ran aground in Waggerah Creek, Burma and was severely damaged. |
| Conquest | (United Kingdom of Great Britain and Ireland) British North America | The ship was driven ashore on the Sand Shoals, off Newfoundland. She was later refloated and taken in to Gaspé, Province of Canada, where she arrived on 27 July. |
| Countess of Sheffield | United Kingdom | The ship was driven ashore near Woosung, China. She was on a voyage from London to Shanghai, China. She was refloated on 8 July and taken in to Shanghai. |
| Diadem | United Kingdom | The ship ran aground on the Middle Ground and was damaged. |
| Gladiator | United Kingdom | The ship struck a sunken rock off the Cocos Islands. She was on a voyage from Akyab, Burma to Falmouth, Cornwall. She consequently put in to Moulmein, Burma. |
| Gold Hunter | United Kingdom | The barque was driven ashore and wrecked on Inagua, Bahamas. She was on a voyage from Saint Domingo to New York, United States. |
| HMS Inflexible | Royal Navy | The Bulldog-class sloop ran aground in the Dardanelles before 27 July. She was later refloated. |
| James Wright | United Kingdom | The ship was driven ashore at Liverpool, Lancashire. She was refloated on 23n July and taken in to Liverpool. |
| Jong Jen | Netherlands | The ship was lost off Kuressaare, Russia before 5 July. Her crew were rescued. She was on a voyage from Liverpool, Lancashire, United Kingdom to Kuressaare. |
| Lightning | (United Kingdom of Great Britain and Ireland) New South Wales | The schooner was driven ashore and wrecked at "Upola". |
| Margaret | (United Kingdom of Great Britain and Ireland) New South Wales | The ship was wrecked at "Murrimbula". Her crew were rescued. |
| Mary Imrie | United Kingdom | The barque sprang a leak and foundered in the Pacific Ocean south of the Chiloé Archipelago, Chile before 30 July. Her crew were rescued. She was on a voyage from Huasco, Chile to Swansea, Glamorgan. |
| Matilda | United Kingdom | The schooner was driven ashore on the Ilha de Itamaracá, Brazil before 21 July. She was later refloated and taken in to Pernambuco. |
| Nieves Martinez | Chile | The barque was wrecked at Ancud before 3 July. Her crew were rescued. |
| Panama | United States | The ship was driven ashore on Kiawah Island, South Carolina and subsequently destroyed by fire. She had sprung a leak whilst on a voyage from New York to Liverpool and had intended to put in to Charleston, South Carolina. |
| Robert Surcouf | France | The barque was abandoned off Cape Horn, Chile before 12 July. Her crew were rescued by the barque Acacia (United Kingdom). Robert Surcouf was on a voyage from Bordeaux, Gironde to San Francisco, California, United States. |
| Rosa | Flag unknown | The brig was wrecked on the coast of New South Wales. |
| Stettin | Prussia | The steamship was driven ashore in the Pentland Firth on or before 8 July. She was on a voyage from Königsberg to Liverpool. She was refloated and taken in to Aberdeen, United Kingdom for repairs. |
