= United States Post Office (Camden, Maine) =

- U.S. Post Office-Camden Main
- U.S. National Register of Historic Places
- U.S. Historic district – Contributing property
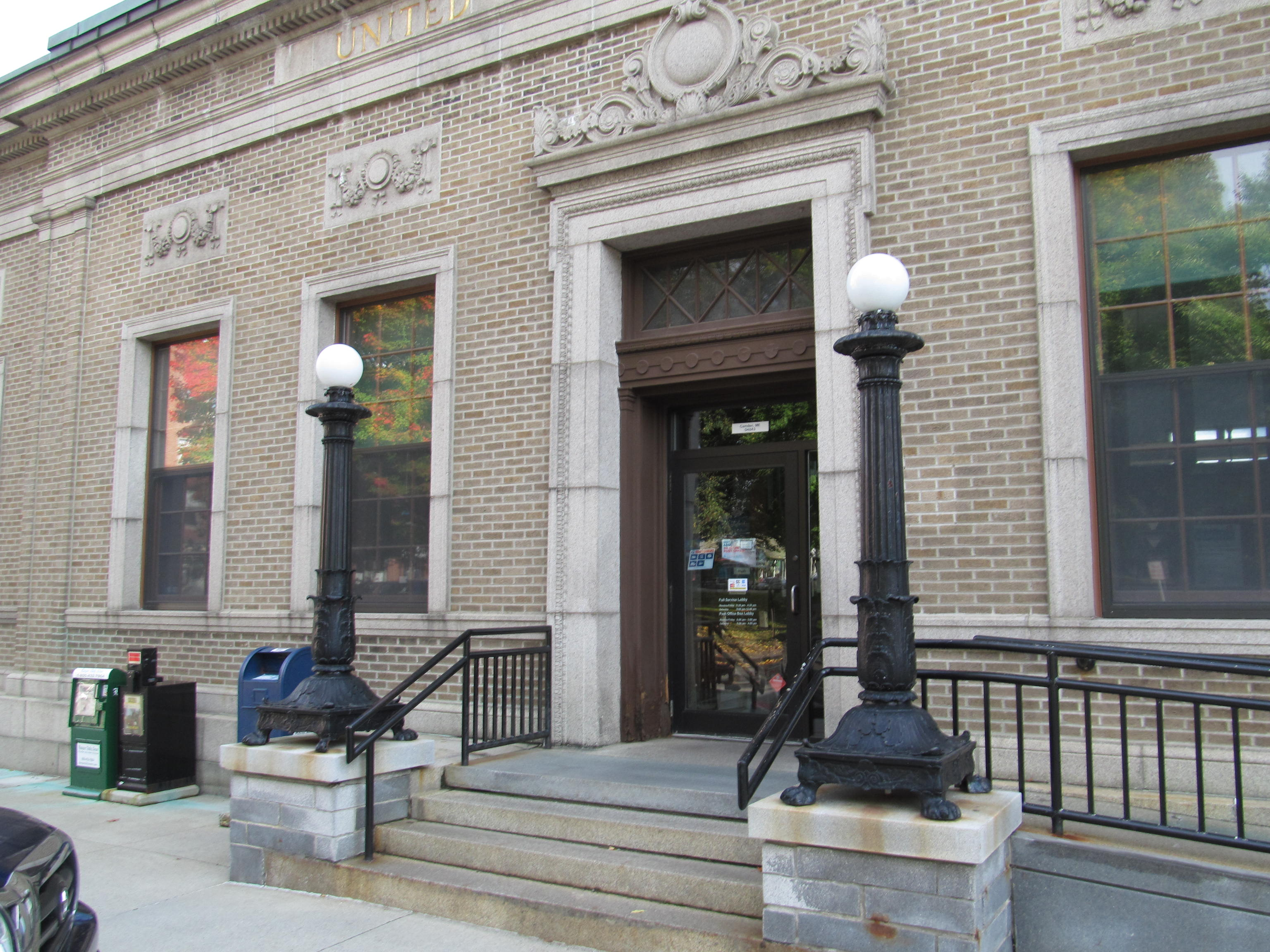

- Location within Maine
- Location: 28 Chestnut Street, Camden, Maine
- Coordinates: 44°12′31″N 69°3′53″W
- Area: 0.3 acres (0.12 ha)
- Built: 1913
- Architect: Oscar Wenderoth
- Architectural style: Beaux Arts, Renaissance
- Part of: Chestnut Street Historic District (ID91000325)
- NRHP reference No.: 86002960

Significant dates
- Added to NRHP: September 25, 1986
- Designated CP: March 22, 1991

The U.S. Post Office-Camden Main is the main post office of Camden, Maine. It is located at 28 Chestnut Street, in a Beaux Arts building designed by Oscar Wenderoth and completed in 1913. The building was listed on the National Register of Historic Places in 1986 for its architecture.

== Description and history ==
Camden's main post office is located at the southern end of its commercial downtown area, on the east side of Chestnut Street, with the town common across the street. It is a single-story masonry structure, built out of brick and granite. It has a low-pitch hip roof, with a projecting cornice. The front is seven bays wide, the center five projecting slightly, with pilasters at the corners of both the building and the projection. Windows are tall sash, set in granite-trimmed openings, with a decorative medallion above. The main entrance is at the center in a recess, with a series of low steps flanked by original iron globe lights. The interior public space has terrazzo marble flooring, plaster walls articulated by pilasters, and oak trim.

The Camden Post Office was one of 33 post office buildings constructed in 1913 by the federal government, pursuant to the provisions of the Tarsney Act and a 1912 appropriation by Congress. It was an early design of Oscar Wenderoth, who had in 1912 been appointed to the Office of the Supervising Architect of the United States Treasury Department. It is the town's only major example of Beaux Arts/Renaissance Revival architecture.

== See also ==
- National Register of Historic Places listings in Knox County, Maine
- List of United States post offices
