= Camden Public Library =

Public library in Maine, United States

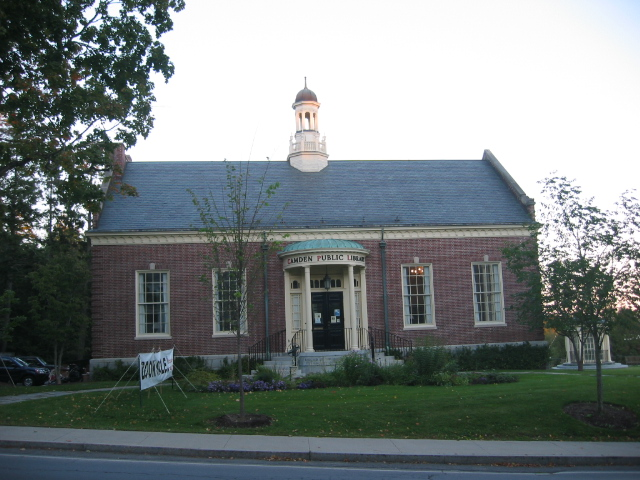
- Camden Public Library
- 44.211611°N 69.0645°W
- Location: 55 Main Street; Camden, Maine, U.S.
- Type: Public
- Established: July 11, 1928

Collection
- Size: 63,250

Access and use
- Circulation: 257,786
- Population served: 5,224

Other information
- Budget: $1,131,069
- Director: Kristy Kilfoyle
- Employees: 15
- Website: www.librarycamden.org
- Camden Amphitheater and Public Library
- U.S. National Register of Historic Places
- U.S. National Historic Landmark
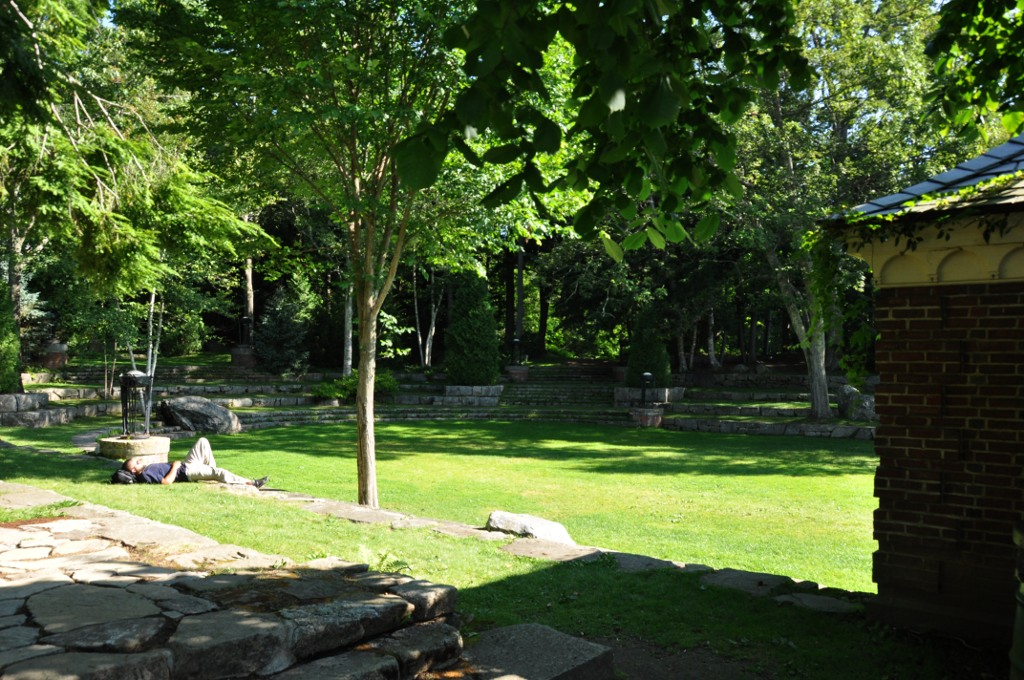
- The amphitheater, July 2013

- Location within Maine Location within the United States
- Location: 55 Main Street; Camden, Maine, U.S.
- Coordinates: 44.211611°N 69.064610°W
- Built: 1928
- NRHP reference No.: 13000285
- Added to NRHP: February 27, 2013

The Camden Public Library is the public library serving Camden, Maine, United States. It is a National Historic Landmark and is listed on the National Register of Historic Places.

== Description ==
The library is located at 55 Main Street on the north bank of the Megunticook River, on the north end of the Chestnut Street Historic District.

== History ==
The first library established in Camden was known as the Federal Society's Library and was started in 1796 with a collection of 200 books. At that time, Camden was a very small town consisting of 15 houses centered on the harbor. The Federal Society's Library operated for 34 years until the books were sold at auction.

In 1854, the Ladies’ Library Association opened on Wood Street. The library later moved to the second floor of the Camden National Bank building and remained at this location until the fire of 1892 that destroyed the Camden business district.

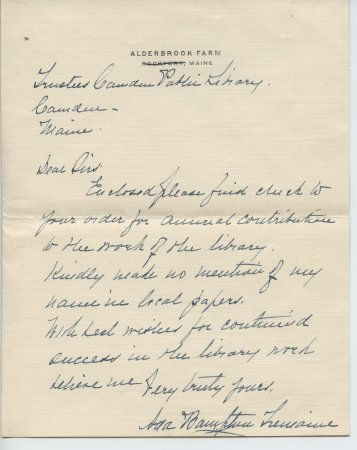
Letter from Ada Bampton Tremaine to the Trustees of the Camden Public Library

On March 23, 1896, the citizens of Camden voted to establish a free public library, which was to be known as the Camden Public Library. The townspeople of Camden raised the money to build this library through various local fundraising efforts. No assistance was provided by the philanthropist Andrew Carnegie. Mary Louise Curtis Bok donated the land for the library in 1916. Parker Morse Hooper and Boston architect Charles Greely Loring offered building plans. The cornerstone was laid on August 17, 1927 and the Library opened its doors on June 11, 1928 with Miss Katherine W. Harding serving as the first librarian.

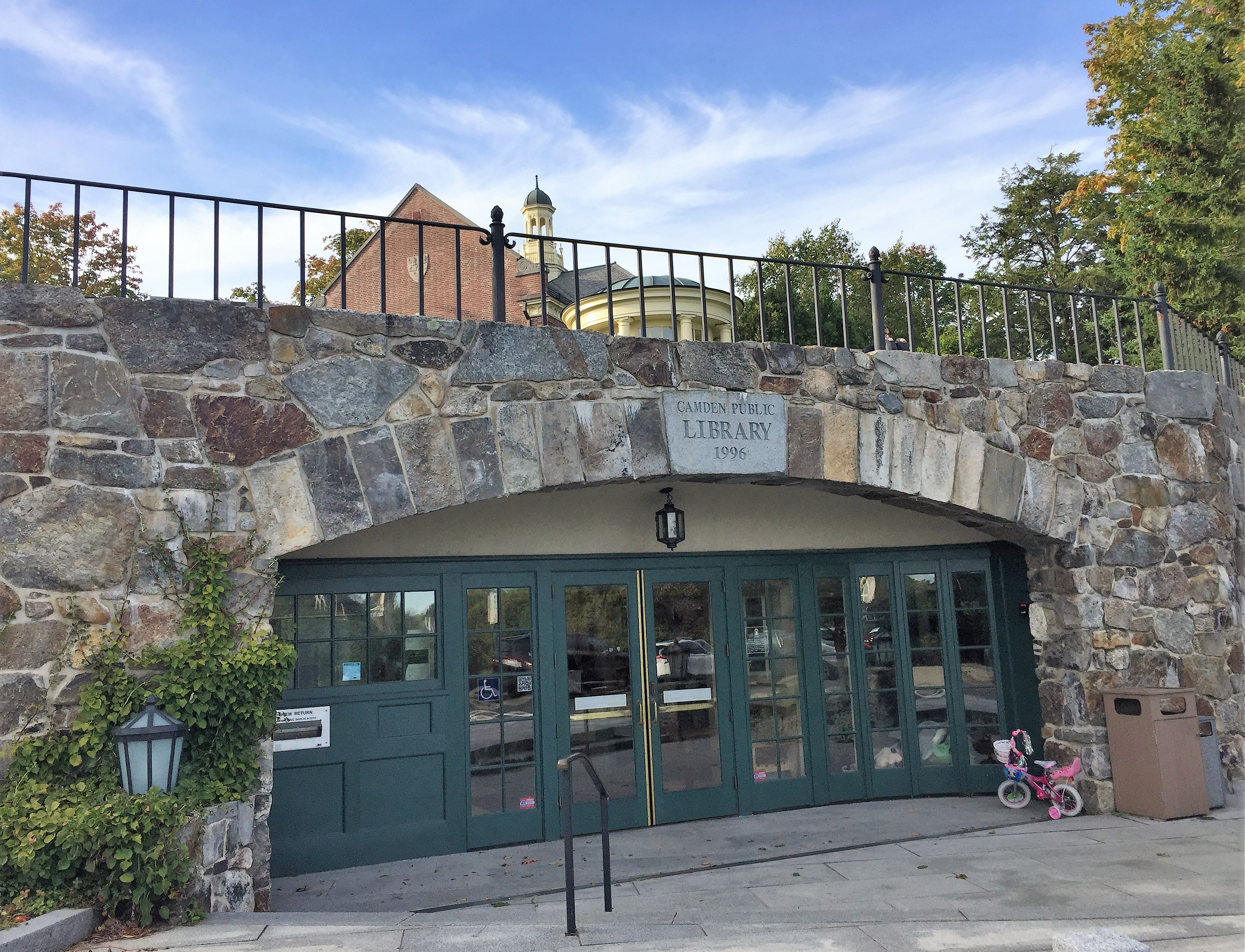
New, lower-level entrance to the library that was added in the 1990s, September 2018

In 1996, the library underwent a great expansion under the south lawn, where today 90% of the library's business is conducted. In 2001, Attorney Terry Calderwood clarified the role of the Library Board of Trustees over Harbor Park, noting that the by-laws of the Camden public Library set forth the power, authority and duty of the Board of Trustees to manage and control the Camden Public Library, the amphitheatre, Harbor Park, and all things connected therewith. The grounds of the library, including an amphitheatre, were designed by noted landscape architect Fletcher Steele. The library and its grounds were designated a National Historic Landmark on February 27, 2013, recognized as a rare public work by Steele, and as a forerunner of modern landscape design.

== See also ==
- List of National Historic Landmarks in Maine
- National Register of Historic Places listings in Knox County, Maine
