= Ada Bampton Tremaine =

American philanthropist (1849–1928)

- Born: Ada Byron Bampton; 21 June 1849; Poughkeepsie, New York
- Died: 6 August 1928 (aged 79); Rockland, Maine
- Occupation: Philanthropist
- Known for: Bampton Lectures in America

Ada Byron Bampton Tremaine (21 June 1849 (Note: There is a lack of clarity as to Ada Bampton Tremaine's birth date and birth year. During the hearing in which her cousin Frederick Bampton's will was contested (see above), Tremaine herself claimed to be born on 21 June 1850, but depositions by those who were in attendance at her birth give her birthdate as 24 June 1849. Whether 21 or 24 June, the year of her birth is indisputably 1849, despite confusion some 50 years later by Frederick's friends as to whether her birth had been in 1849 or 1850: Ada's father Richard Lane Bampton left for the California Gold Rush in January 1849; witnesses to her birth place that event in the summer of 1849, a few weeks after the sinking of the SS Empire on 17 May 1849; and Ada is listed in the 1850 census taken on 13 August as being a year old.) – 6 August 1928) was an American philanthropist best known for the bequest that established the Bampton Lectures in America as well as an endowed chair (the Ada Byron Bampton Tremaine Professor of Religion) within the Department of Religion at Columbia University. That chair is currently held by Courtney Bender. Her predecessor, Robert Somerville, upon his retirement on 1 July 2020 was given the honorary title of Tremaine Professor Emeritus of Religion.

== Biography ==
Ada Byron Bampton was born in Poughkeepsie, New York, on either 21 or 24 June 1849 to Elizabeth Shepherd Bampton, (Note: As is so often the case with the details of Ada Bampton Tremaine's life, her mother's maiden name is reported in the newspaper accounts of the court tussle over Frederick Bampton's will as "Sheffield", but Elizabeth and Richard Lane Bampton's marriage record on 11 February 1830 in Birmingham, England, lists her last name as "Shepherd".) who spent the last few months of her pregnancy and first few months as a new mother residing with a friend, Hannah North.

Ada's father Richard Lane Bampton, a spermaceti chandler originally from Little Sutton, Warwickshire, had left for the California Gold Rush on 25 January 1849 on one of the first schooners to depart New York City for San Francisco, the Roe, which made the journey in 154 days. He arrived in San Francisco on 28 June 1849, only a few days after Ada was born. Richard remained in California until his death on 23 June 1889 in what then was known as Washington in Yolo County, California. Ada never met her father, and it is unclear whether he ever knew of her existence. Instead, Ada grew up in Manhattan and Brooklyn, living with her mother and her cousin Frederick Bampton, with whom she was particularly close, calling him her uncle even to her husband.

In the late 1870s and early 1880s Ada studied engraving at Cooper Union under the direction of J. P. Davis. After the death of her mother on 4 May 1881, Ada went to live with Frederick and his new wife, Martha. On 3 October 1888 in Manhattan she married Dr. William Allen Tremaine, the son of a Connecticut hotelier, a physician practicing in Providence, Rhode Island. Their only child, Frederick Bampton Tremaine, was born in Providence on 6 February 1890; he died eleven months later, on 12 January 1891, of unspecified causes. In the early 1900s William and Ada Tremaine moved from Providence to Rockport, Maine, where they bought a farm in Rockland called Alderbrook; Ada would live here for the rest of her life. On 5 October 1913 Dr. Tremaine died of throat cancer in Boston, where he had gone for treatment.

Ada Bampton Tremaine died in Rockland on 6 August 1928, at the age of 79. She is buried in Woodlawn Cemetery.

=== Court Challenge to Frederick Bampton's Will ===
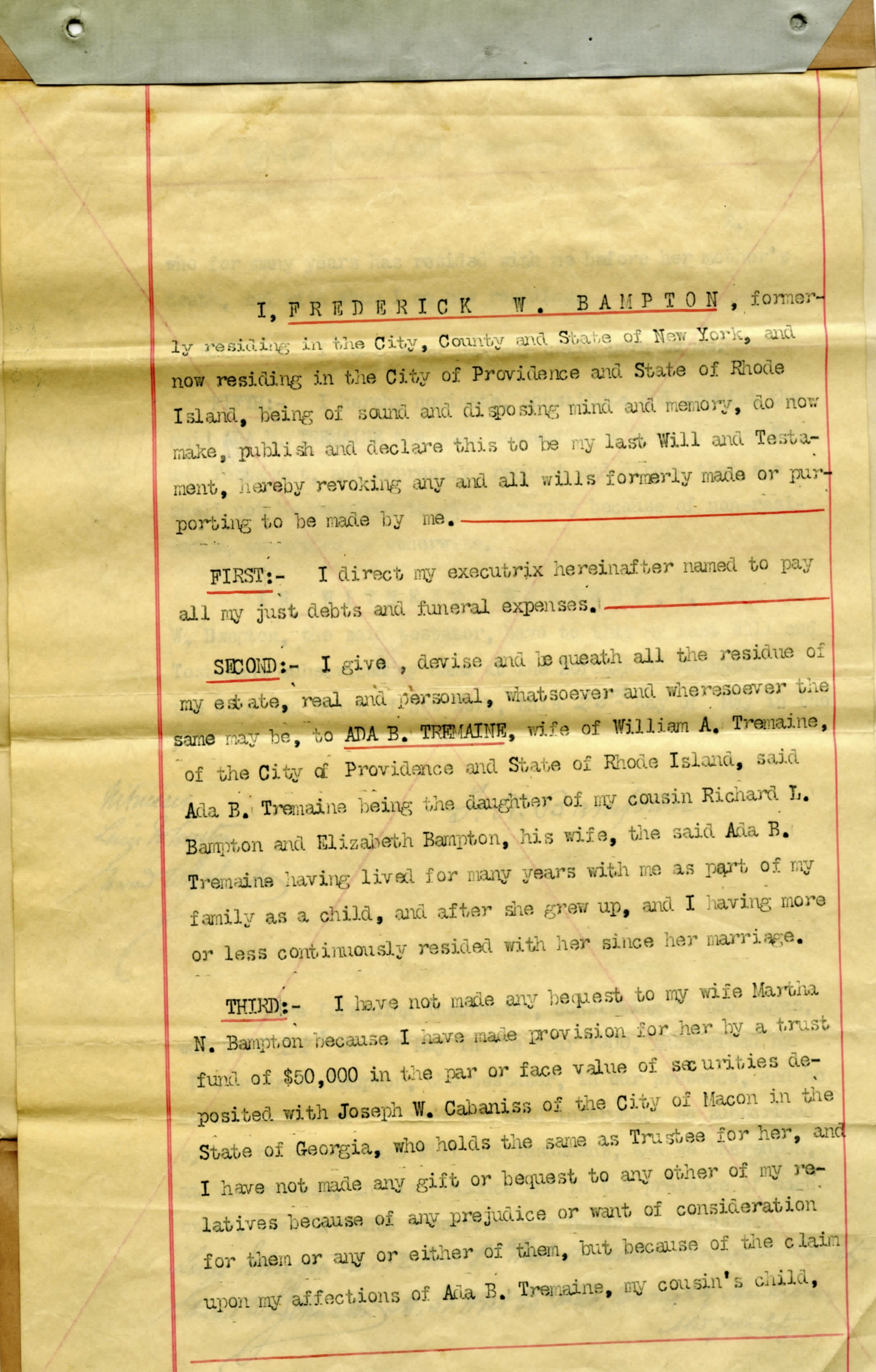
First page of the last will and testament of Frederick W. Bampton

Most of what is known about Ada Bampton Tremaine's life comes from the records of a court case that arose from a dispute over the terms of her cousin Frederick Bampton's will, in which upon his death on 10 October 1900 he left his entire estate to her, as well as naming her sole executrix. Frederick, who had begun suffering from bouts of dementia, had been living with Ada and William Tremaine for over a year. His marriage of nearly 20 years to Martha Scott North (Note: Frederick Bampton and Martha Scott North met when they were living in the same apartment building in Manhattan. When they married on 23 February 1881 in Mattie's hometown of Macon, Georgia, Frederick was 57; Mattie, 22.) had long been an unhappy one. When Frederick drew up his will on 22 May 1900 he deliberately wrote his wife out of the will, stipulating, "I have not made any bequest to my wife Martha N. Bampton because I have made provision for her by a trust fund of $50,000 [approximately $1.7 million in 2021] in the par or face value of securities." He also did not leave any bequest to any other relatives other than Ada, "not ... because of any prejudice or want of consideration for them ... but because of the claim upon my affections of Ada B. Tremaine, my cousin's child, (Note: It is unclear exactly how Richard Lane Bampton and Frederick W. Bampton are related, but there is no reason to doubt Frederick's assertion that they were cousins, as was backed up by his friends' depositions, despite Frederick's widow's insistence otherwise. They were both born in Warwickshire, Richard in Little Sutton and Frederick in Solihull. According to the depositions of Eliza Bradbrook and her daughter Georgiana given in support of Ada's claim to Frederick's estate, Frederick, Richard, and Elizabeth were on very friendly terms during the 1840s when they all lived in Manhattan and both Frederick and Richard had insisted at that time that they were cousins.) who for many years resided with me before her mother's death, and with whom I am now residing." The children of Frederick's nephew John Henry Bampton, Jr., (Note: Jack Bampton's father (John Henry Bampton, Sr.) and Frederick were brothers. At the time of his death on 19 October 1900 Jack was, like Frederick, living in Providence. It is perhaps Jack and his family that Frederick had in mind when he observed in his will that they might think they had a claim on his estate, but that affection was more important than close blood ties.) who had died in Providence only nine days after Frederick, joined Frederick's widow in contesting the will.

Throughout the course of the court hearing, both attorneys for the contestants and the widow Mattie Bampton herself questioned Ada's parentage, the nature of her relationship with Frederick and whether she had undue influence over him, and Frederick's lucidity at the time he drew up his will. The many days of testimony across several months in 1901 and compelling depositions by witnesses to Ada's birth and by friends of Frederick's who knew Richard Lane Bampton and Elizabeth Bampton convinced the judge that Frederick was of sound mind when he made his will and that Ada should in fact be the sole inheritor of Frederick's estate, which had been appraised at $150,000 (approximately $4.9 million dollars in 2021).

== Philanthropy ==
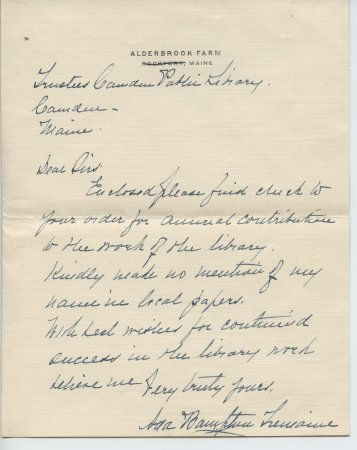
Letter to the Trustees of the Camden Public Library

In the 15 years after her husband William's death in 1913 until her own in 1928, Ada Bampton Tremaine supported a number of organizations, in particular giving generously to the Rhode Island Hospital, where she established a deficiency fund in the name of her late husband and endowed four permanent "free beds" at $4000 each (roughly $55,000 each in 2021 dollars) in memory of her mother, her husband, her cousin Frederick, and her son, making the final payment on those in 1924. (Free bed funds are specific donations that a hospital receives to provide free care to patients who cannot pay for all or part of their hospital stay.) She was also seemingly an annual contributor to the Camden Public Library, which also received a bequest in her will.

Ada's will, drawn up in Rockport on 26 January 1916 and witnessed by three local businessmen, spelled out a number of public bequests in addition to private gifts and trust funds provided to her friends, family, and long-time employees:

- Rockport received $5000 to be used for the construction of a library.
- Camden, Maine, likewise received $5000 for the same purpose, although by the time her will was probated, the newly built Camden Public Library had already been open for two months.
- The American Society for the Prevention of Cruelty to Animals received $1000.
- The Camden Home for Aged Women likewise received $1000.
- A miniature of George III by Sarah Biffin Wright and a manuscript on her life were to be offered to the Metropolitan Museum of Art "if said Museum of Art will accept the same."
- She provided $20,000 for the upkeep of Alderbrook Farm until the death of her husband William's cousin Grace Rockwell (Note: The unmarried Grace Rockwell, who had long struggled with depression, committed suicide in Cambridge, Massachusetts, on 10 May 1926. Ada did not update her will, however, so her trust bequest to Grace for $10,000 was reported in the local Camden paper as if Grace were still alive.) and Ada's sister-in-law Elizabeth Tremaine Field, (Note: Elizabeth Rockwell Tremaine Field, also known as Mrs. Charles H. Field, was one of two older sisters of William Tremaine and was a long-time friend of Ada's. Born 22 July 1851 in Valatie, New York, Lizzie, as she was known by family and friends, lived to be 89, dying at her home in Hartford, Connecticut on 28 May 1941.) when the farm was to revert to the Knox County General Hospital.

=== The Bampton Lectures in America ===
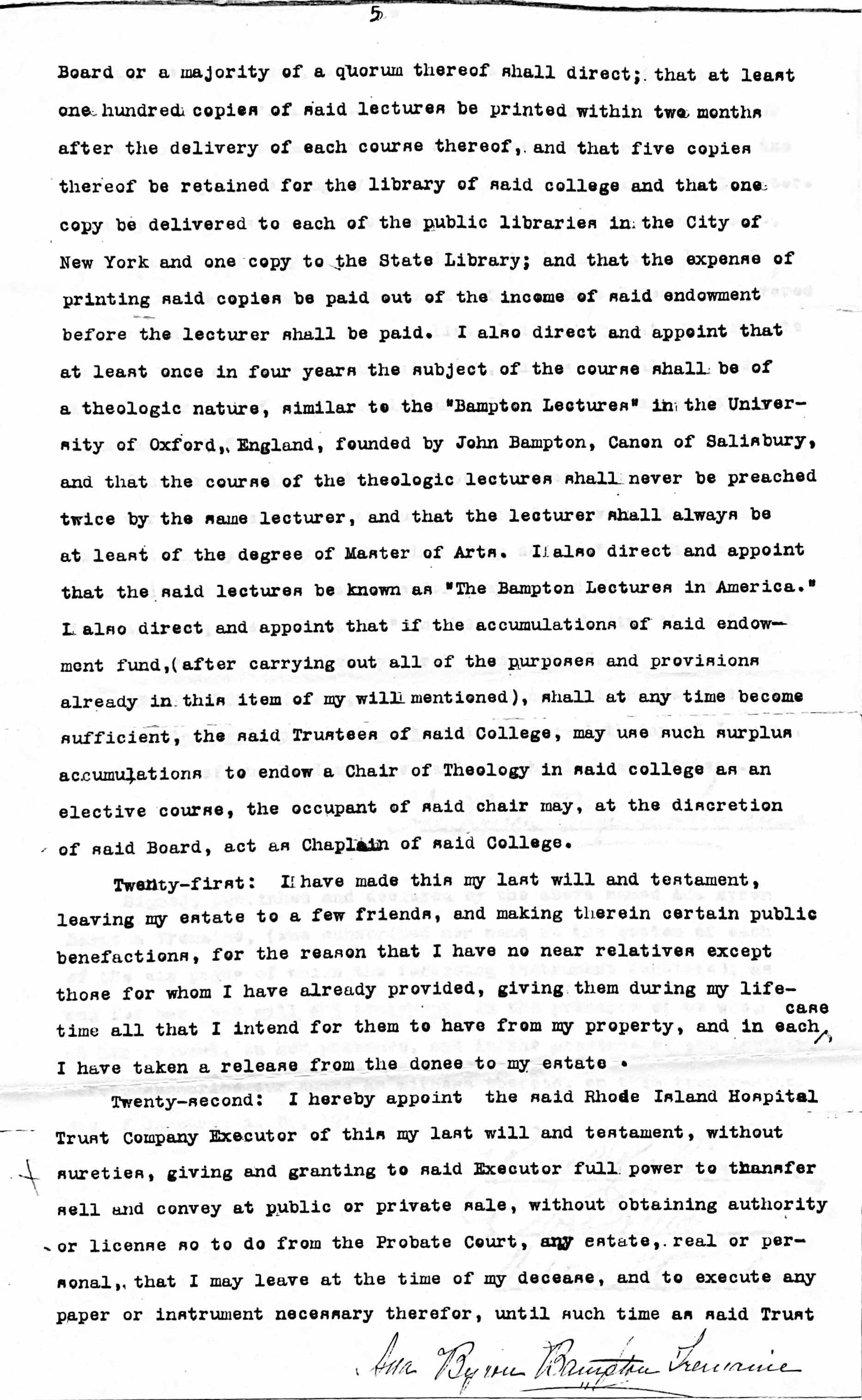
Page 5 of Ada Bampton Tremaine's will, in which she establishes the Bampton Lectures in America.

Once the other trust funds had been fulfilled, which happened in 1941 upon the death of Ada's sister-in-law Elizabeth Tremaine Field, as specified in Ada Bampton Tremaine's will, the balance of the trust was to go to Columbia College, where Ada's husband William Tremaine had studied. The trust funds were to be used for the establishment of a lecture series entitled the Bampton Lectures in America (Note: Despite the occasional reporting as fact the fanciful notion that Ada Bampton Tremaine was descended from the John Bampton who founded the original Bampton Lectures at Oxford University, including that claim being made in the Columbia University Libraries' finding aid record for the Lectures, there is no evidence that these two Bampton families were related. Ada herself makes no such claim, merely observing that she wishes "that at least once in four years the subject of the [Bampton Lectures in America] course shall be of a theologic nature, similar to the 'Bampton Lectures' in the University of Oxford, England, founded by John Bampton, Canon of Salisbury.") and for an endowed chair in theology — "an endowment large enough to guarantee the holding of the Bampton lectures in perpetuity," it was noted when the first lecturer, Arnold J. Toynbee, was invited to speak.

Ada Bampton Tremaine's estate was one of the largest probated in Knox County up to that time, being assessed at $725,000 (almost $11 million in 2021), of which $610,000 (approximately $9.5 million in 2021 dollars) was earmarked for the Bampton Lectures at Columbia University. Columbia, however, needed to wait for more than a decade to receive these funds, which could not be paid out until the final trust fund was fulfilled. That final bequest seems to have been handled posthaste by the Rhode Island Hospital Trust Company, the executors of Ada's estate, as in the 1942 annual report to the Columbia trustees, President Nicholas Murray Butler announced that the university had finally received their funds from the estate of Ada B. B. Tremaine, totaling $649,781.31 ($11,025,911.83 in 2021 dollars). Six years later Toynbee gave the first set of Bampton Lectures, three talks grouped under the theme of "The Prospect of the Western Civilization," presented at Columbia's McMillin Theater on 14 April 1948 ("The Problem of War"), 19 April 1948 ("The Problem of Class"), and 21 April 1948 ("The Conflict Between Heart and Head").

== See also ==
- American Society for the Prevention of Cruelty to Animals
- Bampton Lectures in America
- Camden Public Library
- Columbia University
- Metropolitan Museum of Art
- Rhode Island Hospital
