= Trias =

Trias or Trías may refer to:

- Triassic, a geologic period
- Germanic Trias, a sequence of rock strata
- Bulbophyllum sect. Trias, a section in the orchid genus Bulbophyllum
- Trias politica, Latin for separation of powers
- Trias, a keelboat sailing regatta craft

== People ==
- Eugenio Trías Sagnier (1942–2013), Spanish philosopher
- Jasmine Trias (born 1986), American singer-entertainer
- Jordi Trias (born 1980), Spanish professional basketball player
- Jorge Trías (1948–2022), Spanish politician
- Manuel Trías (born 1998), Venezuelan footballer
- Mariano Trías (1868–1914), Filipino politician
- Robert Trias (1923–1989), American karate pioneer
- Xavier Trias (Xavier Trias i Vidal de Llobatera, born 1946), Spanish politician

== Places ==
- General Trias, a city in the Philippines

== Entertainment ==
- Trias (game), a dinosaur-themed board game

== See also ==
- Tria (disambiguation)
- Triad (disambiguation)
- Triplet (disambiguation)
- Troika (disambiguation)
- 3 (disambiguation)
