= Man's Right to Knowledge =

1954 radio show on CBS

Man's Right to Knowledge was a radio program that ran from January 3, 1954 to December 26, 1954 on CBS. Created by Columbia University on the occasion of its bicentennial, the show consisted of two weekly lecture series, each episode featuring a different prominent academic or world leader. The university's president, Grayson L. Kirk, hosted the series. The content of each lecture centered around the university's bicentennial theme, "Man's Right to Knowledge and the Free Use Thereof". The first series, titled Man's Right to Knowledge: Tradition and Change, ran for thirteen weeks beginning on January 3. The second, titled Man's Right to Knowledge: Present Knowledge and Future Directions, ran for another thirteen weeks beginning on October 3. The final lecture, delivered by J. Robert Oppenheimer in his first public appearance since the end of his security hearings earlier that year, marked the official end of the Bicentennial.

The show was wildly successful—within three months of the show's debut, the university had already received 10,000 requests for reprints of the talks; its episodes were eventually transcribed and published in two volumes. By September 1954, the book version of the first series had sold over 22,000 copies. The series was translated and rebroadcast across the world, and won a 1954 Peabody Award for its "unprecedented impact", and the way it "stimulated a crusade for free inquiry and free expression—and helped to give to millions of individuals a deeper understanding of their rights to knowledge."

== Episodes ==
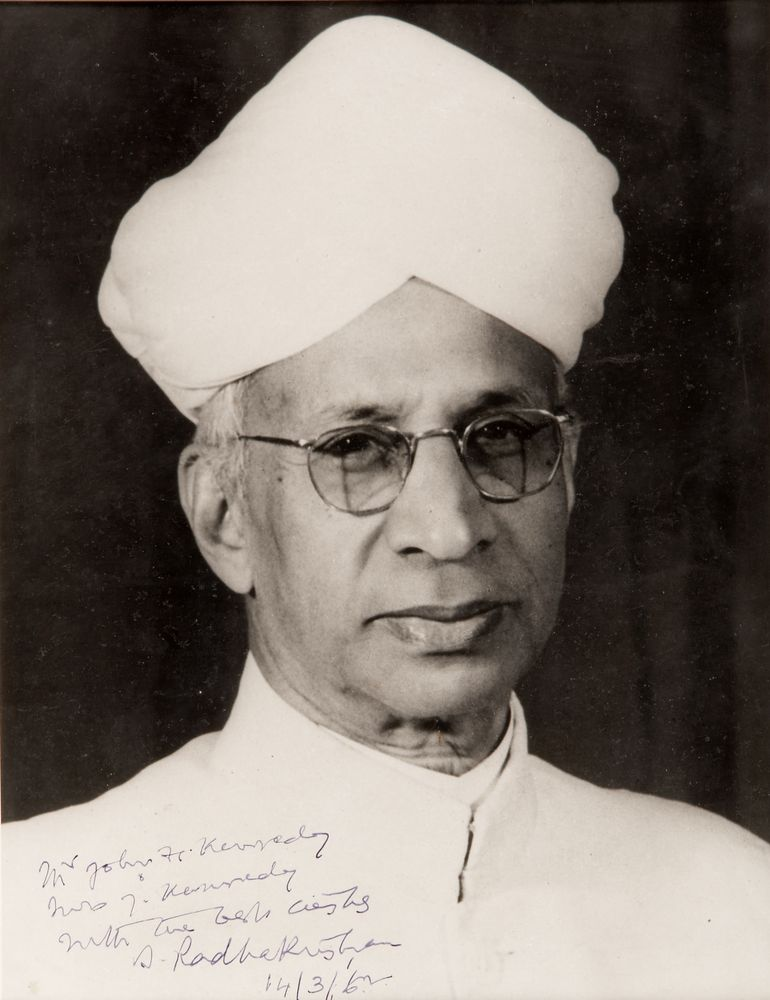
Sarvepalli Radhakrishnan

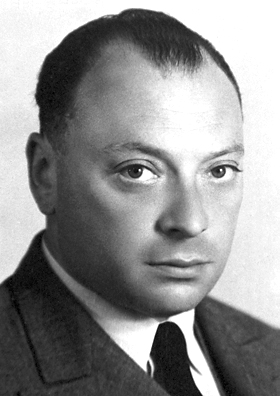
Wolfgang Pauli

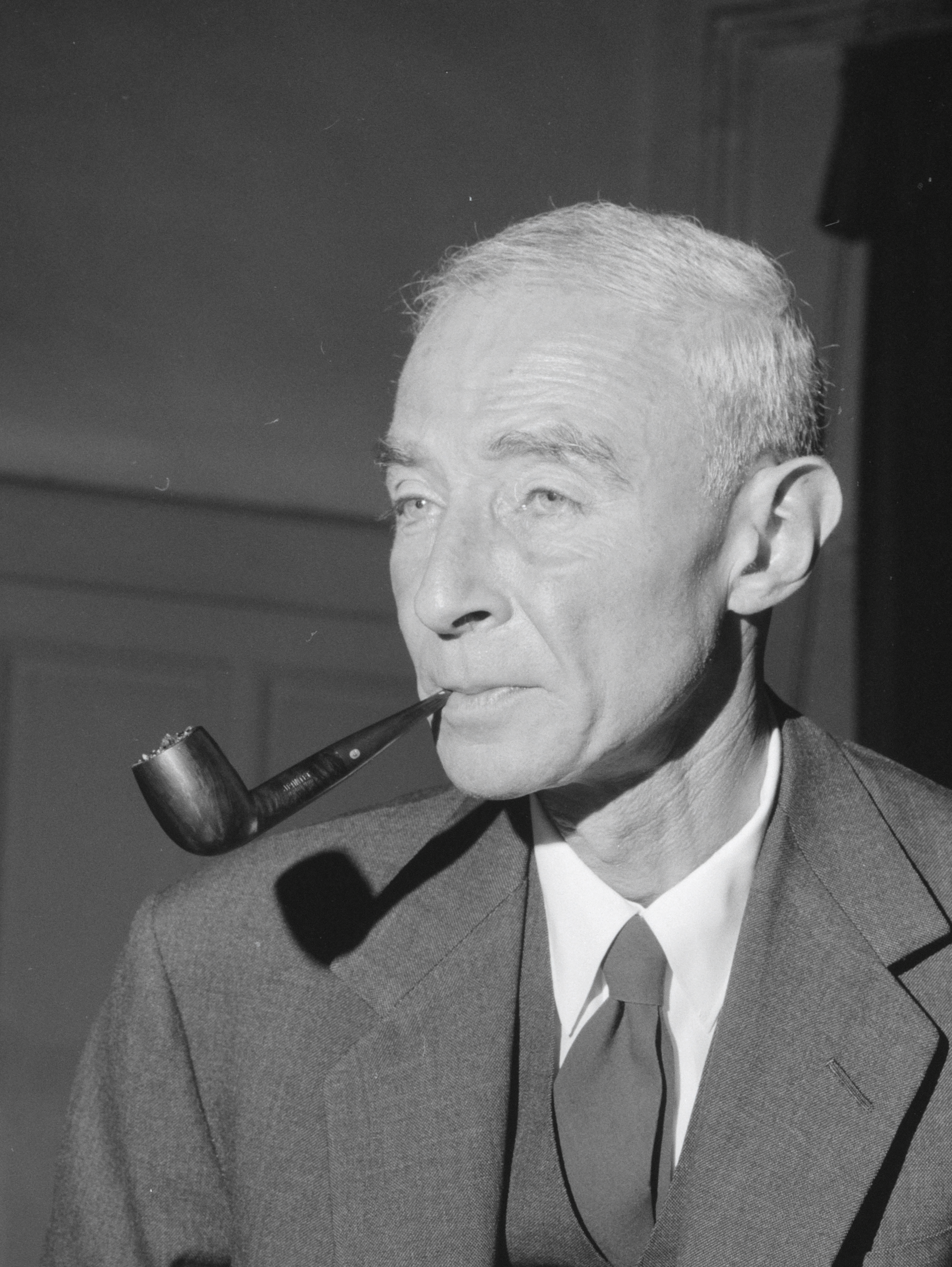
J. Robert Oppenheimer

=== Man's Right to Knowledge: Tradition and Change ===
#	Lecturer	Subtopic	Title	Original air date
1	Arnold J. Toynbee	"The Idea of Man"	"The Ancient Mediterranean View of Man"	January 3, 1954
2	Sarvepalli Radhakrishnan	"The Idea of Man"	"The Ancient Asian View of Man"	January 10, 1954
3	William F. Albright	"The Idea of Man"	"The Judeo-Christian View of Man"	January 17, 1954
4	Joseph Wood Krutch	"The Idea of Man"	"The Modern View of Man"	January 24, 1954
5	William Linn Westermann	"The Idea of Society"	"Authority and Freedom in the Ancient Mediterranean World"	January 31, 1954
6	Hu Shih	"The Idea of Society"	"Authority and Freedom in the Ancient Asian World"	February 7, 1954
7	Martin D'Arcy	"The Idea of Society"	"Authority and Freedom in Medieval Europe"	February 14, 1954
8	Robert Morrison MacIver	"The Idea of Society"	"Authority and Freedom in the Modern World"	February 21, 1954
9	George Sarton	"The Idea of the Universe"	"The Old World and the New Humanism"	February 28, 1954
10	Swami Nikhilananda	"The Idea of the Universe"	"The Universe as Pure Being"	March 7, 1954
11	François Louis Ganshof	"The Idea of the Universe"	"Knowledge and Faith in Medieval Europe"	March 14, 1954
12	Homi J. Bhabha	"The Idea of the Universe"	"Inquiry and Reason Today"	March 21, 1954
13	Grayson L. Kirk	"The Idea of the University"	"The Idea of the University"	March 28, 1954

=== Man's Right to Knowledge: Present Knowledge and Future Directions ===
#	Lecturer	Subtopic	Title	Original air date
1	Howard P. Robertson	"The Nature of Things"	"The Nature of the Universe"	October 3, 1954
2	Wolfgang Pauli	"The Nature of Things"	"The Nature of Matter"	October 10, 1954
3	Hermann Joseph Muller	"The Nature of Things"	"The Nature of Life"	October 17, 1954
4	Henry Murray	"The Nature of Things"	"Versions of Man"	October 24, 1954
5	John Lord O'Brian	"Human Organization"	"Law and Freedom"	October 31, 1954
6	Jean Monnet	"Human Organization"	"Use of Resources"	November 7, 1954
6	Eli Ginzberg	"Human Organization"	"Human Potential"	November 7, 1954
7	Brock Chisholm	"Human Organization"	"Physical Well-Being"	November 14, 1954
8	Hans Speier	"Human Organization"	"War and Peace"	November 21, 1954
9	Paul Tillich	"The Human Spirit"	"Religion as an Aspect of the Human Spirit"	November 28, 1954
10	William George Constable	"The Human Spirit"	"Visual Arts as an Aspect of the Human Spirit"	December 5, 1954
11	Herbert Read	"The Human Spirit"	"Literature as an Aspect of the Human Spirit"	December 12, 1954
12	Aaron Copland	"The Human Spirit"	"Music as an Aspect of the Human Spirit"	December 19, 1954
13	J. Robert Oppenheimer	"Prospects in the Arts and Sciences"	"Prospects in the Arts and Sciences"	December 26, 1954

== See also ==
- Ernest Kempton Adams Lectures
- Bampton Lectures (Columbia University)
