= Tria =

Tria or TRIA may refer to:

== Places ==
- Tria (river), a tributary of the river Barcău in Romania
- Tria, a village in Derna, Bihor, Romania

== Other uses ==
- Tria (The Land Before Time), a character on The Land Before Time
- TRIA Rink, an ice hockey arena in Saint Paul, Minnesota, U.S.
- Transmit and receive integrated assembly, a part of a two-way satellite dish
- Terrorism Risk Insurance Act, a 2002 United States federal law
- Tria, a line of refillable pens by Letraset

== People with the surname ==
- Giovanni Tria (born 1948), Italian economist and politician
- Giovanni Andrea Tria (1676–1761), Italian bishop, diplomat and historian

== See also ==
- Tria juncto in uno, motto of the Order of the Bath
- Tria nomina, a Roman naming convention
- Trias (disambiguation)
