= Ernest Kempton Adams Lectures =

Series of physics lectures

The Ernest Kempton Adams (EKA) Lectures at Columbia University is a lecture series on physics that originally took place from 1905 to 1913. According to physicist Andrew Millis, the series "marked the beginning of America’s engagement with modern physics," and was the first and only occasion on which several leading European physicists visited or lectured in America. It was originally funded by Edward Dean Adams with a $50,000 endowment in memory of his son, Ernest Kempton Adams, who was an 1897 alumnus of Columbia’s School of Mines. The lecture series was founded by Professor George B. Pegram. The series was revived in 2022 with a lecture by Michael Berry.

== List of lectures ==
1905–06: Vilhelm Bjerknes, "Fields of Force"

1906–07: Hendrik Lorentz, "The Theory of Electrons and its Application to the Phenomena of Light and Radiant Heat"

1909: Max Planck, "Eight Lectures on Theoretical Physics"

1909–10: Carl Runge, "Graphical Methods"

1911: Jacques Hadamard, "Four Lectures on Mathematics"

1913: Robert W. Wood, "Researches in Physical Optics, Part I"

1913: Wilhelm Wien, "Neuere Probleme der theoretischen Physik"

2022: Michael Berry, "Four Geometric Optical Illusions"

== See also ==
- Bampton Lectures (Columbia University)
- Man's Right to Knowledge Lectures
