= Bampton Lectures (Columbia University) =

Lectures in America at Columbia University

Coordinates: 40°48′27.2″N 73°57′45.2″W

The Bampton Lectures in America are a recurring series of lectures at Columbia University established in 1948 by a bequest of Ada Byron Bampton Tremaine and modeled on the original Bampton Lectures at the University of Oxford in England. Either a series of lectures, or single lecture, is delivered in New York during the academic year by a prominent scholar on a topic of their choosing in the areas of theology, art, science, or medicine. In accordance with the wishes of Ms. Tremaine, the lectures are delivered to a general audience and subsequently published.

Originally an annual event, only 12 lectures were delivered between 1969 and 2007, with two each for the entirety of the 1970s and the 1990s. Since 2007 the lectures have been held on a biennial basis.

== List of lecturers and lectures ==
- (1) 1948 – Arnold J. Toynbee: The Prospect of the Western Civilization
- (2) 1949 – Paul R. Hawley: New Discoveries in Medicine: Their Effect on the Public Health
- (3) 1950 – C. H. Dodd: Gospel and Law: The Relation of Faith and Ethics in Early Christianity
- (4) 1951 – Lewis Mumford: Art and Technics
- (5) 1952 – James B. Conant: Modern Science and Modern Man
- (6) 1953 – Alan Gregg: Challenges to Contemporary Medicine
- (7) 1954 – John Baillie: The Idea of Revelation in Recent Thought
- (8) 1955 – Lionello Venturi: Four Steps Toward Modern Art: Giorgione, Caravaggio, Manet, Cézanne
- (9) 1956 – Joel H. Hildebrand: Science in the Making
- (10) 1957 – Brock Chisholm: Prescription for Survival: The Expanding Concept of Health
- (11) 1958 – Eric Lionel Mascall: The Importance of Being Human: Some Aspects of the Christian Doctrine of Man
- (12) 1959 – Anthony Blunt: The Art of William Blake
- (13) 1960 – Detlev Bronk: The Status of Science and Modern Society
- (14) 1961 – W. Barry Wood, Jr.: From Miasmas to Molecules
- (15) 1962 – Paul Tillich: Christianity and the Encounter of the World Religions
- (16) 1963 – Northrop Frye: A Natural Perspective: The Development of Shakespearean Comedy and Romance
- (17) 1964 – Fred Hoyle: Man in the Universe
- (18) 1965 – Robert Hanna Felix: Mental Illness: Progress and Prospects
- (19) 1966 – Alasdair C. MacIntyre: Fate of Theism/Atheism and Morals
- (20) 1966 – Paul Ricœur: On Interdiction and Accusation
- (21) 1968 – John Newenham Summerson: Victorian Architecture: Four Studies in Evaluation
- (22) 1969 – Jacob Bronowski: Magic, Science, and Civilization
- (23) 1975 – Paul Ramsey: Ethics at the Edges of Life: Medical and Legal Intersections
- (24) 1976 – Symposium on Titian: His World and His Legacy with David Rosand, James S. Ackerman, Juergen Schulz, Patricia H. Labalme, Douglas Lewis, Edward Lowinsky, and Julius S. Held
- (25) 1980 – Symposium on Bernini and the Baroque
- (26) 1982 – Anthony Kenny: Faith and Reason
- (27) 1983 – Steven Weinberg: On the Art of Science
- (28) 1984 – William Arrowsmith: Innovation and Tradition in Euripides
- (29) 1986 – Zellig Harris: Language and Information
- (30) 1987 – Peter Brown: Poverty and Power in the Later Roman Empire
- (31) 1988 – Robert Gallo: Old Plagues and New Pandemics: Microbe Hunting Revisited
- (32) 1990 – Annemarie Schimmel: Yusuf's Fragrant Shirt: Images in the Phenomenology of Islam
- (33) 1991 – James Cahill: The Painter's Practice: How Artists Lived and Worked in Traditional China
- (34) 2001 – Archbishop Demetrios: Saint John Chrysostom: Anthropological Insights for Our Time
- (35) 2007 – Jonathan Riley-Smith: The Crusades, Christianity, and Islam
- (36) 2009 – Irving Weissman: Speculations on Stem Cells and the Mind
- (37) 2011 – Wendy Freedman: A Runaway Universe: The Size and Age of the Universe
- (38) 2013 – Liam Gillick: Industry and Intelligence: Contemporary Art since 1820
- (39) 2015 – Daniel Boyarin: A Genealogy for Judaism
- (40) 2018 – Péter Erdő: The Role of Religion and the Churches in a Secular State
- (41) 2019 – Jennifer Doudna in conversation with Henry Greely: The Future of Genome Editing

== See also ==
- Ernest Kempton Adams Lectures
- Man's Right to Knowledge Lectures
