= Weinroth =

Weinroth is a surname. Notable people with the surname include:

- Jacob Weinroth (1947–2018), Israeli attorney
- James Weinroth (died 1957), American politician and lawyer

== See also ==
- Winroth
