= Robert Somerville =

Robert Eugene Somerville (born 1940) was, until his retirement, the Ada Byron Bampton Tremaine Professor of Religion and Professor of History at Columbia University, New York. Since July 1, 2020, he has been the Tremaine Professor Emeritus of Religion.

== Biography ==
Born in Pittsburgh, Pennsylvania in 1940, Somerville taught at Columbia from 1969 until his retirement, except for a year at the University of Pennsylvania (1976–1977).

Somerville did his doctoral work under Stephan Kuttner at Yale University. He has published widely on the high medieval history of the papacy and of canon law. He is internationally recognized as an authority on medieval church councils. With the publication of his 2011 book Pope Urban II's Council of Piacenza, he has published completely all the sources relating to the councils of Pope Urban II.

Somerville is a member of the American Academy of Arts and Sciences and a Fellow of the Medieval Academy of America and of the Commission internationale de diplomatique. He is a corresponding member of the Monumenta Germaniae Historica in Munich and of the Bavarian Academy of Sciences and Humanities. He has received numerous awards, including two John Simon Guggenheim Memorial Fellowships, in 1974 and 1987.

In 2012, the Catholic University of America Press published a Festschrift in his honor, Canon Law, Religion, and Politics: "Liber Amicorum" Robert Somerville, edited by his former students Uta-Renate Blumenthal, Anders Winroth, and Peter Landau.

He currently lives on the Upper West Side in Manhattan, New York. His son, Gregory Somerville, graduated in 2013 from Columbia College with a Bachelor of Arts in music.

== Books ==
- Somerville, Robert (1972). The Councils of Urban II. Vol. 1: Decreta Claromontensia. Amsterdam: Hakker. p. 175. OCLC 590112179.
- Somerville, Robert (2018) [1977]. Pope Alexander III and the Council of Tours (1163): A Study of Ecclesiastical Politics and Institutions in the Twelfth Century. Berkeley: University of California Press. p. 122. ISBN 9780520303126.
- Pennington, Kenneth; Somerville, Robert, eds. (1977). Law, Church, and Society: Essays in Honor of Stephen Kuttner. Philadelphia: University of Pennsylvania Press. p. 340. ISBN 9780812277265.
- Somerville, Robert, ed. (1982). Scotia Pontificia: Papal Letters to Scotland Before the Pontificate of Innocent III. Oxford: Oxford University Press. p. 260. ISBN 978-0198224334.
- Somerville, Robert (1990). Papacy, Councils and Canon Law in the 11th–12th Centuries. New York: Routledge. p. 377. ISBN 9780860782605.
- Somerville, Robert, ed. (1995). Paul Oskar Kristeller at Ninety, May 22–23, 1995. New York: Columbia University. "This pamphlet commemorates Columbia's award of the Nicholas Murray Butler Award in Gold."
- Somerville, Robert; Kuttner, Stephan (1996). Pope Urban II, the Collectio Britannica, and the Council of Melfi (1089). Oxford: Clarendon Press. p. 344. ISBN 9780198205692.
- Prefaces to Canon Law Books in Latin Christianity: Selected Translations, 500-1245. Translated by Somerville, Robert; Brasington, Bruce C. New Haven: Yale University Press. 1998. p. 256. ISBN 9780300071467.
- Kristeller, Paul Oskar (2008). Selig, Karl-Ludwig; Somerville, Robert (eds.). Florilegium Columbianum: Essays in Honor of Paul Oskar Kristeller. New York: Italica Press. p. 216. doi:10.2307/j.ctt1t88vpp. ISBN 9780934977487. JSTOR j.ctt1t88vpp.
- Somerville, Robert (2011). Pope Urban II's Council of Piacenza. Oxford: Oxford University Press. p. 300. ISBN 9780199258598.
