= Kenedy Có =

Guinea-Bissauan footballer

Personal information
- Full name: Kenedy Silva Có
- Date of birth: 30 November 1998 (age 27)
- Place of birth: Bissau, Guinea-Bissau
- Height: 1.90 m (6 ft 3 in)
- Position: Forward

Team information
- Current team: Vila Real

Youth career
- 2016: Nacional
- 2016–2017: Benfica

Senior career*
Years	Team	Apps	(Gls)
2017–2018	Sporting CP B	9	(0)
2018–2019	Pau	8	(0)
2018–2019	Pau B	16	(5)
2019–2020	Olímpico Montijo	15	(3)
2020	Sertanense	6	(0)
2020–2021	Mirandela	24	(6)
2021–2022	Espinho	18	(6)
2022–2023	Canelas	15	(1)
2023–2024	Camacha	20	(3)
2024	Coimbrões	3	(0)
2025	Rebordosa	16	(1)
2025	Camacha	7	(1)
2026–	Vila Real	6	(0)
- * Club domestic league appearances and goals as of 27 February 2026

Kenedy Silva Có (born 30 November 1998) is a Guinea-Bissauan professional footballer who plays as a forward for Campeonato de Portugal club Vila Real.

== Club career ==
On 20 August 2017, Có made his professional debut with Sporting B in a 2017–18 LigaPro match against Real.

Pau FC unveiled his signing on Facebook on 2 August 2018.

In January 2026, Có transferred to SC Vila Real.
