= Christopher Godet =

Bahamian footballer

Personal information
- Date of birth: 30 March 1998 (age 28)
- Place of birth: Nassau, Bahamas
- Height: 1.88 m (6 ft 2 in)
- Position: Defender

Team information
- Current team: Cubs FC

College career
Years	Team	Apps	(Gls)
2015–2016	Mount Aloysius Mounties	17	(0)

Senior career*
Years	Team	Apps	(Gls)
2014–	Cubs FC		

International career^{‡}
2015–	Bahamas	3	(0)
- * Club domestic league appearances and goals ‡ National team caps and goals as of 18 January 2019

Christopher Godet (born 30 March 1998) is a Bahamian footballer who plays for Cubs FC and the Bahamas national football team.

== International career ==
Godet made his senior international debut on 25 March 2015 in a 5–0 home defeat to Bermuda during World Cup qualification.

== Personal life ==
Godet is the son of Bahamas national football team coach Dion Godet. Godet is also a youth soccer referee and has a D-level coaching badge. In June 2015, Godet met Cristiano Ronaldo at the One & Only Ocean Club in The Bahamas.
