= Hans van der Zee =

Dutch football manager (born 1956)

Hans van der Zee (born 15 January 1956 in Amsterdam) is a Dutch soccer manager and scout. He was a manager of two clubs in the Netherlands on the highest level. From 1996 until 1997 he was manager of FC Volendam. From 1997 until 1999 he was manager of Sparta Rotterdam.

Nickname: "The scout of 100 million."

Van der Zee started as a football player who played in the Ajax youth academy for eight years, from 1966 until 1974. His player career came to end because of injuries.

From 1999 until 2001 Van der Zee was director of football at AZ Alkmaar. Then Van der Zee became an international scout for PSV Eindhoven from 2001 until 2007. In that time he worked close and successfully together with Guus Hiddink, manager of PSV at that time. In the time they worked together, PSV Eindhoven signed South-American top players like Alex, Gomes and Jefferson Farfán. In the six years Van der Zee worked as an international scout for PSV Eindhoven the club won the Dutch title four times: 2003, 2005, 2006 and 2007.

In 2006 Van der Zee joined Hiddink and worked for the Australia national football team during World Cup in Germany. Van der Zee made team reports on the opponents of Australia.

In July 2007, he became the international scout for Ajax.

February 2009 Van der Zee was mentioned in English newspapers as the new chief scout of Chelsea.

On 30 December 2009 the Dutch football magazine Voetbal International reports that PSV-manager Fred Rutten has asked Van der Zee to return to PSV as a scout. According to the magazine Ajax did not want to let their international scout leave the club.

From 2010 to 2012 Van der Zee was the chief scout of Ajax. In 2011, 2012, 2013, 2014, 2019, 2020, 2021 and 2022 Ajax won the Dutch league eight times with Van der Zee as an international scout.

In the summer of 2016 Ajax signed Davinson Sanchez from Atletico Nacional. Ajax paid 5 million euros for the Colombian centre back. After one year Davinson Sanchez went to Tottenham Hotspur that paid 42 million euros as a transfer fee.

In February 2017 De Telegraaf, the biggest Dutch daily newspaper, revealed that Hans van der Zee was the discoverer of David Neres. The biggest South American signing in Ajax history. 12 million euros Ajax paid for the winger of São Paulo.

In February 2020 Ajax signed Antony from FC São Paulo. Transfer fee 16 million euros. Hans van der Zee scouted Antony in Brazil.

August 2022 Manchester United signed Antony for the amount of 100 million euros. A new record in Dutch football.

Marc Overmars, Football director of Ajax from 2012 until 2022, gave Van der Zee the nickname "the 100 million man".
