= Victor Paraíba =

Brazilian footballer

Personal information
- Full name: Victor Wesley dos Santos da Silva
- Date of birth: 21 April 1998 (age 28)
- Place of birth: Campina Grande, Brazil
- Height: 1.79 m (5 ft 10 in)
- Position: Attacking midfielder

Team information
- Current team: Portuguesa-RJ

Youth career
- Sport Recife
- 2018: CSA

Senior career*
Years	Team	Apps	(Gls)
2018–2021	CSA	29	(2)
2019	→ Atlético Goianiense (loan)	5	(0)
2021	Atlético Goianiense	8	(0)
2021	Ferroviária	6	(2)
2022–	Portuguesa-RJ	3	(0)
- * Club domestic league appearances and goals as of 13:28, 4 March 2022 (UTC)

Victor Wesley dos Santos da Silva (born 21 April 1998), known as Victor Paraíba, is a Brazilian footballer who plays as an attacking midfielder for Portuguesa-RJ.

== Club career ==
Born in Campina Grande, Paraíba, Victor Paraíba joined CSA's youth setup in 2018, from Sport Recife. He made his first team debut on 1 September 2018, coming on as a second-half substitute for Daniel Costa in a 0–3 Série B away loss against Boa Esporte.

Victor Paraíba scored his first senior goal on 17 March 2019, netting the equalizer in a 1–1 away draw against Coruripe for the Campeonato Alagoano championship. He made his Série A debut on 5 May, replacing Naldo in a 0–0 home draw against Santos.

On 10 May 2019, Victor Paraíba renewed his contract until 2023. On 17 September, he was loaned to Atlético Goianiense for the remainder of the 2019 Série B.

Back at CSA for the 2020 campaign, Victor Paraíba was sparingly used by the club, and terminating his contract on 10 February 2021; he immediately returned to Atlético Goianiense.

== Career statistics ==
As of 28 April 2021

Club	Season	League			State League		Cup		Continental		Other		Total	
Club	Season	Division	Apps	Goals	Apps	Goals	Apps	Goals	Apps	Goals	Apps	Goals	Apps	Goals
CSA	2018	Série B	1	0	0	0	0	0	—		0	0	0	0
CSA	2019	Série A	9	0	9	2	0	0	—		4 (Note: Appearance(s) in Copa do Nordeste)	1	22	3
CSA	2020	Série B	9	0	1	0	0	0	—		3	1	13	1
CSA	2021	Série B	0	0	0	0	0	0	—		2	0	2	0
CSA	Total		19	0	10	2	0	0	—		9	2	38	4
Atlético Goianiense (loan)	2019	Série B	5	0	—		—		—		—		5	0
Atlético Goianiense	2021	Série A	0	0	8	0	0	0	0	0	0	0	8	0
Ferroviária	2021	Série D	6	2	—		—		—		—		6	2
Portuguesa-RJ	2022	Série D	0	0	3	0	0	0	—		—		3	0
Career total			30	2	21	2	0	0	0	0	9	2	60	6
