= Conner Blöte =

Dutch footballer (born 1998)

Personal information
- Date of birth: 17 January 1998 (age 28)
- Place of birth: Nieuwegein, Netherlands
- Height: 1.71 m (5 ft 7 in)
- Position: Left back

Team information
- Current team: SV Houten

Youth career
- –2007: SV Geinoord
- 2007–2017: Ajax

Senior career*
Years	Team	Apps	(Gls)
2017–2018	Jong Utrecht	7	(0)
2018–2020	USV Hercules	29	(1)
2020–2022	SO Soest		
2022–2024	VV Maarssen		
2024–2025	WNC		
2025–	SV Houten		

International career
2015–2016	Netherlands U18	3	(0)
- * Club domestic league appearances and goals as of 15 December 2024

Conner Blöte (born 17 January 1998) is a Dutch footballer who plays as a left back for SV Houten in the 6th-tier Eerste Klasse.

== Club career ==
He made his Eerste Divisie debut for Jong FC Utrecht on 25 August 2017 in a game against FC Dordrecht, coming on as a substitute in the 80th minute for Tim Brinkman. In May 2018, Blöte signed a contract with Utrecht-based club USV Hercules. In 2019, he completed a trial at Finnish club SJK, but decided to stay in the Netherlands. In 2020, he moved to amateur club SO Soest competing in the seventh tier of Dutch football league system.
