= Chestnut Street Historic District (Kingston, New York) =

Historic district in New York, United States

- U.S. National Register of Historic Places
- U.S. Historic district
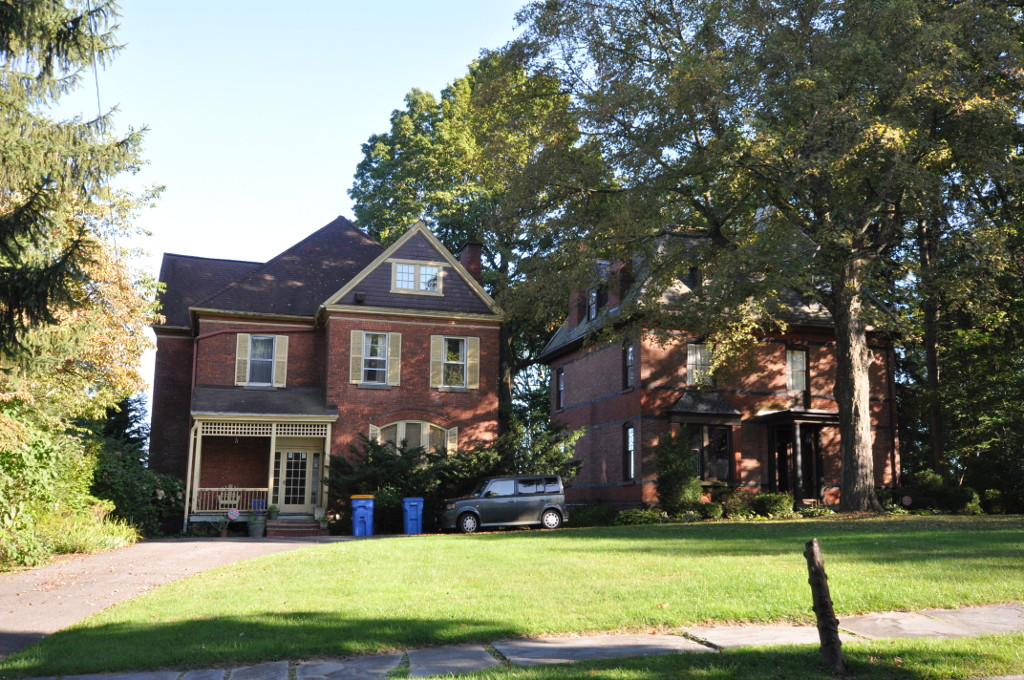

- Location within New York Location within the United States
- Location: Roughly bounded by W. Chestnut St., Broadway, E. Chestnut, Livingston & Stuyvesant Sts., Kingston, New York
- Coordinates: 41°55′24″N 73°59′22″W
- Area: 22 acres (8.9 ha)
- Architect: McCullough, Hugh; Multiple
- Architectural style: Mid 19th Century Revival, Late 19th And 20th Century Revivals, Late Victorian
- NRHP reference No.: 85002443
- Added to NRHP: September 19, 1985

Chestnut Street Historic District is a national historic district located at Kingston in Ulster County, New York. The district includes 44 contributing buildings and six contributing structures. It comprises a collection of substantial 19th and early 20th century residences on dramatic hillside sites. It also includes the Immanuel Lutheran Church and Bruck Funeral Home.

It was listed on the National Register of Historic Places in 1985.
