= Hanna Lundell =

Swedish footballer

Personal information
- Full name: Hanna Lundell
- Date of birth: 6 July 1998 (age 28)
- Place of birth: Sweden
- Positions: Left winger; forward

Team information
- Current team: IK Uppsala
- Number: 23

Senior career*
| Years | Team | Apps | (Gls) |
| 2015–2016 | FC Rosengård | 16 | (0) |
| 2017–2019 | IK Uppsala | | |
| 2020 | Trelleborgs FF | | |
| 2020 | Kvarnsvedens IK | | |
| 2021 | Borgeby FK | | |
| 2022 | Södra Sandby IF | | |
| 2023 | Ifö Bromölla IF | | |
| 2024– | Helsingborgs IF | | |

International career^{‡}
| 2015 | Sweden U17 | 3 | (0) |
- * Club domestic league appearances and goals as of 10 September 2015 ‡ National team caps and goals as of 16 April 2015

Hanna Lundell (born 6 July 1998) is a Swedish footballer who plays as a forward.

In 2020 she went down to Trelleborgs FF in Division 1, but halfway through the year she was recruited by Kvarnsvedens IK in Elitettan.

She was later a prolific goalscorer in Division 1 again, lastly for Södra Sandby IF with 28 goals in 19 matches, before returning to Elitettan with Ifö Bromölla IF. Following 11 goals in the 2023 season, she signed for Helsingborgs IF. Having lost the entire 2024 season to knee injury, she extended her contract into 2025 and 2026.

== Honours ==
Rosengård

Winner

- Damallsvenskan: 2015

Runner-up

- Svenska Cupen: 2014–15
