= John Håkansson =

Swedish footballer

Personal information
- Full name: John Carl Erik Håkansson
- Date of birth: 28 March 1998 (age 28)
- Place of birth: Sweden
- Height: 1.88 m (6 ft 2 in)
- Position: Goalkeeper

Youth career
- –2011: Lindås BK
- 2012–2016: Kalmar FF

Senior career*
Years	Team	Apps	(Gls)
2014–2018	Kalmar FF	1	(0)
2017	→ Husqvarna FF (loan)	5	(0)
2018	→ Åtvidabergs FF (loan)	10	(0)

International career
2013–2015	Sweden U17	8	(0)
2015–2016	Sweden U19	2	(0)
- * Club domestic league appearances and goals as of 25 February 2019

John Håkansson (born 28 March 1998) is a Swedish footballer who most recently played for Kalmar FF.

== Career ==
On 21 September 2014, when first-choice goalkeeper Ole Söderberg was suspended and second-choice goalkeeper Lars Cramer was sick, Håkansson broke a 79-year-old record when he became the youngest goalkeeper ever to play in Allsvenskan with 16 years, 5 months and 24 days when he played against Djurgårdens IF. He also became the first player born 1998 to play in Allsvenskan. However, Håkansson conceded 4 goals and Kalmar FF lost 4–0.
