= Mohamed Abukar =

Somali footballer (born 1998)

Personal information
- Full name: Mohamed Abubakar Mohamed
- Date of birth: 10 January 1998 (age 28)
- Position: Midfielder

Senior career*
Years	Team	Apps	(Gls)
- Walton Casuals
2019	Banstead Athletic	9	(1)
2019	Northwood	1	(0)
2020	Brightlingsea Regent	2	(0)

International career^{‡}
2019	Somalia	3	(0)
- * Club domestic league appearances and goals as of 8 April 2021 ‡ National team caps and goals as of 1 March 2026

Mohamed Abubakar Mohamed (born 10 January 1998) is a Somali footballer who plays as a midfielder for the Somalia national football team.

== Club career ==
In February 2020, after spells at Walton Casuals, Banstead Athletic and Northwood, Abukar signed for Isthmian League club Brightlingsea Regent.

== International career ==
On 5 September 2019, Mohamed made his debut for Somalia in a 1–0 win against Zimbabwe. The win marked Somalia's first ever FIFA World Cup qualification victory.
