= Maximilian Schuster =

German footballer

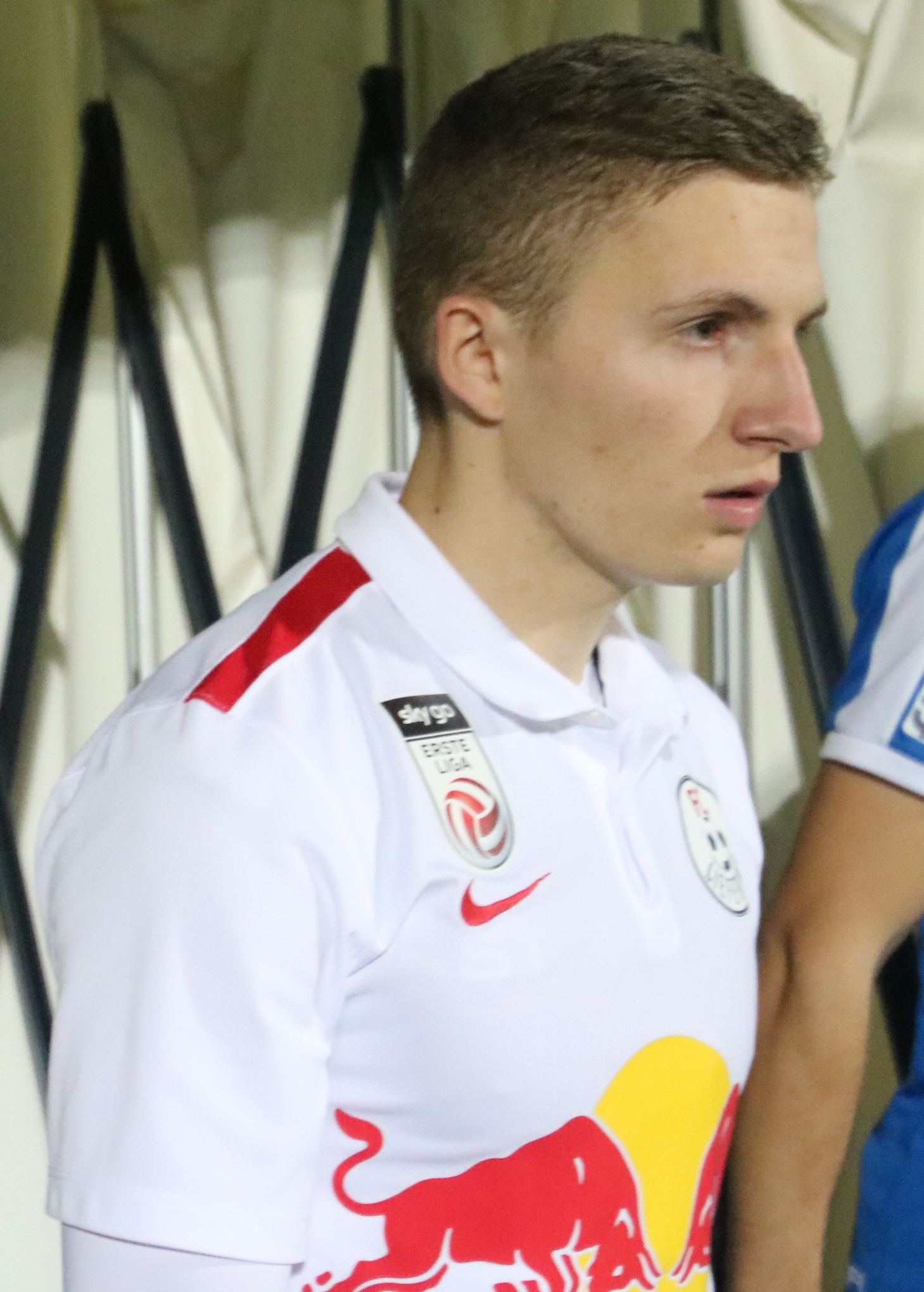
- Schuster with Liefering in 2017

Personal information
- Date of birth: 29 July 1998 (age 28)
- Place of birth: Germany
- Height: 1.76 m (5 ft 9 in)
- Position: Midfielder

Team information
- Current team: SV Schalding-Heining
- Number: 24

Youth career
- 2013–2016: Red Bull Salzburg

Senior career*
Years	Team	Apps	(Gls)
2016–2018	FC Liefering	20	(0)
2018–	SV Schalding-Heining	31	(0)
- * Club domestic league appearances and goals as of 1 July 2021

Maximilian Schuster (born 29 July 1998) is a German footballer who plays as a midfielder for SV Schalding-Heining.

== Club career ==
Schuster made his Austrian Football First League debut for FC Liefering on 3 March 2017 in a game against Floridsdorfer AC.
