= Ines Obradović =

Montenegrin footballer

Personal information
- Date of birth: 23 March 1998 (age 28)
- Place of birth: Montenegro, FR Yugoslavia
- Position: Goalkeeper

International career^{‡}
Years	Team	Apps	(Gls)
	Montenegro	13	(0)
- ‡ National team caps and goals as of 19:45, 30 August 2019 (UTC)

Ines Obradović (Serbian Cyrillic: Инес Обрадовић; born 23 March 1998) is a Montenegrin footballer who plays as a goalkeeper and has appeared for the Montenegro women's national team.

== Career ==
Obradović has been capped for the Montenegro national team, appearing for the team during the 2019 FIFA Women's World Cup qualifying cycle.
