= Nathan Vitré =

French footballer (born 1998)

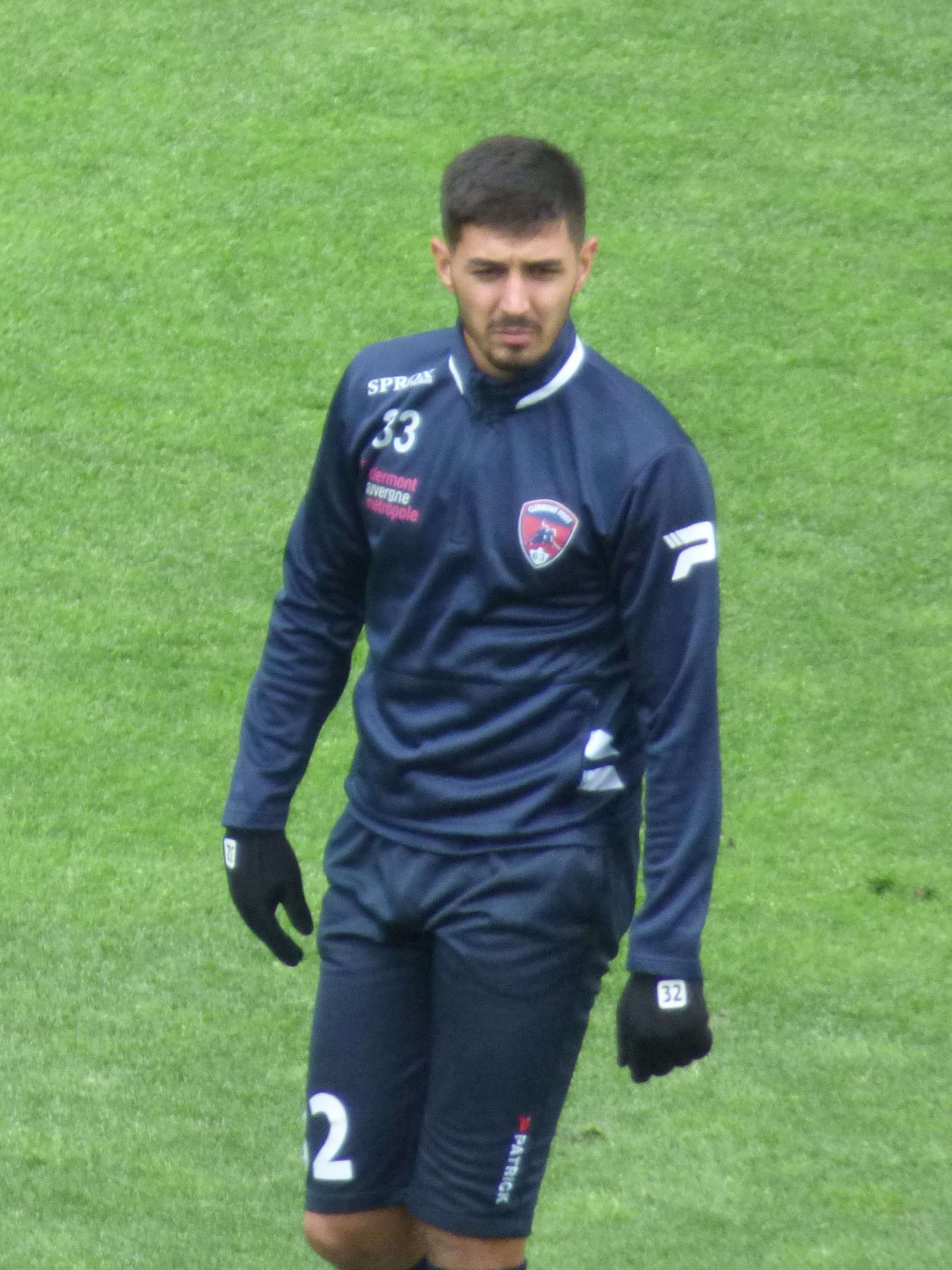
- Vitré with Clermont in 2019

Personal information
- Date of birth: 3 March 1998 (age 28)
- Place of birth: Cholet, France
- Height: 1.80 m (5 ft 11 in)
- Position: Left-back

Team information
- Current team: Angoulême

Senior career*
Years	Team	Apps	(Gls)
2015–2018	Angers B	38	(0)
2018–2019	Clermont B	23	(2)
2018	Clermont	0	(0)
2019–2023	Moulins Yzeure	60	(1)
2023–2026	Bourg-Péronnas	58	(1)
2026–	Angoulême	0	(0)
- * Club domestic league appearances and goals as of 23 June 2026

Nathan Vitré (French pronunciation: [natɑ̃ vitʁe]; born 3 March 1998) is a French professional footballer who plays as a left-back for Championnat National 1 club Angoulême.

== Career ==
Vitré made his professional debut for Clermont in a 3–1 Coupe de la Ligue loss to Troyes on 28 August 2018.
