= Theo Maia =

Brazilian footballer

Personal information
- Full name: Theo Maia Marques de Oliveira
- Date of birth: 29 January 1998 (age 28)
- Place of birth: Rio de Janeiro, Brazil
- Height: 1.79 m (5 ft 10 in)
- Position: Midfielder

Team information
- Current team: Falcon

Youth career
- 2011: Audax-RJ
- 2012: Fluminense
- 2013–2018: Flamengo

Senior career*
Years	Team	Apps	(Gls)
2019	Isloch Minsk Raion	14	(0)
2020–2021	Nacional-MG	9	(0)
2022	Nacional-AM	7	(0)
2023–	Falcon	23	(1)
2024	→ Capital (loan)	9	(0)
- * Club domestic league appearances and goals as of 31 December 2024

Theo Maia Marques de Oliveira (born 29 January 1998) is a Brazilian professional footballer who plays for Falcon.
