= Anders Winroth =

Swedish medieval historian (born 1965)

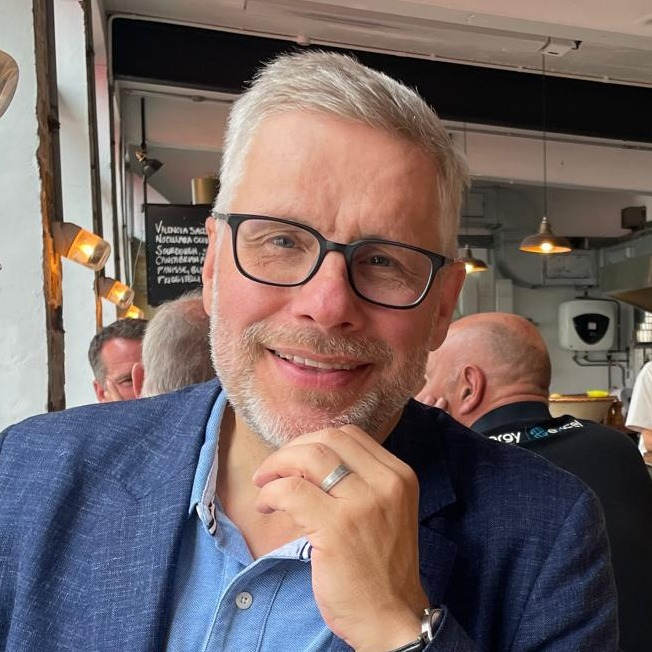
- Anders Winroth
- Born: 1965 (age 60–61); Ludvika, Sweden
- Education: Stockholm University; Columbia University
- Awards: MacArthur Fellows Program
- Scientific career
- Fields: History
- Workplaces: Yale University, University of Oslo
- Doctoral advisor: Robert Somerville
- Other academic advisors: R. I. Moore

Anders Winroth (born 1965) is a Swedish medievalist at the University of Oslo and previously taught in the same field at Yale University.

== Life ==
After graduation from Stockholm University, Winroth did his master's and doctoral studies at Columbia University under Robert Somerville, followed by postdoctoral research at the University of Newcastle, where he was the Sir James Knott Research Fellow and worked with R. I. Moore.

Professor Winroth specializes in the history of "medieval Europe, especially religious, intellectual and legal history as well as the Viking Age. He teaches both halves of the survey lecture course in medieval history, seminars in religious, legal, intellectual, and Scandinavian history."

He worked on the Decretum Gratiani of Gratian and discovered that the original version, the so-called "first recension," was only about half the size of the commonly known text. Winroth also has a strong interest in Swedish genealogy.

Winroth was a 2003 MacArthur Fellow.

He is married to medievalist Jóhanna Katrín Friðriksdóttir. She works for the National Library of Norway and is known for her scholarship on women in the Viking world.

== Works ==
- "Vi fattiga systrar" : en undersökning av Klara klosters godsinnehav, Stockholm: Stockholm University, 1990
- The Making of Gratian's Decretum, Cambridge: Cambridge University Press, 2000, ISBN 0-521-63264-1
- "Papal letters to Scandinavia and their preservation", Charters, cartularies and archives, 2002, ISBN 0-88844-817-1
- The Conversion of Scandinavia: Vikings, Merchants, and Missionaries in the Remaking of Northern Europe, New Haven: Yale University Press, 2011
- The Age of the Vikings, Princeton and Woodstock: Princeton University Press, 2014
- Peter Monaghan (August 11, 2000), "Yale Scholar, Revisiting the 'Decretum,' Opens a Window on the 12th Century", The Chronicle of Higher Education
