= Elisabet Vang =

Faroese footballer

Personal information
- Date of birth: 24 April 1998 (age 28)
- Position: Defender

Senior career*
Years	Team	Apps	(Gls)
–2020	B36		

International career
- Faroe Islands

Managerial career
- 2021–2022: KÍ (physical coach)
- 2023: KÍ (physical coach)
- 2024: Fredrikstad (physical coach)
- 2025–2026: AIK (physical coach)
- * Club domestic league appearances and goals

Elisabet Vang (born 24 April 1998) is a Faroese footballer, bikini fitness competitor and physical coach.

== Career ==
As a footballer, Vang was capped for the Faroe Islands national team, appearing for the team during the 2019 FIFA Women's World Cup qualifying cycle. She played for the club B36 before retiring in 2020.

She competed in bikini fitness.

In 2021 and 2022 she was physical coach for Klaksvíkar Ítróttarfelag, both men and women. She returned to KÍ in July 2023 and was a part of their unprecedented run in the 2023–24 UEFA Europa Conference League. After manager Mikkjal Thomassen left KÍ for Scandinavia, Vang was hired in his staff, first in Fredrikstad FK and then in AIK. After Thomassen was sacked by AIK, Vang remained in the club until January 2026.
