= Benjamin Cull =

English footballer (1998–2023)

Personal information
- Date of birth: 21 October 1998
- Place of birth: Bournemouth, England
- Date of death: 14 September 2023 (aged 24)
- Place of death: Christchurch, Dorset, England
- Position: Defender

Benjamin Cull (21 October 1998 – 14 September 2023) was an English professional footballer who played as a defender. In 2012, Cull joined Southampton F.C.'s academy, rising through each age group. He represented England, aged 14 in their U16 team and Southampton FC in their U21 team. In 2017, Cull was diagnosed with cancer, forcing him to retire from football. On 14 September 2023, Cull died, aged 24.

== Early life ==
Cull was born on 21 October 1998, in Bournemouth, Dorset to Julie and Simon Cull. He attended Bournemouth School for Boys.

Cull started playing football from the age of 6, stating he started after 'my mum dragged me to Littledown' (a local sports centre in Bournemouth). After this, Cull starting playing with his local Sunday league team, Greenfields in the Bournemouth Youth League, aged 7.

He stated that growing up, he supported Chelsea but described that it was only because of his friends supporting them. He stated that as soon as he started playing for Southampton, he had a reason to support someone.

Cull's parents never had much money as he grew up and he stated that they gave up a lot in order for him and his siblings to play football, getting into debt in order to facilitate this.

== Professional football career ==
At 13, Cull was scouted by Portsmouth, attending a trial for the club. Southampton found out that Cull had been for a trial at Portsmouth and also offered him a trial. After completing a trial with Portsmouth, Cull was offered a four-year contract. He was also offered a contract from Southampton. Cull stated that it made sense for him to sign with Southampton, as his younger brother also played for the club.

Cull began his professional football career as part of Southampton's academy, aged 13. Other notable alumni from this academy include Gareth Bale, Theo Walcott, Alex Oxlade-Chamberlain and Luke Shaw.

During this time, Cull went to school two days a week, on a Monday and Friday, playing football on Tuesday, Wednesday and Thursday. Speaking to BBC South Today in February 2020, Cull described how he 'pretty much moved up' to Southampton, living there for the majority of the week for up to six or seven years. Whilst in Southampton, he lived with a host family in Hythe, Hampshire, from age 16 to 19 with three other players.

At 14, Cull's manager at the time rang him and explained that England wanted him to go to a training camp. He attended, training alongside Trent Alexander-Arnold and Tom Davies. In October 2013, Cull made his England under-16 debut, aged 14, during the Sky Sports Victory Shield match against Wales. His debut made Cull the second player from his youth team, Greenfields, to play for England, after former AFC Bournemouth and Liverpool player Jamie Redknapp.

In the summer of 2015, aged 16, he became part of Southampton's U18 team. Cull stated that he had the choice of joining Bournemouth, Portsmouth or Southampton, choosing the latter. Aged 17, he scored for Southampton in a match against Norwich City FC after playing in a different position to that of his usual defence position. He later represented Southampton FC in their U21 team.

== Cancer diagnosis ==
During a friendly match against Plymouth Argyle, Cull got kneed in the back of his leg during a tackle. He went down, thinking it was just a 'dead leg'. Cull's knee swelled up and it was thought that he had received ligament damage. Cull received an MRI scan, which revealed a hematoma on the back of his knee. He was told that this would reduce on its own and Cull described the pain going, allowing him to return to playing football.

Cull kept on playing for the rest of the season before a physio noticed that he had a large lump on the right side of his leg. After attending hospital, staff tried to aspirate the lump, however, it required surgery. Prior to this surgery, Cull went to Reading, Berkshire, where a biopsy was taken of the lump. After this, an emergency appointment was arranged with an oncologist in Watford. Cull received news that it was Ewing's sarcoma, a rare form of bone cancer, with a 5% survival rate over five years. Cull stated that it was his mindset that medical staff said that because 'they have to'. Cull discovered the chance of a person getting Ewing's sarcoma was 0.4% and that only four people every year in the UK got bone cancer. Cull was told that he would not ever play football again and was told that he was lucky he was keeping his leg, however, he stated he expected to have the surgery and work hard to play football again.

Cull was initially in treatment for a year, with nine months of intensive chemotherapy, two months of radiotherapy and had a knee replacement in February 2017 (Cull required a knee replacement as the cancer was growing from the bone). After treatment, he was given the all clear, however, Cull stated that it was only once he had the operation that he discovered that he could only just about walk and could not run. He stated it was then that it hit him that he could not play football anymore. In 2017, aged 17, Cull was forced to retire professionally from football.

Cull had regular checkups after he was first diagnosed with cancer, every three months. In 2019, weeks before his 21st birthday, an abnormality was found on Cull's lung after a routine checkup. Further scans revealed that it was cancer. Cull's newest diagnosis was that the cancer was across both of his lungs and that it was terminal. Cull was told that the treatments he had were life prolonging ones and designed to slow the cancer down. Cull said that when he got re-diagnosed, he had never felt healthier, going to the gym every day, working for a bank and as a personal trainer, working from 6 am to 10 pm, Monday to Friday.

Cull stopped playing football completely in July 2020.

== Post-football career ==
After his diagnosis, Cull was offered to go into coaching by Southampton F.C., however, he stated that this was 'too close to home', as if he wanted to be involved in football, he wanted to be playing it. Instead, he became qualified as a personal trainer. A person at Southampton FC knew of someone who ran a gym in Shirley, Hampshire, where Cull then started working there as a personal trainer, as well as working in a bank.

Cull started fundraising for the Teenage Cancer Trust, raising over £20,000. From this, Cull was then inducted into Southampton F.C.'s Academy Alumni Hall of Fame as the inaugural inductee. He also won the Premier League's Academy Alumni award.

== Personal life ==
Cull had an interest in cars and golf.

Cull has two sisters and brother, two of whom have played for England and Southampton as goalkeepers.

Cull got engaged to his partner Daisy Morrison on Friday 18 August 2023. Cull had met Morrison in December 2019 after talking via Instagram. Morrison claimed that Cull used his cancer as a chat up line, stating that he would tell her about it 'over a date'. Morrison stated that she could not really say no.

In August 2022, Cull's partner Daisy Morrison set up a GoFundMe page for the couple to go on holidays, adventures and through a bucket list for Cull. Morrison mentioned how Cull had done 'insane amounts of fundraising for Teenage Cancer Trust' but that she thought it was time he got help 'to do everything he wants to do and make memories with those around him'.

As of September 2023, £25,000 has been donated. The donations paid for, amongst other things, Cull and Morrison to visit a spa and golf hotel in Wales, get tickets for the PGA BMW Championships 2022 at Wentworth and a chance for Cull to play golf at the St Andrews Golf Course.

Cull created a bucket list that included what he described as 'cliche', such as going to the Maldives and track days. Other ideas included going on a road trip to Monaco, going to Disneyland in Florida, to New York at Christmas and go on a cruise.

One idea was to go to the Formula 1 at Silverstone, which Cull did with his father in July 2022.

A left-field bucket list idea was for Cull to 'try oysters and lobster'. Cull discussed going skydiving, however, he had a fear of heights, noting only being able to go to the middle floor when climbing the Eiffel Tower.

== Death ==
On Thursday 14 September, Cull died from cancer at a Macmillan Hospice in Christchurch, Dorset, where he was receiving care. He was aged 24.

On Saturday 16 September, Southampton FC announced that before their home game against Ipswich Town on Tuesday 19 September, they would be holding a minute's applause in memory of Cull.
