= Lee Winroth =

Swedish footballer

Personal information
- Date of birth: 2 September 1998 (age 28)
- Place of birth: Sweden
- Position: Forward

Team information
- Current team: Sundsvall

Senior career*
Years	Team	Apps	(Gls)
2015–2017	Kvarnsveden	26	(0)
2021–	Sundsvall	4	(1)
- * Club domestic league appearances and goals as of 09:06, 11 May 2021 (UTC)

Lee Winroth (born 2 September 1998) is a Swedish footballer and weightlifter. In football, she plays as a forward for Sundsvalls DFF.

== Powerlifting career ==
Winroth broke a world record for lifting 190 kilograms in a deadlift at the age of 16. This was unofficial, however, as it took place during a training session. Videos of Winroth powerlifting went viral on YouTube. In February 2016, she repeated the feat in a competition, therefore becoming the official world record holder for deadlift.

== Personal life ==
Winroth was diagnosed with scoliosis from a young age.
