= Manuel Trías =

Venezuelan footballer (born 1997)

Personal information
- Full name: Manuel Augusta Trías Parada
- Date of birth: 18 December 1998 (age 27)
- Place of birth: Maracay, Venezuela
- Height: 1.78 m (5 ft 10 in)
- Position: Center-back

Team information
- Current team: Aragua
- Number: 13

Youth career
- 2014–2016: Aragua

Senior career*
Years	Team	Apps	(Gls)
2016–	Aragua	25	(0)
- * Club domestic league appearances and goals as of 22 April 2021

Manuel Augusta Trías Parada (born 18 December 1998) is a Venezuelan footballer who plays as a defender for Aragua F.C. in the Venezuelan Primera División.

== Career ==
=== Aragua ===
A graduate of the club's youth academy, Trías made his competitive debut for the club on 24 March 2016 in a 1-1 draw with Trujillanos. In 2018, he signed a two-year extension with the club. At the end of that contract period, Trías signed a further two-year extension.

== Career statistics ==
=== Club ===
As of match played 12 April 2021

Appearances and goals by club, season and competition
Club	Season	League			Cup		Continental (Note: Includes appearances in the Copa Sudamericana)		Other (Note: Includes appearances in the Venezuelan Primera División knockout stage)		Total	
Club	Season	Division	Apps	Goals	Apps	Goals	Apps	Apps	Goals	Goals	Apps	Goals
Aragua	2016	Venezuelan Primera División	5	0	0	0	—	—	3	0	8	0
Aragua	2017	Venezuelan Primera División	7	0	1	0	—	—	0	0	8	0
Aragua	2018	Venezuelan Primera División	5	0	0	0	—	—	0	0	5	0
Aragua	2019	Venezuelan Primera División	6	0	0	0	—	—	0	0	6	0
Aragua	2020	Venezuelan Primera División	2	0	0	0	0	0	0	0	2	0
Aragua	2021	Venezuelan Primera División	0	0	0	0	0	0	0	0	0	0
Career total			25	0	1	0	0	0	3	0	29	0
