= Alessandro Fratangelo =

Italian football player (born 1998)

Personal information
- Full name: Alessandro Fratangelo
- Date of birth: 7 May 1998 (age 28)
- Place of birth: Termoli, Italy
- Height: 1.75 m (5 ft 9 in)
- Position: Forward

Team information
- Current team: Mezzolara Calcio

Youth career
- –2016: Teramo

Senior career*
Years	Team	Apps	(Gls)
2016–2018	Teramo	43	(3)
2018–2019	Pineto	22	(3)
2019	Sasso Marconi Zola	10	(0)
2019-2025	Granamica ASD		
2025-	Mezzolara Calcio		
- * Club domestic league appearances and goals as of 02:06, 25 January 2020 (UTC)

Alessandro Fratangelo (born 7 May 1998) is an Italian football player. He plays for Mezzolara Calcio in Eccellenza as a forward.

== Club career ==
=== Teramo ===
On 27 August 2016, Fratangelo made his professional debut, in Serie C, for Teramo, as a substitute replacing Alessandro Di Paolantonio in the 72nd minute of a 2–0 away defeat against Lumezzane. In October 2016 he suffers an ankle injury that will keep him off the field for about 2 months. On 19 November he scored his first professional goal, as a substitute, in the 79th minute of a 3–2 home win over Ancona. On 11 December, Fratangelo played his first match as a starter, a 1–1 away draw against Parma, he was replaced by Marco Sansovini in the 80th minute. On 1 April 2017 he scored his second goal in the 29th minute of a 2–1 home win over Sambenedettese.

=== Later career ===
After playing for Serie D clubs Pineto Calcio and Sasso Marconi Zola, Fratangelo moved to Eccellenza club Granamica ASD on 13 December 2019. In 2025, He moved to Mezzolara Calcio, always in Eccellenza after a relegation from Serie D.

== Career statistics ==
=== Club ===
As of 5 June 2018

Club	Season	League			Cup		Europe		Other		Total	
Club	Season	League	Apps	Goals	Apps	Goals	Apps	Goals	Apps	Goals	Apps	Goals
Teramo	2016–17	Serie C	20	2	0	0	—		—		20	2
Teramo	2017–18	Serie C	19	0	0	0	—		—		19	0
Career total			39	2	0	0	—		—		39	2
