= SS Empire =

The SS Empire was the second steamboat for the Troy Line, built in the United States in 1843, and captained by R. B. Macey. The paddle boxes were lettered "Empire of Troy", as the owners did not want travelers mistaking the boat for an Albany liner. The Empire was, at the time, the largest steam vessel in the world, at 936 tons, 307 feet length, 30 feet beam and 9 feet depth of hold.

== First collision ==
She was sunk in a collision with the schooner Noah Brown on the Hudson River, near Newburgh NY, on May 17, 1849. Twenty-three or twenty-four people were killed, including Margaret Carson, wife of James S. Carson, and their daughter Isabella. She was raised and taken to the Sectional Dock in New York City. Repaired, she returned to service on 31 August 1849.

== Second collision ==
At about 02:00AM the morning of 16 July 1853, she was struck by the General Livingston (some accounts refer to the "Chancellor Livingston"), on the Hudson not far north of where she was sunk several years before. The Empire's boiler was torn from its mountings, and several people died on this occasion.
