= Chestnut Street Historic District (Camden, Maine) =

Historic district in Maine, United States

- U.S. National Register of Historic Places
- U.S. Historic district
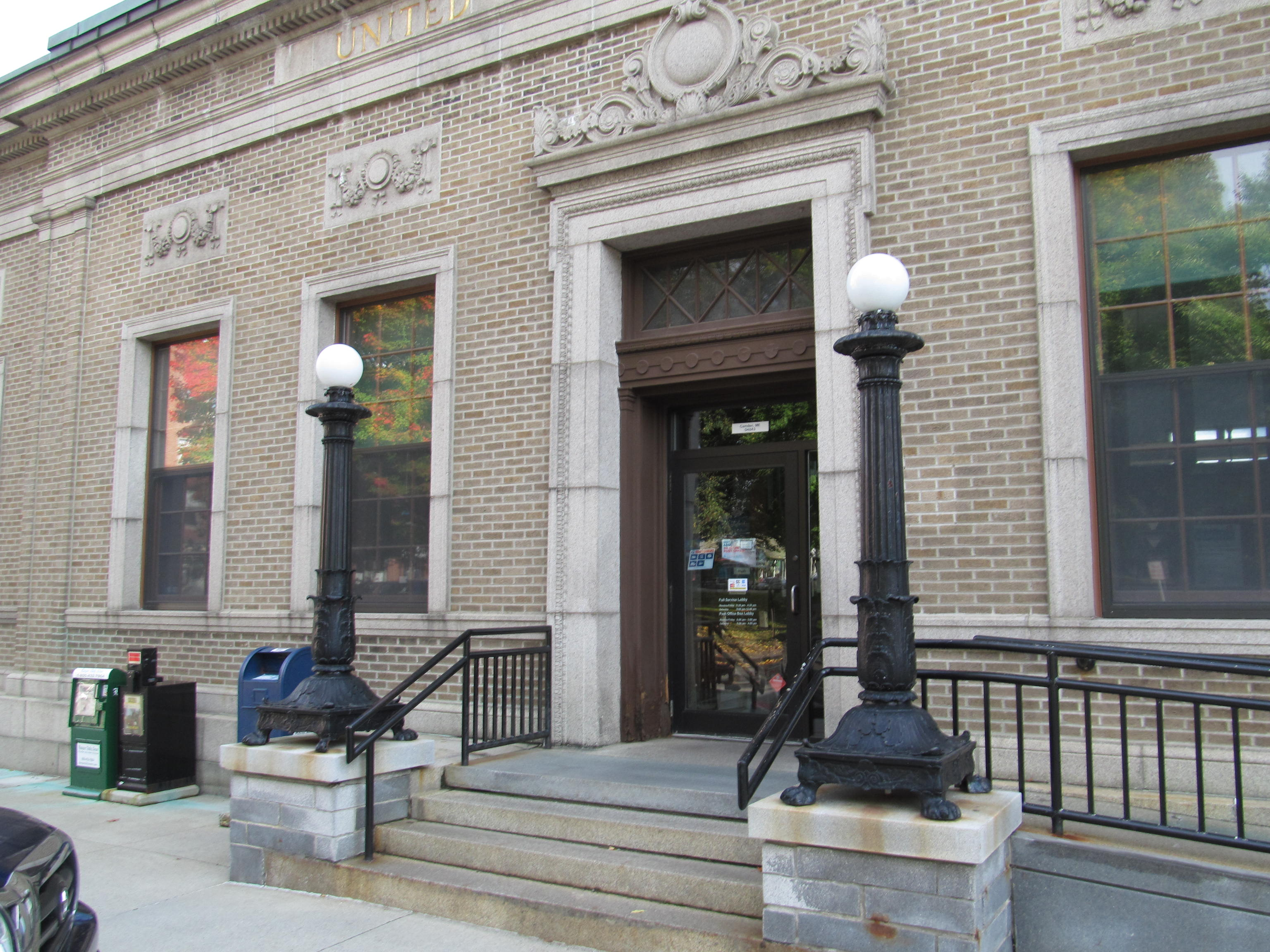
- The Camden Post Office, October 2012

- Location within Maine Location within the United States
- Location: Chestnut Street from Elm Street to Beacon Avenue, including parts of Penobscot Avenue, Pleasant and Wood streets, and Dillingham Point; Camden, Maine; United States
- Coordinates: 44°12′13″N 69°3′43″W
- Area: 60 acres (24 ha)
- Built by: Multiple, including Cyrus P. Brown, S.G. Ritterbush
- Architectural style: Greek Revival, Queen Anne, Federal
- NRHP reference No.: 91000325
- Added to NRHP: March 22, 1991

The Chestnut Street Historic District encompasses a predominantly residential part of Camden, Maine, United States, which represents a cross-section of the town's architectural history, and of its transition from a shipping center to a summer resort community. The district extends south from the town common, along Chestnut Street, and then east to Dillingham Point. It was listed on the National Register of Historic Places in 1991.

== Description and history ==
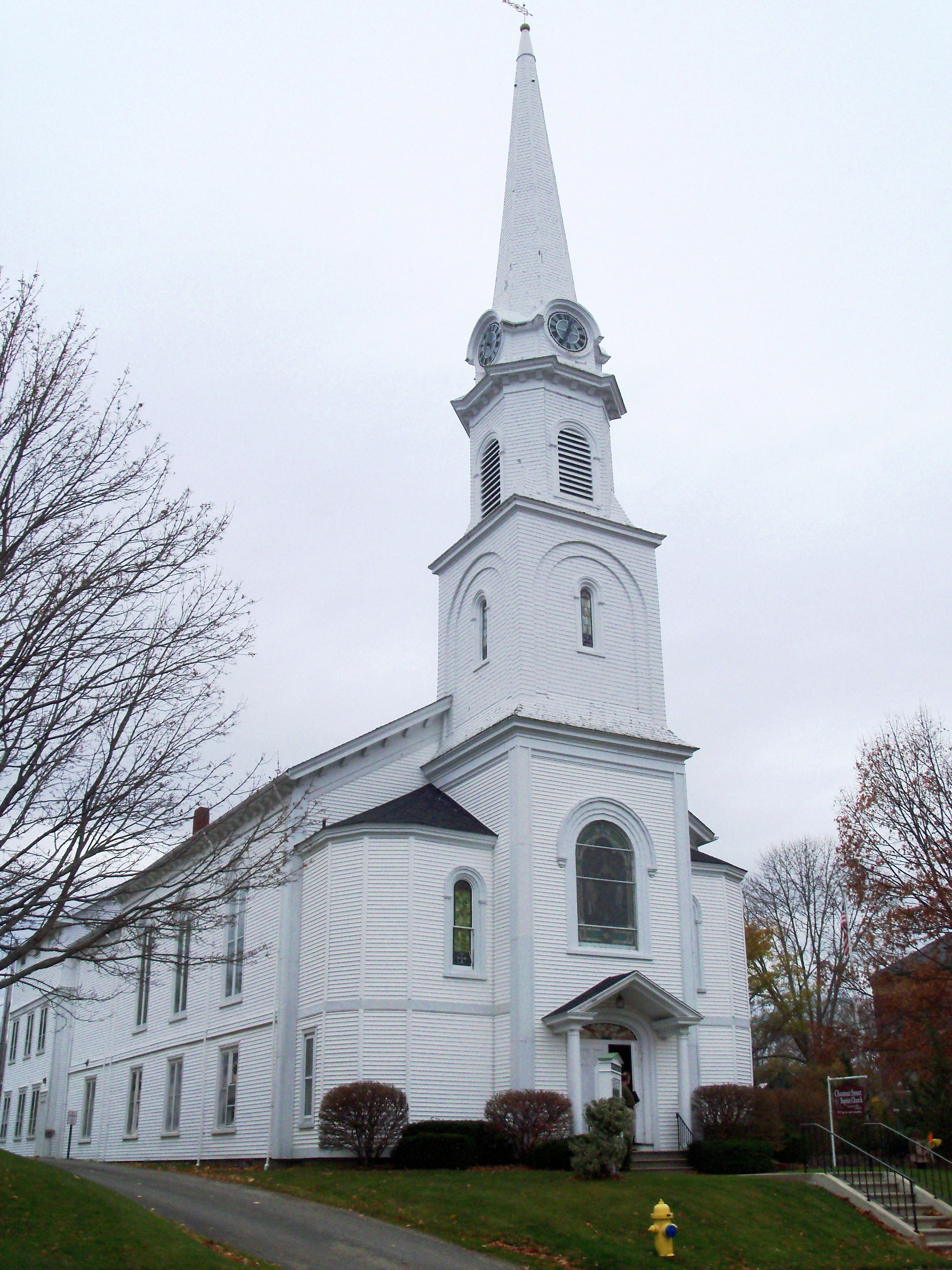
The Chestnut Street Baptist Church, November 2010

The town of Camden is centered on the mouth of the Megunticook River on the west side of Penobscot Bay in the Mid Coast region of coastal Maine. It was first settled in the 1760s, but did not experience significant early development until the 1780s, after the American Revolutionary War. Its early industry was shipbuilding, which was augmented in the mid-19th century by lime quarrying. Both industries declined in the late 19th century, and were eventually replaced by the summer tourist trade.

Chestnut Street extends roughly southeast from the town common, which is located just south of the river, and roughly parallels the western bank of the river, above Bay View Road, which provides direct access to the waterfront. Originally farmland in the early days of the town, the area is now home to some of Camden's oldest surviving buildings, especially along Wood and Pleasant Streets, which were laid out as a subdivision just south of the common. As the town grew, residential development took place along Chestnut Street, resulting in a number of fine mid-19th century Greek Revival and Italianate houses. Camden's earliest summer houses were built at Dillingham Point, marking the southern point of the river's mouth, in the 1880s, and the area now sports several fine Shingle style houses. The point is also where the fine brick 1830s Cape style Ogier house stands; it was built by one of the area's early settlers, and was later transformed into a summer house.

== See also ==
- National Register of Historic Places listings in Knox County, Maine
