= Glen Cove =

Glen Cove or Glencove may refer to several places in the United States:

Alphabetical by state

- Glen Cove, Maine
- Glen Cove, in Berkeley Township, New Jersey
- Glen Cove, New York
  - Glen Cove Avenue
  - Glen Cove Christian Academy
  - Glen Cove City School District
  - Glen Cove Creek
  - Glen Cove Gurdwara
  - Glen Cove High School
  - Glen Cove Hospital
  - Glen Cove station
- Glen Cove, Texas
- Crestwood/Glen Cove, Houston, a neighborhood in Houston, Texas
- Glencove, Washington
  - Glencove Hotel

== See also ==
- The Glencoves, a 1960s American folk pop group
