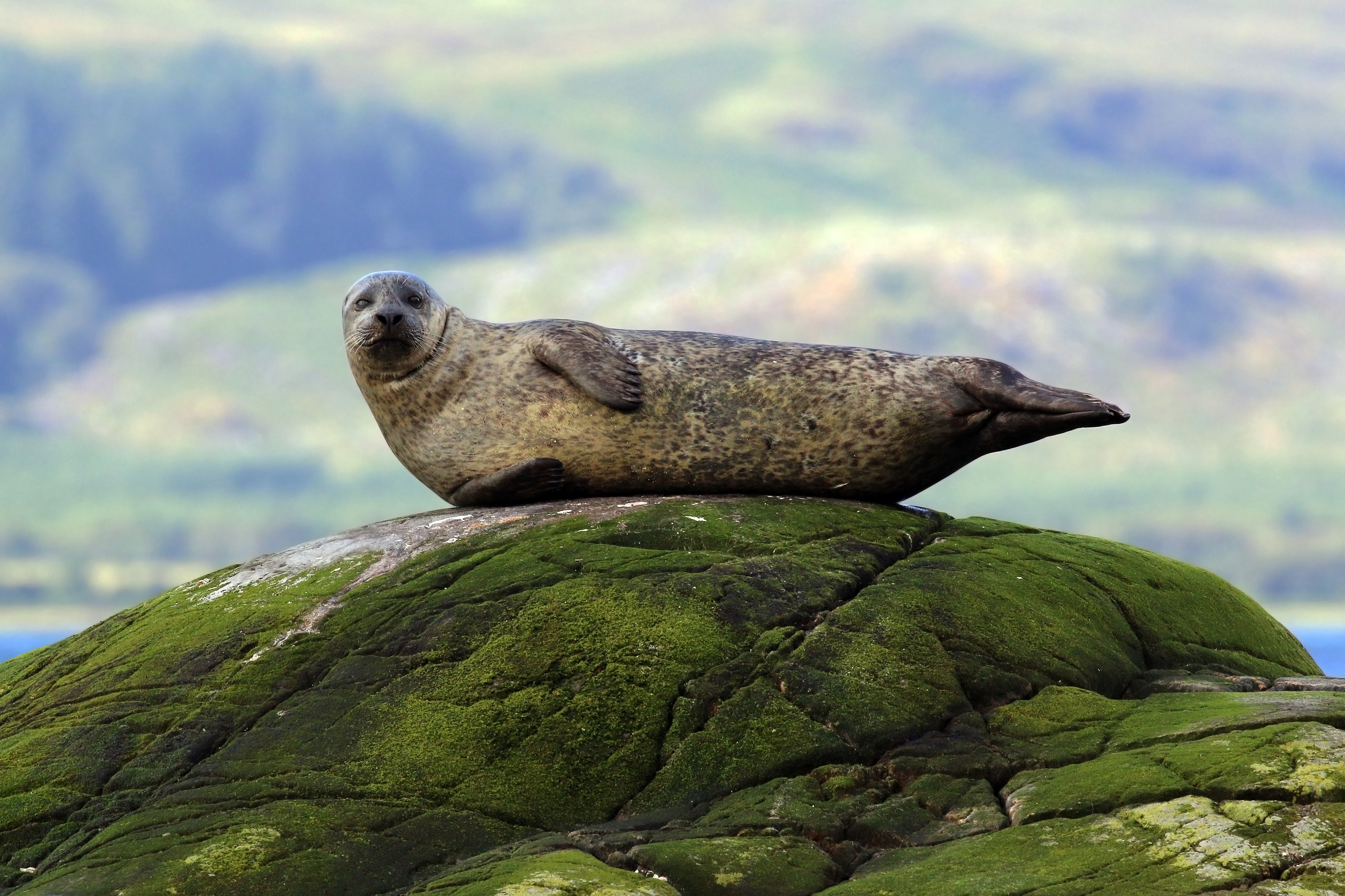
- P. v. vitulina off Lismore, Scotland, 2015

Conservation status
- Least Concern (IUCN 3.1)

Scientific classification
- Kingdom: Animalia
- Phylum: Chordata
- Class: Mammalia
- Order: Carnivora
- Parvorder: Pinnipedia
- Family: Phocidae
- Genus: Phoca
- Species: P. vitulina

Binomial name
- Phoca vitulina Linnaeus, 1758

Subspecies
- P. vitulina mellonae (Doutt, 1942); P. vitulina richardii (Gray, 1864); P. vitulina vitulina (Linnaeus, 1758)
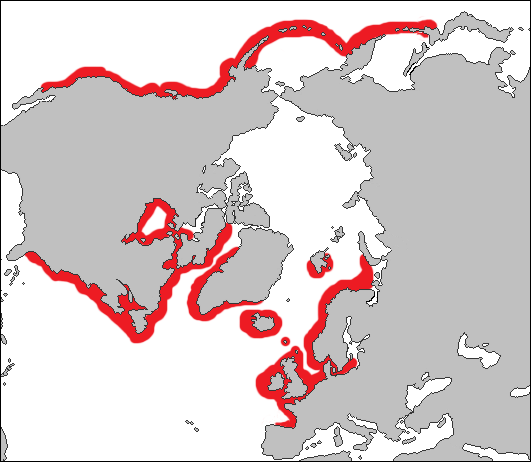
- Harbour Seal Range

= Harbor seal =

Species of pinniped

The harbor (or harbour) seal (Phoca vitulina), also known as the common seal, is a true seal found along temperate and Arctic marine coastlines of the Northern Hemisphere. The most widely distributed species of pinniped (walruses, eared seals, and true seals), they are found in coastal waters of the northern Atlantic and Pacific oceans, Baltic and North seas.

Harbor seals are brown, silvery white, tan, and sometimes grey, depending on where they are from with distinctive V-shaped nostrils. An adult can attain a length of 1.85 m (6.1 ft) and weigh up to 168 kg (370 lb). Blubber under the seal's skin helps to maintain body temperature. Females outlive males (30–35 years versus 20–25 years). Harbor seals stick to familiar resting spots or haulout sites, generally rocky areas (although ice, sand, and mud may also be used) where they are protected from adverse weather conditions and predation, near a foraging area. Males may fight over mates under water and on land. Females bear a single pup after a nine-month gestation, which they care for alone. Pups can weigh up to 16 kg (35 lb) and are able to swim and dive within hours of birth. They develop quickly on their mothers' fat-rich milk, and are weaned after four to six weeks.

The global population of harbor seals is 350,000–500,000, but the freshwater subspecies Ungava seal in Northern Quebec is endangered. Once a common practice, sealing is now illegal in many nations within the animal's range.

== Description ==
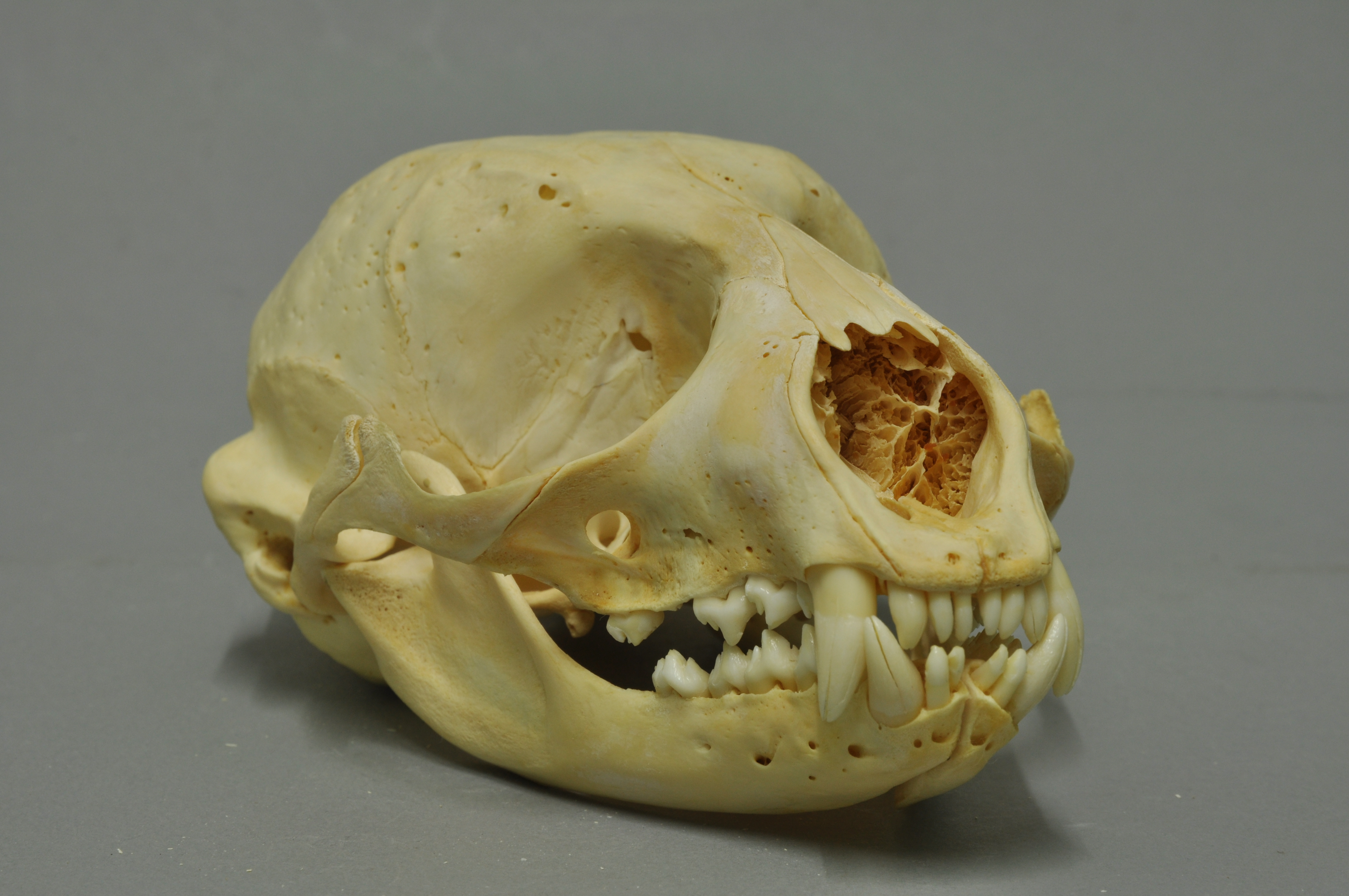
Skull of a harbor seal

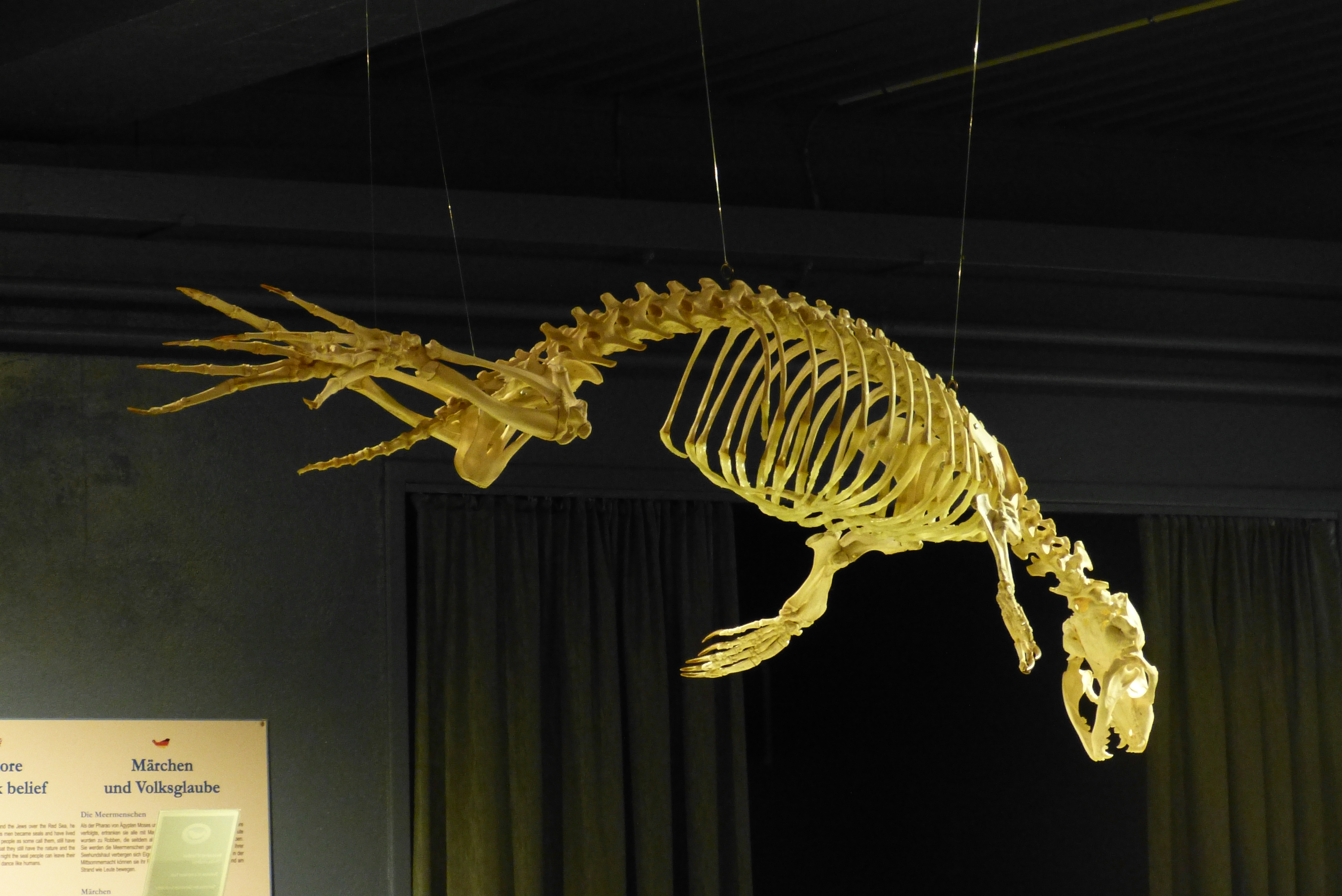
Skeleton of a harbor seal in the Seal Museum in Iceland

Individual harbor seals possess a unique pattern of spots, either dark on a light background or light on a dark. They vary in colour from brownish black to tan or grey; underparts are generally lighter. The body and flippers are short, heads are rounded. Nostrils appear distinctively V-shaped. As with other true seals, there is no pinna (ear flap). An ear canal may be visible behind the eye. Including the head and flippers, they may reach an adult length of 1.85 m (6.1 ft) and a weight of 55 to 168 kg (120 to 370 lb). Females are generally smaller than males.

== Subspecies ==
There are three recognized subspecies of Phoca vitulina:

Image	Subspecies	Common name	Distribution
	P. v. vitulina (L., 1758)	Atlantic common seal	Northern Atlantic Ocean, including Barents Sea, Davis Strait and Baffin Bay
	P. v. mellonae (Doutt, 1942)	Ungava seal (Lacs des Loups Marins seals)	Eastern Canada in fresh water
	P. v. richardii (Gray, 1864)	Pacific harbor seal	Northern Pacific Ocean

Two other subspecies are proposed, but currently not recognized: P. v. concolor (DeKay, 1842), Western Atlantic common seal; and P. v. stejnegeri, (J. A. Allen, 1902) Eastern Asia.

== Population ==
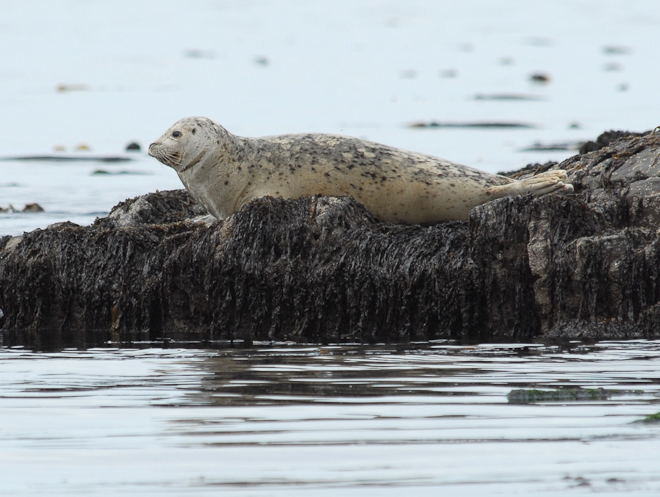
White harbor seal on moss, Alaska

There are an estimated 350,000–500,000 harbor seals worldwide. While the population is not threatened as a whole, the Greenland, Hokkaidō and Baltic Sea populations are exceptions. Local populations have been reduced or eliminated through disease (especially the phocine distemper virus) and conflict with humans, both unintentionally and intentionally. Killing seals perceived to threaten fisheries is legal in Norway, and Canada, but commercial hunting is illegal. Seals are also taken in subsistence hunting and accidentally as bycatch (mainly in bottomset nets). Along the Norwegian coast, bycatch accounted for 48% of pup mortality. Killing or taking seals has been illegal in the United Kingdom since 1 March 2021.. The River Thames has rehabilitated seal populations in London in a once ecologically dead river.

Seals in the United Kingdom are protected by the 1970 Conservation of Seals Act, which prohibits most forms of killing. In the United States, the Marine Mammal Protection Act of 1972 prohibits the killing of any marine mammals, and most local ordinances, as well as NOAA, instruct people to leave them alone unless serious danger to the seal exists.

=== In North America ===
==== Pacific Coast ====
The California population of subspecies P. v. richardii amounted to about 25,000 individuals as of 1984. Pacific harbor seals or California harbor seals are found along the entire Pacific Coast shoreline of the state. They prefer to remain relatively close to shore in subtidal and intertidal zones, and have not been seen beyond the Channel Islands as a pelagic form; moreover, they often venture into bays and estuaries and even swim up coastal rivers. They feed in shallow littoral waters on herring, flounder, hake, anchovy, codfish, and sculpin.

Breeding occurs in California from March to May, with pupping between April and May, depending on local populations. As top-level feeders in the kelp forest, harbor seals enhance species diversity and productivity. They are preyed upon by killer whales (orcas) and white sharks. Haul out sites in California include urban beaches and from time to time they can be seen having a nap on the beach in all of San Francisco Bay, which would include the conurbation of Richmond, Oakland, and San Francisco, the Greater Los Angeles area, which would include Santa Barbara, the city of Los Angeles itself, and Long Beach, and all of San Diego, most famously beaches near La Jolla.

Considerable scientific inquiry has been carried out by the Marine Mammal Center and other research organisations beginning in the 1980s regarding the incidence and transmission of diseases in harbor seals in the wild, including analysis of phocine herpesvirus. In San Francisco Bay, some harbor seals are fully or partially reddish in colour, possibly caused by an accumulation of trace elements such as iron or selenium in the ocean, or a change in the hair follicles.

Although some of the largest harbor seal pupping areas are found in California, they are also found north along the Pacific Coast in Oregon, Washington, British Columbia and Alaska. Large populations move with the season south along the west coast of Canada and may winter on the islands in Washington and Oregon. Pupping is known to occur in both Washington and Oregon as of 2020. People are advised to stay at least 50m (164 ft) away from harbor seals that have hauled out on land, especially the pups, as mothers will abandon them when there is excessive human activity nearby.

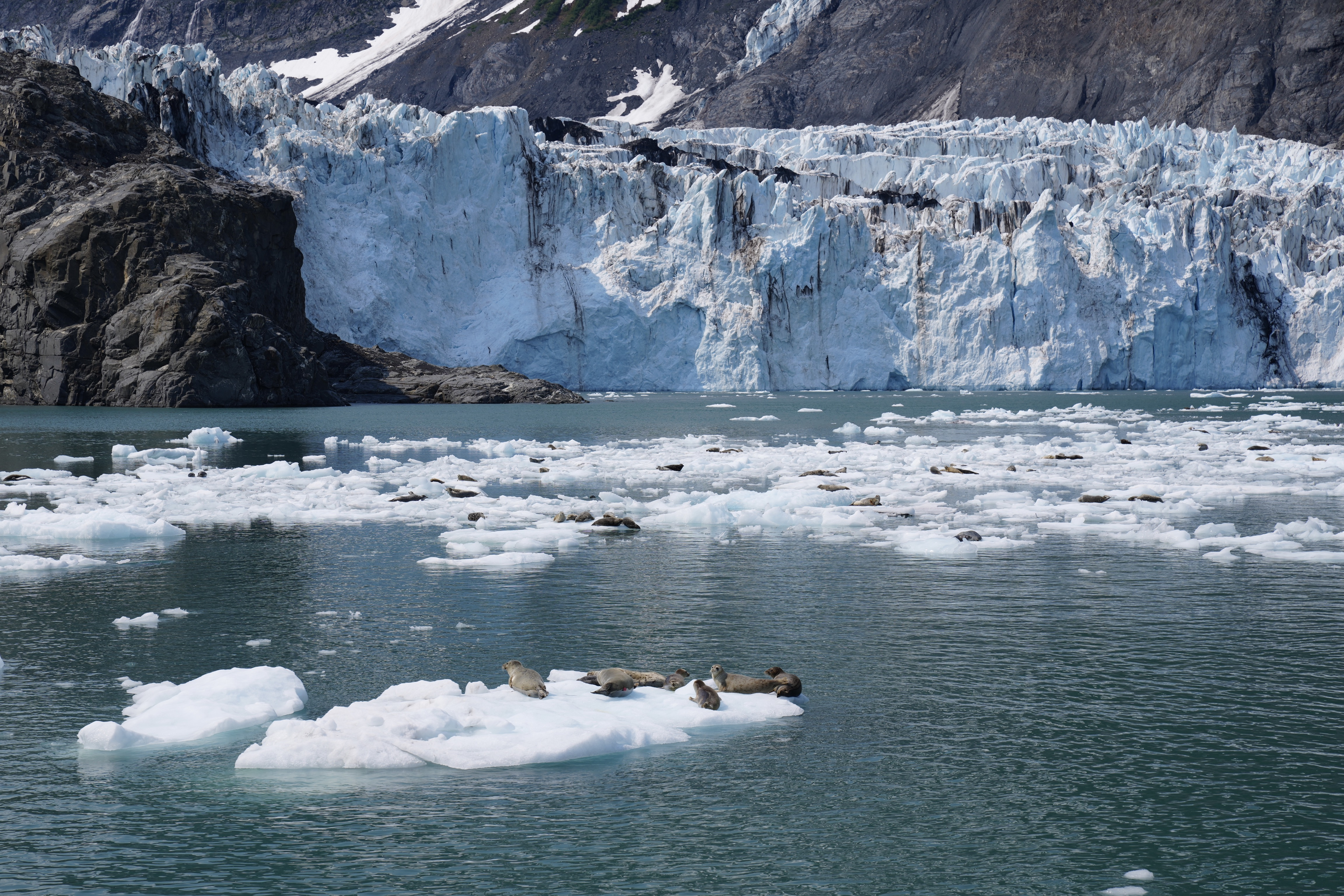
A harbor seal nursery on ice in front of The Grand Pacific Glacier in Glacier Bay National Park, Alaska

==== Atlantic Coast ====
Historically, the range of the harbor seal extended from the mouth of the St. Lawrence River and Greenland to the sandy beaches of North Carolina, a distance of well over 1,600 km (990 mi). Evidence of their presence in these areas is consistent with both the fossil record as well as a few landmarks named after them during colonisation: Robbin's Reef, off of Bayonne, New Jersey, gets its name from the Dutch word robben, meaning "seals". On the border between Canada and the US is an island known as Machias Seal Island, a place where today the harbor seal will occasionally visit but is now a sanctuary for puffins. Over the course of hundreds of years, however, the seal was wiped out steadily by being shot on sight by fishermen and by massive pollution. The evidence for this is found in documents all along the coast of New England which put a bounty on the head of every seal shot, as well as the accounts of harbormasters. New York City, when it was founded in the 1640s, was founded on top of an enormous estuary teeming with life that included the harbor seal. Oil in the 1800s started the process of pollution that was later compounded by even more toxic 20th century chemicals that included PCB's and dioxin. By the time of the 1972 Clean Water Act, New York Harbor was almost dead-almost no living thing could survive in it. Approximately 500 km (310 mi) to the north, Boston Harbor was equally polluted. Raw sewage had been dumped in the harbor since the late 1800s and the stench of faecal matter in the Charles River was overpowering, as evidenced by the song "Dirty Water" by the Standells, written in 1966. Flatfish, abundant in the area, had enormous tumors in their livers by the 1980s and the harbor seal was long gone, shot to oblivion.

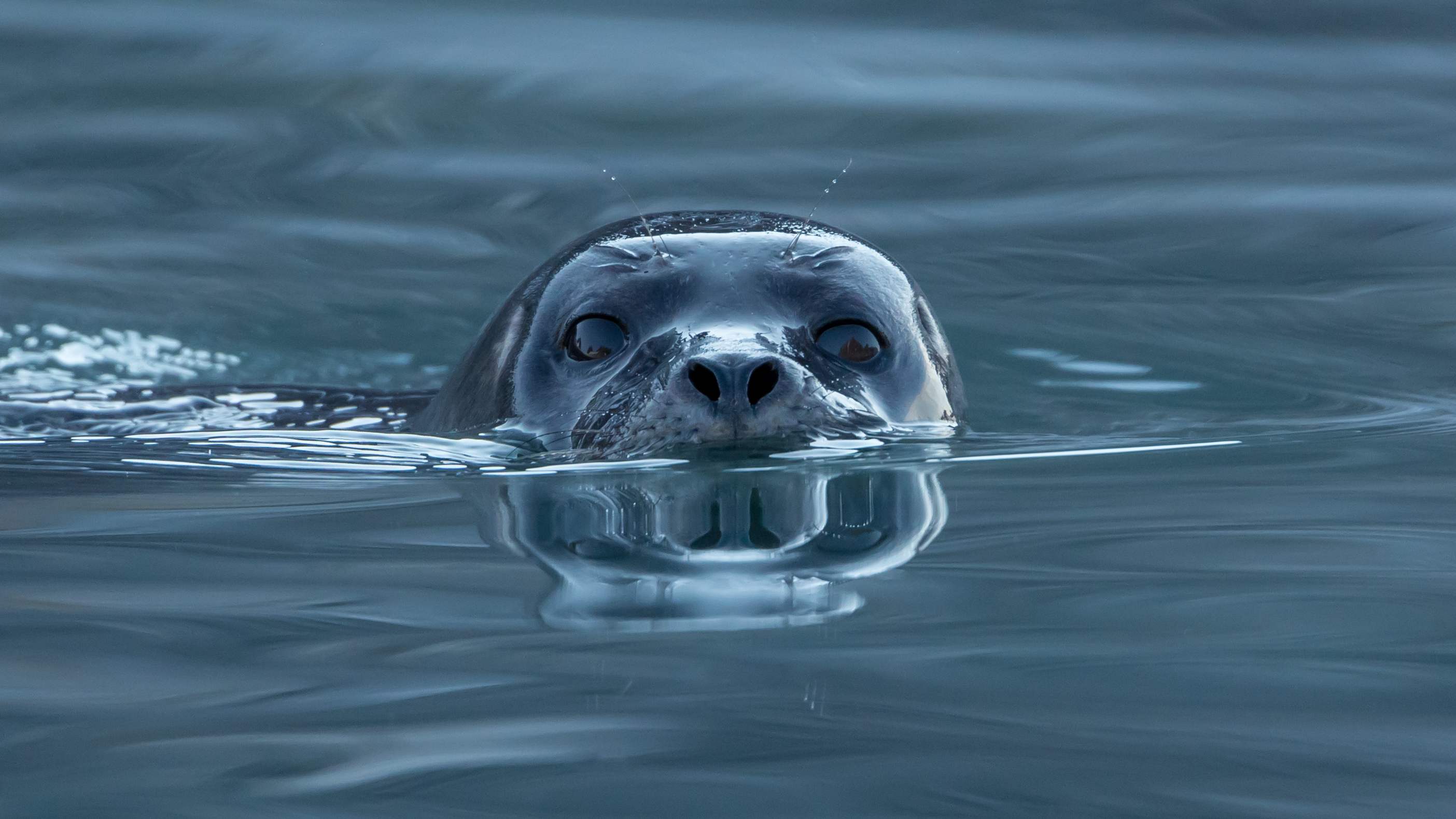
Harbor seal in Svalbard

As of 2020, however, the seals have returned. They never were extirpated from Canada and certain pockets of the Maine coast, and thus an important mother population was created from whence the species could reclaim the home of their ancestors. Currently, they are sighted as far south as the barrier islands of North Carolina on a regular basis, with Massachusetts being the southernmost point of known pupping areas along the Atlantic Coast. Harbor seals move south from eastern Canadian waters to breed along the coast of Maine, Cape Cod, and the South Shore in Massachusetts in May and June, and return northward in fall. Others will head south from these areas to "vacation" in warmer waters, particularly young seals unable to compete with adults for food and territory; they do not return north until spring.

One park ranger in New York City, which is in the centre of its West Atlantic range, says that "New York is like their Miami resort". This refers to the habit of young seals leaving Cape Cod and even some Arctic waters to inhabit the harbor in winter. In 2018 the New York Post reported that the harbor is now "cleaner than it has been in 110 years", and since the first decade of the 21st century, the harbor seal has found the old turf of its ancestors to be a land of plenty and the water to be livable. Within sight of the New York skyline, known colonies of harbor seals are found on Hoffman and Swinburne Islands as well as portions of Red Hook and Staten Island, readily hauling out from October until very early May. Known favourite foods of the seal are returning in grand numbers to New York Harbor as well as nearby New Jersey, from Raritan Bay all the way down the entire Jersey Shore, with schools of mossbunker regularly attracting harbor seals, their cousins the grey seals, dolphins and, most recently, whales. Both the northern and southern shores of Long Island have a reliable population of harbor seals as well as greys, where they will take sand lance as well as some species of crab as part of their diet.

== Habitat and diet ==
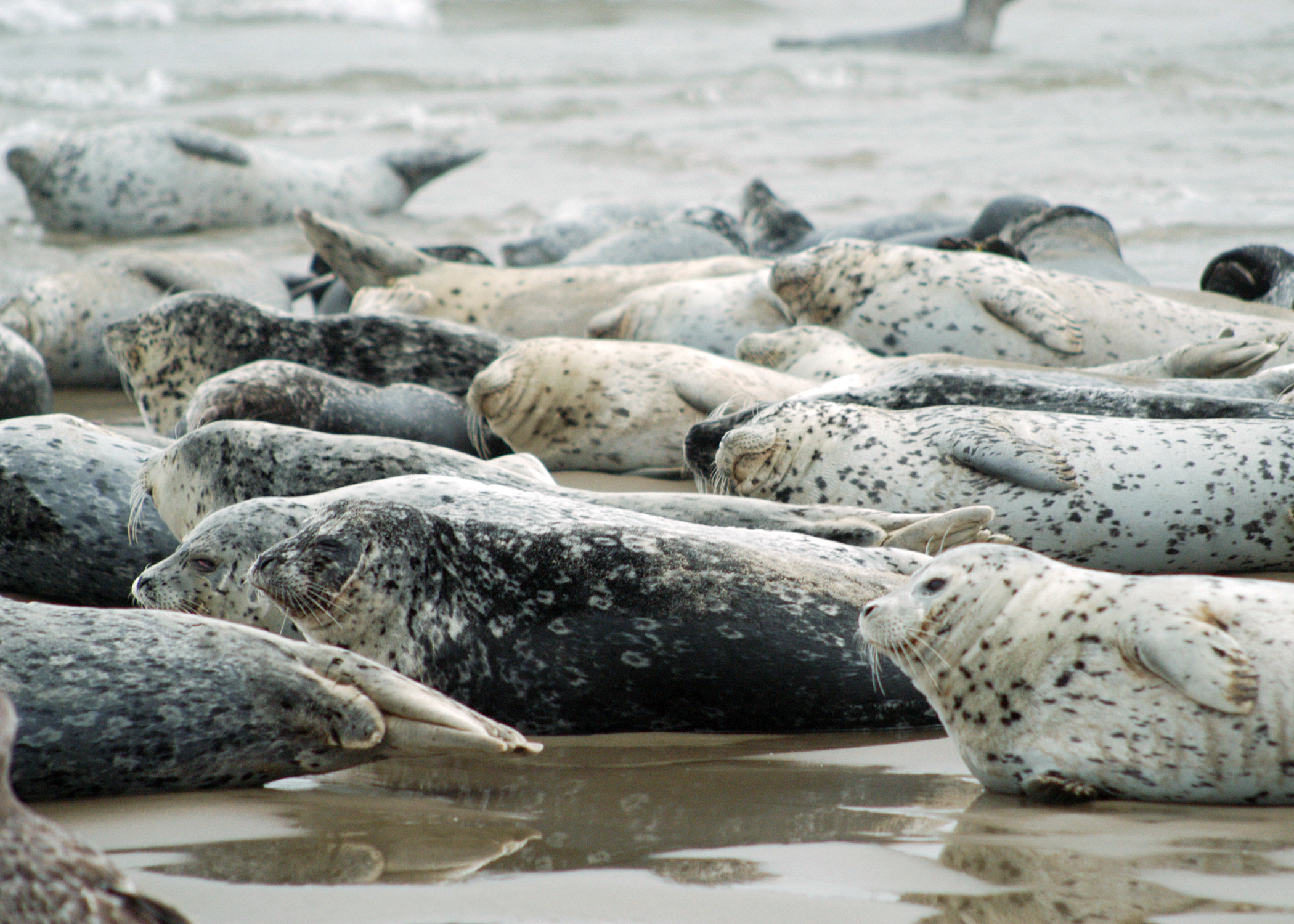
Harbor seals at Alsea Bay, Oregon

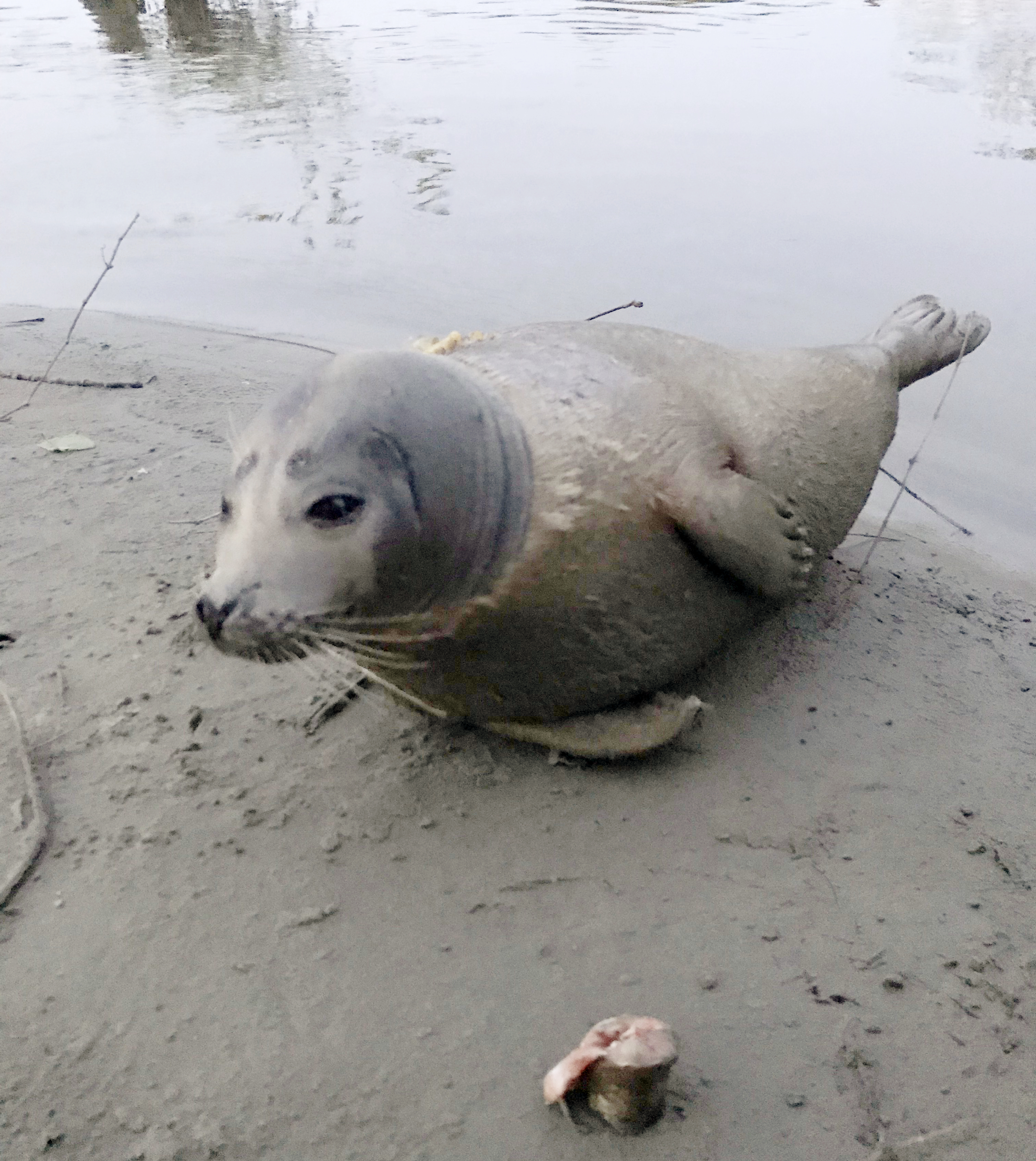
Harbor seal in the freshwater Connecticut River, following the shad run

Harbor seals prefer to frequent familiar resting sites. They may spend several days at sea and travel up to 50 km in search of feeding grounds, and will also swim more than a hundred miles upstream into fresh water in large rivers in search of migratory fish like shad and salmon. Resting sites may be both rugged, rocky coasts, such as those of the Hebrides or the shorelines of New England, or sandy beaches, like the ones that flank Normandy in Northern France or the Outer Banks of North Carolina. Harbor seals frequently congregate in harbours, bays, sandy intertidal zones, and estuaries in pursuit of prey fish such as salmon, menhaden, anchovy, sea bass, herring, mackerel, hake, cod, whiting and flatfish, and occasionally shrimp, crabs, mollusks, octopus, and squid. Atlantic subspecies of either Europe or North America also exploit deeper-dwelling fish of the genus Ammodytes as a food source and Pacific subspecies have been recorded occasionally consuming fish of the genus Oncorhynchus. Although primarily coastal, dives of over 500 m have been recorded. Harbor seals have been recorded to attack, kill and eat several kinds of ducks.

== Behaviour, survival, and reproduction ==
A harbor seal at SeaWorld San Diego

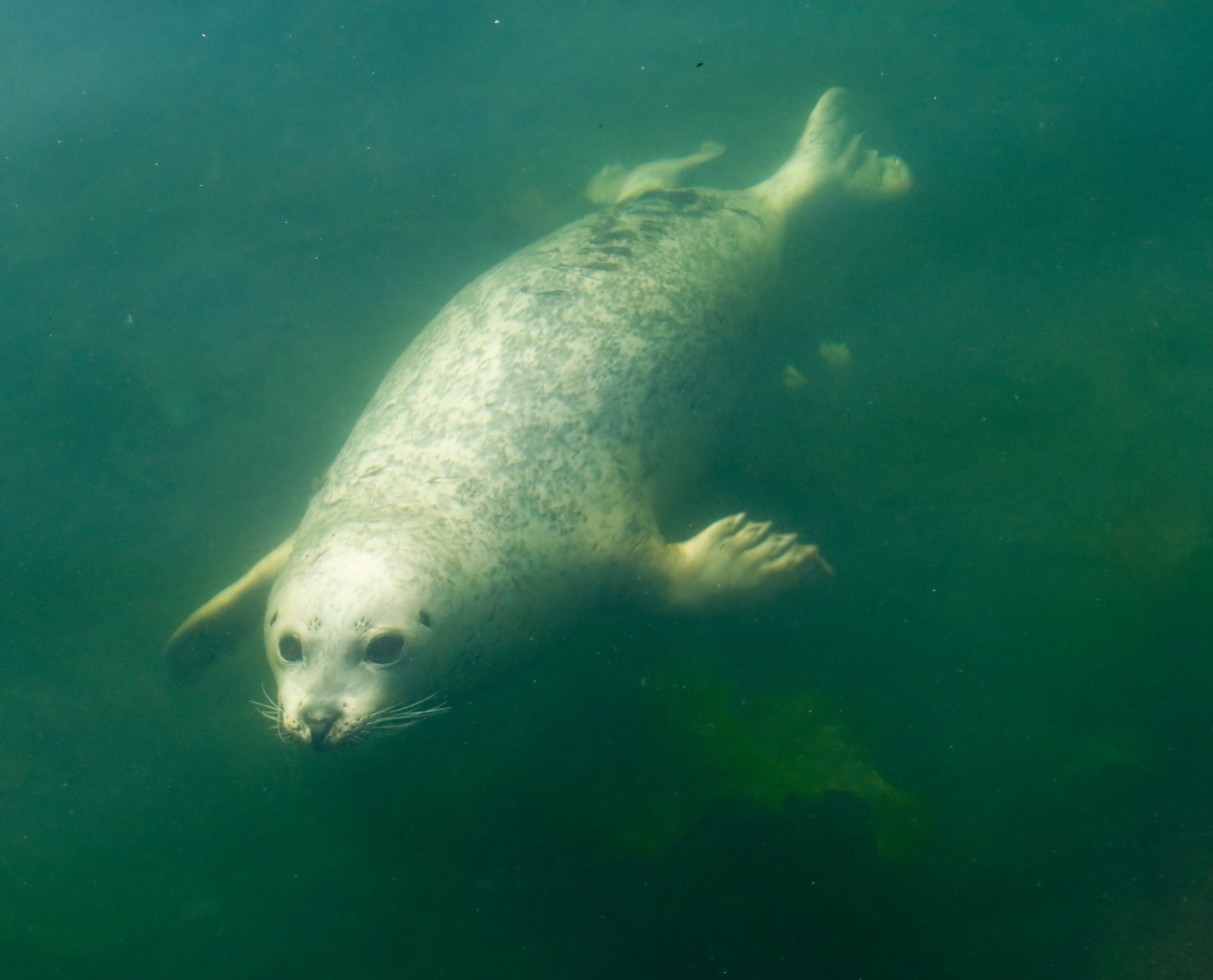
Harbor seal swimming

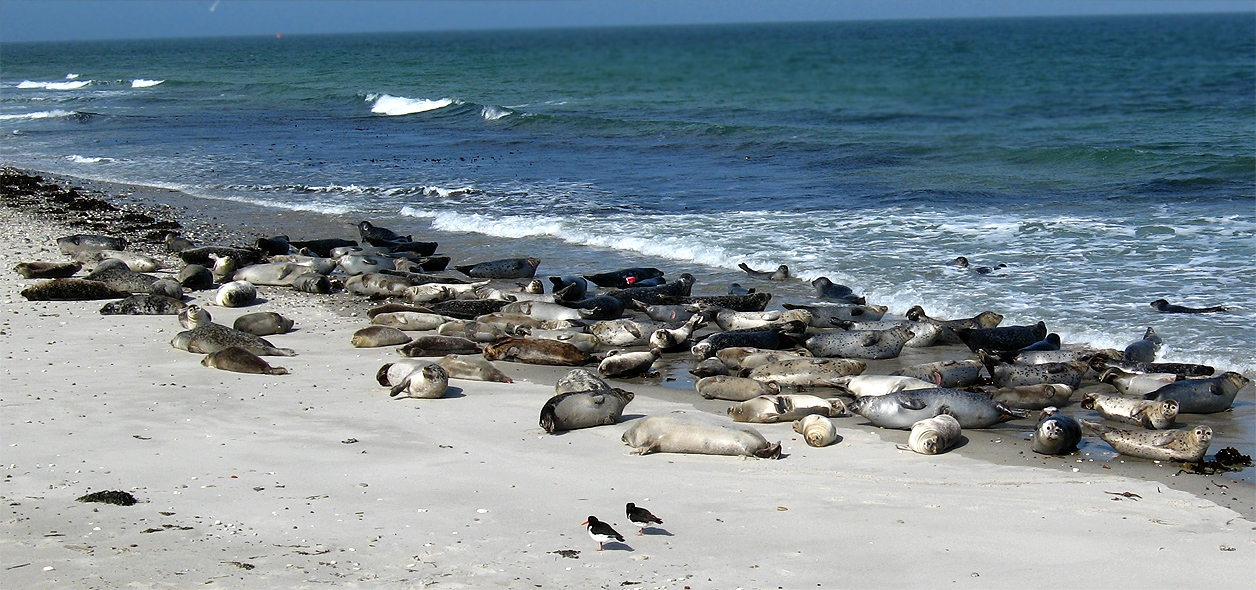
Harbor seal colony in Helgoland, Germany

Harbor seals are solitary, but are gregarious when hauled out and during the breeding season, though they do not form groups as large as some other seals. When not actively feeding, they haul to rest. They tend to be coastal, not venturing more than 20 km offshore. The mating system is not known, but thought to be polygamous. Females give birth once per year, with a gestation period around nine months. Females have a mean age at sexual maturity of 3.72 years and a mean age at first parturition of 4.64. Both courtship and mating occur under water. Researchers have found males gather under water, turn on their backs, put their heads together, and call to attract females ready for breeding. Pregnancy rate of females is 92% from age 3 to age 36, with lowered reproductive success after the age of 25 years.

Birthing of pups occurs annually on shore. The timing of the pupping season varies with location, occurring in February for populations in lower latitudes, and as late as July in the subarctic zone. The mothers are the sole providers of care, with lactation lasting 24 days. The single pups are born well developed, capable of swimming and diving within hours. Suckling for three to four weeks, pups feed on the mother's rich, fatty milk and grow rapidly; born weighing up to 16 kg, the pups may double their weight by the time of weaning.

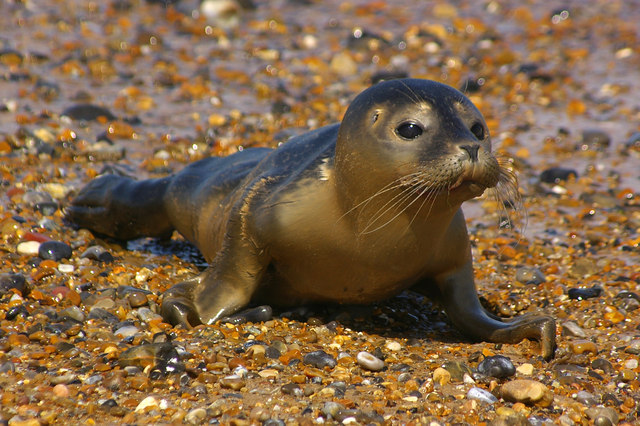
A pup

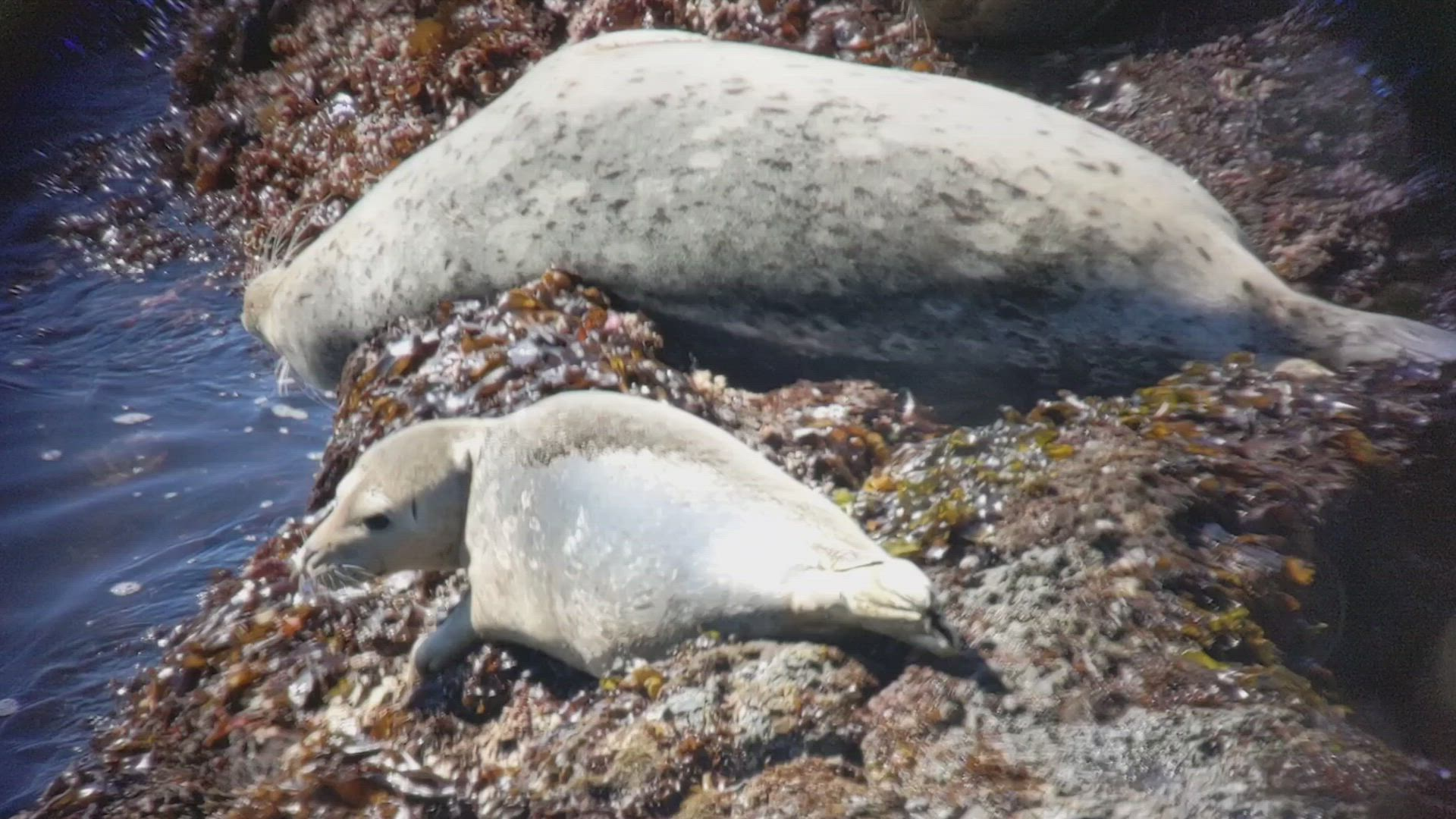
Mother and pup resting at Yaquina Head Outstanding Natural Area in Oregon.

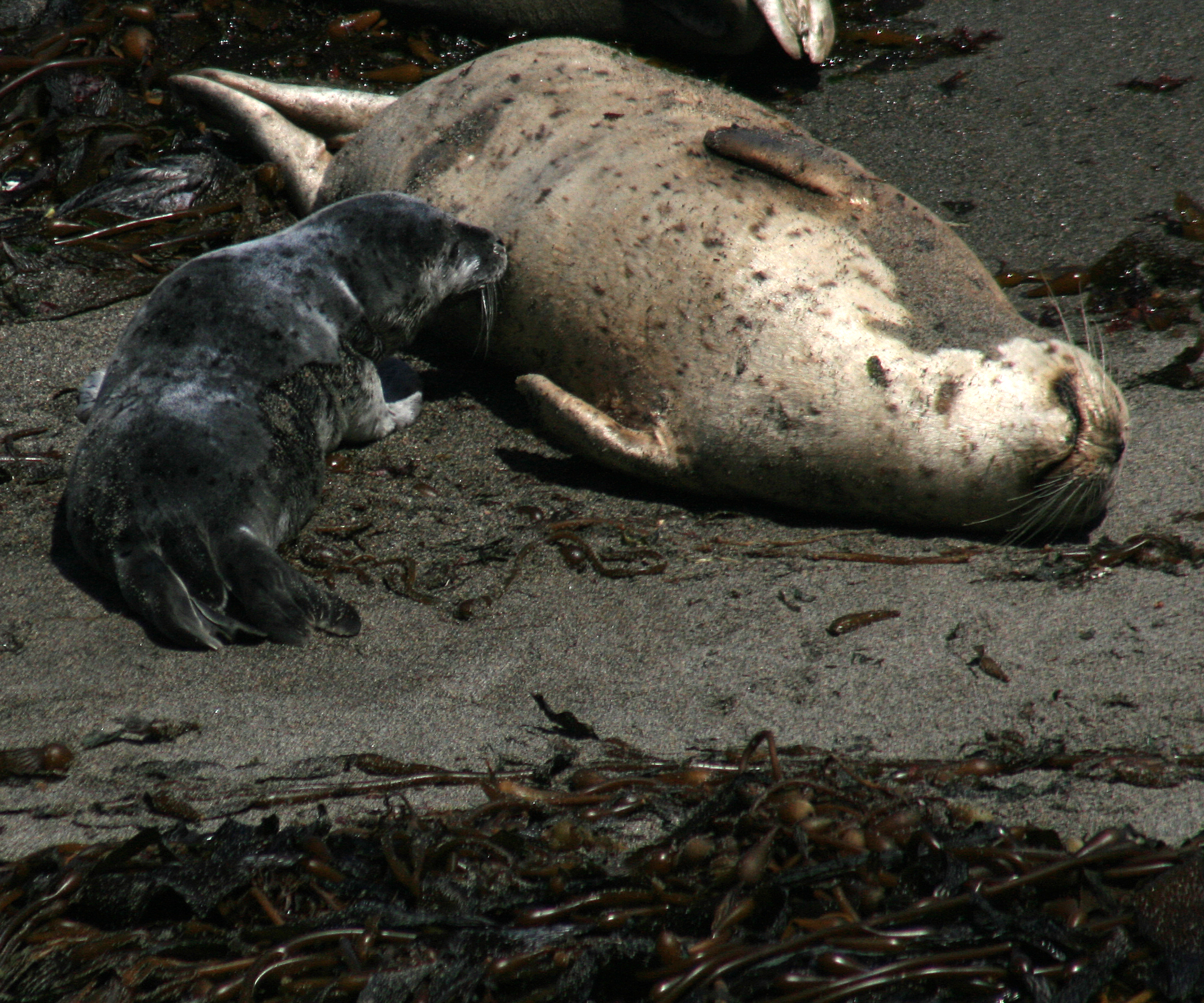
Pup nursing at Point Lobos in California.

Harbor seals must spend a great deal of time on shore when molting, which occurs shortly after breeding. This onshore time is important to the life cycle, and can be disturbed when substantial human presence occurs. The timing of onset of molt depends on the age and sex of the animal, with yearlings molting first and adult males last. A female mates again immediately following the weaning of her pup. Harbor seals are sometimes reluctant to haul out in the presence of humans, so shoreline development and access must be carefully studied, and if necessary managed, in known locations of seal haul out.

In comparison to many pinniped species, and in contrast to otariid pinnipeds, harbor seals are generally regarded to be more vocally reticent. However, they do use non-harmonic vocalisations to maintain breeding territories and to attract mates during specified times of year, and also during mother and pup interactions. In a post-mortem diffusion brain imaging analysis of vocal control circuits in pinnipeds, harbor seal brains demonstrated greater evidence of neural adaptation for vocal production learning than other pinnipeds and terrestrial carnivores.

Annual survival rates were calculated at 0.91 for adult males, and 0.902 for adult females. Maximum age for females is 36 and for males 31 years.

== Notable individuals ==
- Andre, rescued and trained by his owner Harry Goodridge, he became an iconic figure in his hometown of Rockport, Maine.
- Hoover, also rescued from a Maine harbor. Hoover became famous for his ability to imitate human speech, something not observed in any other mammal.
- Popeye, the official seal of Friday Harbor, Washington, notable for her common sightings up until 2019, when she was presumed to have died. She was identified and named from her cloudy left eye. There is a statue of her in the Port of Friday Harbor.
- Freddie, a seal pup commonly spotted along the Thames in central London. Named after Freddie Mercury due to his bushy whiskers and playfulness. Freddie was known to travel unusually far into London from the Thames Estuary, and was often sighted as far west as Hammersmith. On 21 March 2021 he had to be put down after he was violently mauled by an out-of-control dog.

== See also ==
- Conservation of Seals Act 1970 (in the UK)
- Marine Mammal Protection Act (in the United States)
- Wadden Sea Agreement (in the Netherlands, Germany and Denmark)
