= Andre (film) =

- Theatrical release poster
- Directed by: George T. Miller
- Screenplay by: Dana Baratta
- Based on: A Seal Called Andre by: Harry Goodridge; Lew Dietz
- Produced by: Annette Handley; Adam Shapiro
- Starring: Keith Carradine; Tina Majorino; Keith Szarabajka; Chelsea Field
- Cinematography: Thomas Burstyn
- Edited by: Harry Hitner
- Music by: Bruce Rowland
- Production company: The Kushner-Locke Company
- Distributed by: Paramount Pictures (North America); Turner Pictures Worldwide (International)
- Release date: August 19, 1994
- Running time: 95 minutes
- Country: United States
- Language: English
- Budget: $8 million
- Box office: $16,820,893

Andre is a 1994 American comedy-drama film directed by George T. Miller and starring Tina Majorino about a child's encounter with a sea lion. It is based on the 1975 book A Seal Called Andre, which in turn was based on a true story. It was shot in Vancouver and Mississippi.

== Plot ==
In 1962 in Rockport, Maine, a seal drowns in a fishing net cast by financially struggling fisherman Billy Baker, much to his fury. He and the other local fishermen discuss shooting the seals as a way to improve their flagging fishing season. Toni Whitney, a seven-year-old girl, and her family subsequently adopt the seal's orphaned newborn pup, naming it Andre. The vet doesn't hold out much hope, but Toni incites him to survive, with the promise that she will be his best friend forever, and that she will always take care of him. After several failed attempts to get him to take a bottle, Toni's father, Harry, the harbor master, constructs an "artificial mother" for him out of wetsuit material, a bucket, and two feeding bottles, which he finally accepts, ensuring his survival.

As Andre grows up, Toni forms an inseparable bond with him, even taking him to school for show and tell, with the help of Harry and the permission of her teacher. He becomes attached to the Whitneys, and especially to Toni. He lives in the harbor, learns tricks, and attracts a huge local following of fans. The irony of his success as an entertainer further angers Billy, who becomes increasingly jealous of Andre's and the Whitneys' success and esteem within the village. Relations between Harry and Billy deteriorate rapidly. Meanwhile, Billy's son, Mark, and Toni's sister, Paula, become romantically involved, increasing tension between Paula and Harry over Andre. Mark and Billy have a strained relationship as it is. Under pressure from his family and the locals, Harry reluctantly makes the decision to release Andre into the wild once he is weaned, but reconsiders and does not go through with it when he encounters the body of a seal covered in bullet holes at the place where he had planned to release him.

In his first winter, Andre escapes the confines of the barn, and the water home that Harry built for him when the harbor froze over. He cuts himself badly, leaving a trail of blood which the Whitneys discover upon realizing that he is missing, and remains gone for the winter. However, he returns in spring, physically weak but unchanged in character, and recovers quickly from his ordeal.

As Andre gets older, he continues to be scapegoat for the local fishermen, and for Paula, as he takes up more and more of Harry's time and affections. He misses her performance (which he told her he would not miss for the world) in the local Miss Liberty beauty pageant, because he has to protect Andre from a drunken Billy, who is trying to kill him with a pitchfork. Harry's relations with his son, Steve, fade into the background as he comes down harshly on him for minor transgressions, and fails to keep up with what is going on in his life. When Paula and Mark are discovered smoking in the shed when Andre exits it in a fit of coughing, Harry permanently bans Mark's presence on the Whitneys' grounds, and cutting off their relationship after grounding Paula. Furious about this, she decides to leave home, raging that Harry doesn't care about her, and that she hates him, to the anger and deep concern of her mother, Thalice. Mark tells her he knows a way to make Andre go away so that he'll never come back.

Harry's job also suffers. He fails to call meetings, never checks moorings, and his relations with the fishermen become ever more strained. He also attracts the ongoing attention of the federal government, who send their inspector, Jack Adams, to inform him that he is violating the law by keeping a wild animal in captivity, as a pet. He insists that Andre is there by his own choice, but that it's too dangerous in the wild during winter. Jack pays two visits to the Whitneys' home, increasingly emphatic that Harry faces court and even jail if he does not give Andre up. However, Andre is teaching him about the intelligence and abilities of seals, and despite the risks, he is determined that nothing will put an end to this learning curve. At one point Andre saves his life when he is underwater checking a mooring, which turns out to be entangled in an active explosive.

Eventually, Thalice manages to impress upon Harry the high cost of continuing his relations with Andre in the setup that they have, and he agrees to call Jack, so that he can relocate Andre to the aquarium in Boston, where he will be safe, cared for, and have plenty of company. However, before he can tell Toni, the telephone rings, and she goes down to the harbor. There she discovers that Paula and Mark have taken Andre, commandeered a boat, and are heading out to sea as dark clouds gather. Steve is charged with keeping an eye on Toni while their parents investigate, but he is engrossed in a TV program, and does not notice her slip out and launch the dinghy onto an increasingly choppy sea.

On their boat, Mark attempts to shoot Andre, reasoning that he is a problem for the fishermen, but Paula finally realizes that she cares about Andre and doesn't want him to be harmed. She tries to stop Mark from shooting him, but the gun fires. Andre jumps overboard, but Paula, not seeing this, assumes his body has fallen in. Very upset and angry at Mark, she demands to be taken home. Harry and Thalice, having been informed by Toni that Paula and Mark had taken Andre, meet them on the shore. Steve, in a panic, arrives and tells Thalice that Toni has disappeared, as has the dinghy. She calls the coast guard, as the rain starts to fall, and visibility begins to deteriorate.

Out at sea, Toni is struggling to maintain control of the dinghy in the face of the storm and a strong outward tide-rush. The dinghy is being tossed on huge waves, in opaque rain, and is heading towards some jagged rocks. She loses both oars, and, panicking, calls out for help. Andre, who turns out to be unharmed, swims to her rescue, pulling her away from the rocks by the dinghy's mooring rope. He then alerts Billy and Harry in their boat, leading them to Toni's location. Before she can be rescued, a large wave capsizes the dinghy. Mark, who came with Billy and Harry, jumps overboard, swims out to her, and Billy throws them both a lifebelt, pulling them to safety. Billy tells Mark that he is proud of him, while Harry comforts Toni in the back of the boat, and Andre swims away, exultant at her safety.

Once back on shore, Toni is distraught to find Jack levering a caged Andre onto a transport vehicle. Harry explains to her that Andre is going to live in the aquarium in Boston, where he will be safe and cared for in ways they can't. Annie Potts, an aquarium worker, tells Toni they will take good care of him, that they will love having him there, and that she will get to visit him whenever she wants. She reluctantly accepts the notion, and tells Andre that she loves him and will visit him all the time.

As summer comes around, Billy and Mark's relationship improves. Harry repairs relations with his family, and having been offered a research job in marine mammal protection, steps down as harbor master, nominating Billy to take his place. Toni comes to the realization that Andre would be happier in the wild, being a wild animal, and he is subsequently released. The Whitneys do not expect to see him again, and Toni wonders if he is making new friends with the wild seals. Multiple alleged sightings of Andre are reported, until a friend of the Whitneys spots him nearby, and informs them that he is on his way. The entire town of Rockport flocks to the harbor to watch him returning home to his family. The film ends with an adult Toni narrating that his life became legend after he made his first trip home, that he spent every winter at the aquarium, and every spring he was released to swim home to Rockport. She narrates that by the time he was twenty-four years old he could hardly see, but still made his final trip home, and that in all her past and future, she'll never have a better friend than him.

== Cast ==
- Tina Majorino as Toni Whitney
- Keith Carradine as Harry Whitney
- Chelsea Field as Thalice Whitney
- Aidan Pendleton as Paula Whitney
- Shane Meier as Steve Whitney
- Keith Szarabajka as Billy Baker
- Joshua Jackson as Mark Baker
- Shirley Broderick as Mrs. McCann
- Andrea Libman as Mary May
- Joy Coghill as Betsy
- Gregory Edward Smith as Bobby
- Tory as Andre, based on the real seal Andre the Seal
- Jay Brazeau as Griff Armstrong
- Annette O'Toole as Adult Toni (voice)

== Production ==
The film is based on the 1975 book A Seal Called Andre, co-written by the seal's owner, Harry Goodridge, and Lew Dietz, which describes the true story of Andre.

The location, approximate dates, first names, ages and occupations of the real family members are all preserved, although two of the Goodridge children, Carol and Susan, are not depicted in the film. Andre really did perform tricks for people down at the harbour, becoming a celebrity. He was free to come and go from the home to the sea as he pleased, though he had a floating pound and an old bathtub in the family's barn. Billy Baker is a composite character, drawing together a minority of fishermen who used seals as scapegoats for poor catches. The book tells of one such fisherman, named only as he within the text, who became angry with Andre, and who wanted to shoot him, but was quickly talked out of it. Andre really was nursed with an "artificial mother", of the kind depicted in the film, and he did go missing in his first winter, returning in the spring. The storm scene appears to have been added for cinematic and plot reasons, as do many of the subplots and supporting characters. The case really was investigated by the federals in conjunction with a law which prohibited the keeping of wild animals - but this happened later in Andre's life than the film depicts, and the case was quickly dropped on the grounds that Andre had been kept before the law came into play; that is, it was demonstrably his own intention to come home and to remain with the family.

During the closing credits, shots from original 16 mm films of the real Andre are shown. He, who spent every winter in the New England Aquarium in Boston, entertained tourists in Rockport every summer, having swum up there upon his release each spring, until his death in the spring of 1986.

In the film, Andre is not played by an actual seal, but rather by a sea lion named Tory. Two others named Kalika and PJ were also featured in it.

It features the Vancouver Aquarium in Stanley Park.

The theme song from the film "Thanks to You", sung by Tyler Collins, was a top 20 hit on the Billboard Adult Contemporary charts upon its release.

== Reception ==
Rotten Tomatoes gives Andre a 43% approval rating with an average rating of 5.6/10, based on 21 reviews.

=== Box office ===
The film debuted at No. 10.

== Score ==
Original Motion Picture Score. All tracks composed by Bruce Rowland

Original tracklist
| No. | Title | Length |
|---|---|---|
| 1. | "Seal Ballet" | 2:48 |
| 2. | "An Orphan Pup" | 2:02 |
| 3. | "Toni Meets Andre" | 2:43 |
| 4. | "Let's Call Him Andre" | 2:19 |
| 5. | "Andre's First Swim" | 1:13 |
| 6. | "The Coat Button" | 2:36 |
| 7. | "Winter in the Barn" | 2:13 |
| 8. | "The Storm" | 6:23 |
| 9. | "Off to the Aquarium" | 1:40 |
| 10. | "T. N. T." | 1:20 |
| 11. | "Halloween" | 1:18 |
| 12. | "Let Nature Take Its Course" | 1:40 |
| 13. | "Robinson's Rock" | 2:20 |
| 14. | "Butterflies Are Free" | 0:57 |
| 15. | "Back to the Wild" | 1:11 |
| 16. | "Dad" | 1:28 |
| 17. | "Frogman Dad" | 0:25 |
| 18. | "How Can I Make It Up To You" | 1:25 |
| 19. | "An Attempt On Andre's Life" | 1:27 |
| 20. | "He's On His Way" | 2:41 |
| 21. | "Welcome Home" | 0:53 |
| 22. | "Thanks to You" | 3:22 |
| Total length: | | 52:34 |

== Songs ==
The film includes Thanks to You by Tyler Collins.
