= Glen Cove Christian Academy =

Coordinates: 44.1290°N 69.0789°W

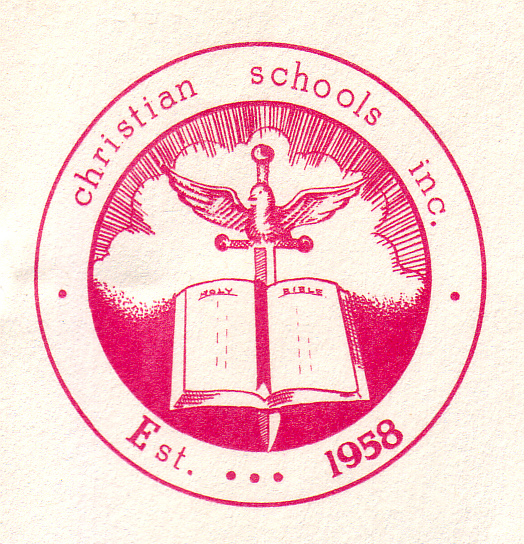
- Glen Cove, Maine; United States

Information
- Type: Private Christian Secondary School
- Religious affiliation: Non-denominational
- Opened: September 8, 1958
- Closed: September 1979
- President: Harold Duff
- Grades: 9-12
- Campus size: 64 acres
- Campus type: Residential
- Colors: Crimson and White
- Team name: Warriors
- Yearbook: Torch
- Website: http://gccagcbc.org

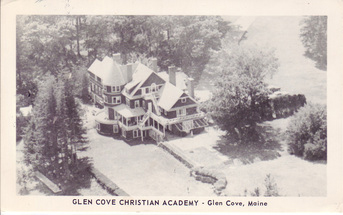
Glen Cove Christian Academy

Glen Cove Christian Academy was a private, non-denominational, Christian boarding and day school for grades nine through twelve. The school was founded in 1958 in Glen Cove, Maine under the leadership of Harold Duff and Arthur Fish. The school was forced to close its doors in 1979.

== Activities ==
The academy fielded a variety of interscholastic sports teams. They were active participants in the State Principal's Association sports leagues as a Class S school. Girls teams included basketball, softball, and volleyball teams. Boys teams included cross country, soccer, basketball, baseball, and volleyball. The boys basketball team reached Class S/D state tournament status in 1964, 1965, and 1976. In 1969, the boys varsity basketball team won the Western Maine Class D Runner-up trophy. In 1977, the boys team won the Western Maine Class D title, but lost to Eastern Maine champs, Jonesport-Beals in the Class D State Championship contest. In 1978 newspapers carried the story of the boys team's matchup against Oak Grove-Coburn in the Western Maine Semifinals, but did not refer to their loss which allowed Coburn to move on to the next level of competition.

The schools provided several musical opportunities for students. School choirs, quartets, trios and vocal ensembles performed locally and traveled to churches, schools, and conferences throughout the Northeast United States. There was an active drama program at the school, and students were also active in the local chapter of the National Honor Society and the Daughters of the American Revolution.

== History ==
The school opened in 1958 with 40 students and met in Pittsfield, Maine, with half the students boarding and half as day students. It began to investigate the Warrenton estate in the Glen Cove section of Rockport near Rockland Maine in 1959. The estate consisted of sixty-seven acres of land with 2500 feet of ocean front and a main house of thirty-five rooms and ten baths, a carriage house and an outlying barn, all in good condition. The property had recently been used by the Round Table Foundation, a research organization, and had been vacant for two years. The foundation allowed the school to occupy and use the property pending the settling of the title. This was accomplished a year later on September 28, 1960, and the school was known as Glen Cove Christian High School. Two years later it graduated its first class as the Glen Cove Christian Academy.

== Founding President ==
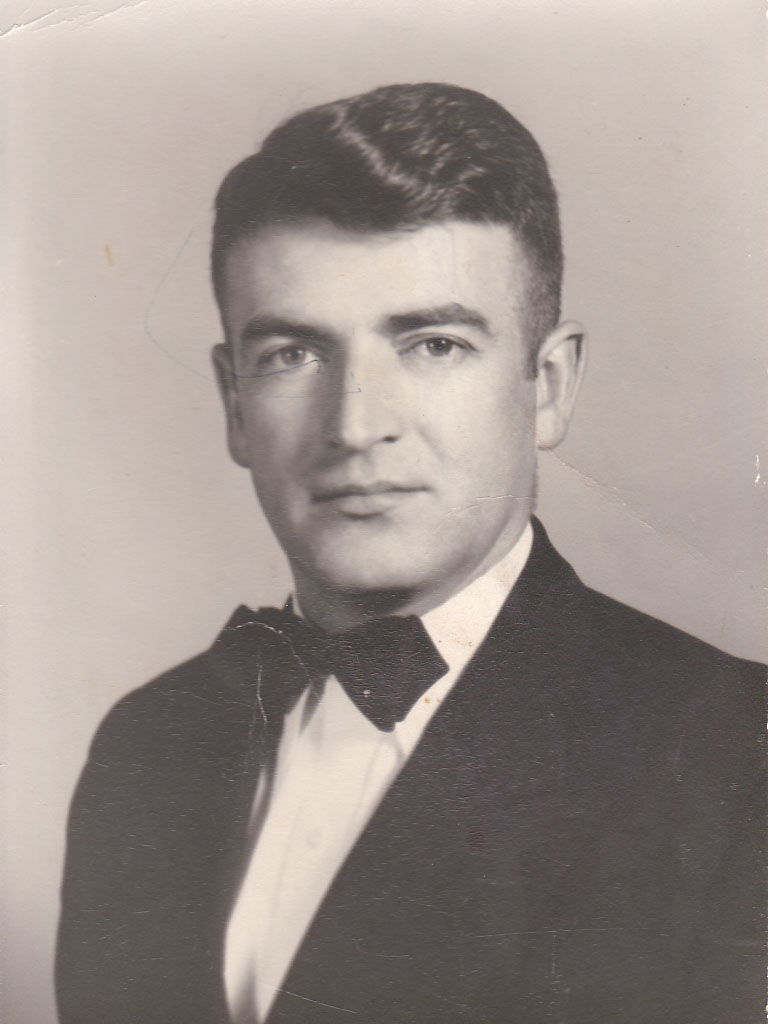
Harold Duff

Harold Cameron Duff was born in 1922 in Hodgdon, Maine, to a farmer named Maurice Duff and his wife, who had been born Ruth Barton. In 1930 he was living with his parents and siblings on Smith Road in the township named Hogdgon Town. Ten years later he was living in the same township as one of his parents' ten children. He attended Bob Jones University from 1948 to 1952 and in that year he was listed as a student in the graduate school. After graduation, Duff taught at New Brunswick Bible Institute in Victoria, New Brunswick, Canada for six years before being called upon to help establish a new Christian high school in central Maine. On April 3, 1976, Duff and his wife spoke at a conference at a church in Greenfield, Maine. A year later he had left Christian Schools, Inc. and was traveling and speaking around Massachusetts. By September of that year he was headmaster of the Pioneer Valley Christian Academy in East Longmeadow, Massachusetts.

== Alumni of Note ==
Donna Loring, Tribal Representative of the Penobscot Nation in the state of Maine.

== Glen Cove Bible College ==
By 1962 a post-secondary academic body, the Glen Cove Bible School, had come into existence alongside the high school.

In 1973, Governor Kenneth Curtis signed into law an act naming Glen Cove Bible School the Glen Cove Bible College, allowing it to award Baccalaureate degrees for the first time in its 13-year existence. The school had offered both a three-year core course of study and a four-year collegiate course of study.

== Christian Schools, Inc. ==
Christian Schools, Inc.,the umbrella organization which oversaw the Glen Cove Christian Academy, was founded in 1958 as an interdenominational organization to establish schools of christian education in various subjects. It also included a Christian elementary school in Canaan, Maine, Glen Cove and Bible School in Glen Cove, Maine, and was instrumental in the founding of Dublin Christian Academy, in Dublin, New Hampshire. President of Christian Schools, Inc., Harold Duff, was also called upon by parent groups across New England to consult on prospects for establishing Christian schools in other locations.

== History of the Warrenton Estate ==
The land that became Warrenton Park was purchased by George Warren Smith in 1884. By 1889 Benjamin Franklin Smith was preparing to build a large two-story cottage there. George Warren Smith spent his last days in his home there and died at the age of 97 in 1922. Clifford Lodge, the home Benjamin F. Smith built, burned in 1940. Owned by Gwendolyn Sharpe at the time, it had just undergone a $30,000 renovation. The fire, of undetermined origin, began in the maids quarters of the unoccupied building.

=== The Round Table Foundation ===
In 1950, a portion of the Warrenton estate was purchased by The Round Table Foundation. The purchase was made by Dr. Henry K. Andrija Puharich to conduct experiments in "taste physiology".
