= Tim Lawson =

Tim Lawson may refer to:

- Tim Lawson (writer) (born 1961), American writer and musician
- Tim C. Lawson, United States Army major general
- T. Allen Lawson (born 1963), American painter
- Timothy Lawson (born 1943), British Olympic hockey player
