= Lew Dietz =

American writer

Lew Dietz (22 May 1906 – 27 April 1997) was an American writer, much of whose work centered on his native Maine. In a long career he produced 20 books and hundreds of magazine articles for Down East magazine (which he helped establish), True, Yankee, Redbook, Coast Fisherman and Outdoors Maine among others.

Dietz was born in Pittsburgh and graduated from New York University, but he lived much of his life in and near Rockport, Maine. In his youth, he was a foreign correspondent in Paris and a copywriter in New York.

Perhaps his best known work (with Harry Goodridge) was A Seal Called Andre, based on the true story of an orphaned baby seal that learned to perform tricks and became a popular tourist attraction in Rockport. The 1975 book remains in print; the book was the source for the film Andre (1995).

He was also well known for the Jeff White books, young adult novels on outdoor themes:

- Jeff White, Young Guide (1951)
- Jeff White, Young Lumberjack (1952)
- Jeff White, Young Trapper (1951)
- Jeff White, Young Woodsman (1949)

Other books included The Story of Boothbay (1937), Camden Hills. An Informal History of the Camden-Rockport Region (1947), The Allagash, (1968, 1978, 2001), originally published as part of the Rivers of America Series); Touch of Wildness A Maine Woods Journal (1970); Pines for the King's Navy, (1955), concerning the struggle among settlers, Indians, and the British king for Maine's timber, and Full Fathom Five (1958), illustrated by his wife, the artist Denny Winter. Other juvenile titles, all with Maine settings, are Wilderness River (1961) and The Savage Summer (1964), also illustrated by Denny Winter.

The Year of the Big Cat (1970) was adapted into a 1974 television movie on The Wonderful World of Disney called "Return of the Big Cat" and starred Ted Gehring and Kim Richards.

In 1977 Dietz wrote the text for Night Train at Wiscasset Station: An Unforgettable Portrait of Maine and Its People, a Maine classic. Reissued in 1998, the book combines Dietz's words with Kosti Ruohomaa's (1914–1961) black and white photographs of ordinary rural and fishing industry Mainers.

Dietz died at the age of 90 at a hospital in Rockport, Maine.
