= Bay Chamber Concerts =

Non-profit organization in downtown Rockport, Maine

Bay Chamber Concerts is a non-profit organization located in Camden, Maine. The organization plays a principal role in bringing music, particularly classical music, to the Midcoast area. During the months of July and August Bay Chamber Concerts hosts a Summer Music Festival bringing an assortment of musical groups to the Rockport Opera House and surrounding venues. In addition, from September to June, Bay Chamber brings various performers to the Camden, Rockport and Rockland area through its Performing Arts Series. Bay Chamber Music School offers private instruction and group classes.

== History ==
=== Background ===
From 1930 to 1945 philanthropist Mary Louise Curtis hosted a summer music program in Rockport, through the auspices of the Curtis Institute of Music in Philadelphia. Illustrious musicians from all over the world came to Rockport to teach and to give concerts in a boat barn. Despite the summer music program's discontinuation in 1945, many musicians continued to come to the Rockport area with their students. As summer residents of Rockport since early childhood, and as alumni of the Curtis Institute, Thomas and Andrew Wolf viewed founding the Bay Chamber Concerts as a means of continuing Curtis' musical legacy.

=== Establishment ===
Andrew Wolf, pianist, and flutist Thomas Wolf founded Bay Chamber Concerts as a summer chamber music festival in 1961. The teenage brothers, with the inspiration and financial assistance of Mrs. Mary Louise Curtis Zimbalist Bok, their grandmother, violinist Lea Luboshutz, and their uncle, opera impresario Boris Goldovsky, established Bay Chamber in an effort to revive a musical tradition begun by Mary Louise Curtis in 1930.

The early concerts, under the artistic direction of Thomas Wolf, were held in an Episcopal Church in Camden. At the same time, the Wolf brothers were instrumental in establishing the Fox Island Concerts on Vinalhaven, an island off the mid-coast of Maine. In 1970, Bay Chamber Concerts assisted in the founding of Machias, Maine Bay Chamber Concerts in a town 30 miles from the Canada–US border. Under Bay Chamber Concerts' auspices each summer, both locations continue to present numerous concerts.

Andrew Wolf became Bay Chamber Concerts' artistic director in 1963. During his tenure, the concerts were moved to the newly renovated Rockport Opera House effectively doubling the seating capacity to 400 and securing a venue with marvelous acoustics. In 1974, Bay Chamber Concerts became a year-round organization, presenting a mix-genre musical series during the fall, winter and spring. The Bay Chamber Music School was founded in 2011.

Following the death of Andrew Wolf in December 1985, Thomas Wolf took over once again as artistic director, and an endowment was created to underwrite a national music award in Andrew Wolf's memory. Upon his retirement in 2011, Manuel Bagorro took over as artistic director and Monica Kelly, as executive director.

In 1993, Bay Chamber Concerts, along with the Town of Rockport and private contributors, raised $1,000,000 to restore the Rockport Opera House, improving the auditorium, adding meeting rooms and its hospitality facilities. The Rockport Opera House remains an important venue for Bay Chamber Concerts. It now also uses the recently renovated (2005) 350-seat Strand Theatre in Rockland, the 500-seat Camden Opera House, the 800-seat Strom Auditorium in Rockport and the newly restored Union Hall, also in Rockport.

Bay Chamber Concerts is a 501(c)(3) registered non-profit organization.

=== Young Stars of Maine ===
The Young Stars of Maine awards the following six prizes to young Maine music students: the A.H. Chatfield, Jr. Piano Prize, the Jean and Harvey Picker Senior Prize (instrumental or vocal), the Elsie Bixler Junior Prize (instrumental), the Ezra Rachlin Fun with Music (instrumental or vocal), the Nathan E. Corning Jazz Prize (instrumental or vocal), and the Summer Music Strings Prize. Auditions are held for prospective prize winners. The Young Stars Prizes are awarded at a special concert, given by the audition winners at the Rockport Opera House.

== See also ==
- List of music festivals in the United States
