= Rockport Harbor =

Harbour in Rockport, Maine, United States

Coordinates: 44.177°N 69.07°W

Rockport Harbor is a bay in Rockport, Maine, in the United States of America.
