= Harry Goodridge =

American author

- Born: January 4, 1916; Massachusetts
- Died: April 6, 1990 (aged 74); Rockport, Maine
- Occupations: Author, scuba diver, tree surgeon, harbormaster
- Notable work: A Seal Called Andre

Harry Goodridge (January 4, 1916 – April 6, 1990) was an American harbormaster, professional scuba diver, tree surgeon and co-author of the book A Seal Called Andre: The Two Worlds of a Maine Harbor Seal.

== Life ==
Born in Massachusetts in 1916, Goodridge lived and worked in Rockport, Maine with his wife, Thalice Goodridge and their five children: a son and four daughters, Susan, Toni, Carol and Paula. Goodridge was well known in Rockport as a retired tree surgeon of 45 years.

As a salvage scuba diver, Goodridge fostered orphaned seal pups before releasing them back into the wild. Susan Goodridge recalls: “he’d raised two other seals before Andre, so it wasn’t totally new.” The Goodridge household was not unfamiliar to housing unusual pets. The children were accustomed to living with a seagull (Sam Segal), robin (Reuben), crows (Klinker and Columbus), pigeon (Walter), and even a bat, which Goodridge trained to eat flies from one's hand. One seal, named Basil, was featured in a Life Magazine story called “Skin Diver’s Best Friend.” Shortly after that, the seal was eaten by a shark on one of Goodridge's shark hunts. Thalice, Goodridge's wife, was very tolerant of her husband's affection for bringing wild animals back to their home. Susan Goodridge recalls, "Our mother’s deal with our father was that if he was going to bring any animal into the house, he had to clean up after it." Regarding Andre, Thalice said, "I did object to his going in the living room. You could say I'm a 'seal widow.'"

On May 16, 1961, Goodridge found his third orphaned seal pup which he named Andre, after Andre Cowan, a Tahitian trainer at Marineland. His intention for the seal was to train him to be his diving companion. Andre lived with the Goodridges for seven months out of the year, splashing in the bathtub, sledding down the hill to the harbor, and watching his favorite television program Flipper with the children.

Goodridge began to teach Andre to do tricks, which started to attract crowds at feeding time. Susan Goodridge recalls: “He did that for most of Andre’s whole life, for about 25 years. For seven months each year from April to October, Harry would go down there about 7 p.m. and get the show going. Later on, he moved back to about 4:30 p.m.” Tricks included dancing the twist, shooting basketballs, jumping through a motorcycle tire, blowing a horn, and towing a dinghy while playing dead. According to Goodridge, there were two types of hoop tricks Andre could perform: “graceful” and “clumsy”. “People came from all over the world, really,” Goodridge said. “There was never a sign saying what time the show was. People just knew.”

Goodridge kept Andre in a "floating tent" in the Rockport Harbor during the summer while performing his tricks for an estimated 25,000 gathered spectators. The seal was allowed his freedom during the winter months between November and March, but due to his habitual nature of causing havoc with area fishermen and their boats, in 1973 when Andre was 12 years old, Goodridge decided to transport him to aquariums in Boston and Connecticut for the winter months. In April, Goodridge would travel back down and see Andre off on his swim back up the coast to Rockport harbor. Sometimes it would take Andre as few as three days to make the journey, while other years it would take as long as six days.

The NBC reality television series Real People featured a segment where host George Schlatter interviewed Goodridge and documented Andre's annual release from the aquarium and his 200 plus mile journey to Rockport harbor.

In 1979, Maine Governor Joseph E. Brennan complained to the Maine Associated Press that Goodridge and Andre were receiving too much publicity. The statement received such public backlash that Brennan was forced to release a formal apology during his 1982 re-election campaign. "I consider Andre a supporter," Brennan said. "And I found out that if you don’t give Andre his just priority, it will come home to get you." The Goodridges' youngest daughter, Toni, requested Andre be the ring bearer at their wedding in 1981. "The minister really questioned us about that," Toni said, "He made us fill out a psychological questionnaire before he would marry us."

Goodridge teamed up with American writer Lew Dietz to write a book about his life with Andre the seal. It was published by Down East Books in 1975 and has remained in print ever since. Goodridge did not charge spectators to watch Andre perform. He did pass a fish bucket around for tips; which kept Andre fed with fish. "We didn’t charge for the show, never," Goodridge said. "We passed the hat, but I could never charge for the show." By 1985, Goodridge no longer received any royalties from the hardcover or paperback issues of his book ‘’A Seal Called Andre’’, even though both had sold over 100,000 copies by that time. A later children's version rendered Goodridge a meager $1,400 in sales. "It’s nothing I could retire on, but it helps with expenses," he said. Andre's popularity produced T-shirts, tote bags, postcards along with other merchandise in local gift shops; yet Goodridge saw none of the profits.

In later life, Andre suffered from cataracts. Veterinarian Victor J. Steinglass stated he believed Andre made his annual swim up the New England coast from Cape Cod in his final year in almost complete darkness. "He obviously made it almost blind this year," he said. After 25 summers spent in Rockport with Goodridge, Andre died in July 1986 due to an apparent fight with another male seal. He was discovered eight miles from the harbor in Leland's Cove, Rockland. Goodridge was called to identify the body. According to a newspaper article, "Goodridge said he and Steinglass confirmed it was Andre by the seal’s size and its scars." Andre was buried behind the Goodridge home in Rockport, Maine. In 1976, a statue of Andre was sculpted by artist Jane Wasey and dedicated in Rockport harbor. In a 1986 interview Goodridge said Andre's pen was still in the Rockport harbor water. "I guess people are still going down, thinking Andre is still there, or at least they go down to look," Goodridge said. "I keep right away from it. I don’t want to get into any conversations."

Many seals may live longer but few live as full a life as Andre.

— Harry Goodridge

Goodridge died on April 6, 1990. He was cremated and his ashes were scattered at sea in Rockport Harbor.

== Legacy ==
In 2014, the documentary The Seal Who Came Home aired on PBS. It was narrated by Allan Corduner and showed archival footage of Harry Goodridge and Andre.

The film Andre was released in 1994. It was directed by George T. Miller and stars Tina Majorino and Keith Carradine.

Two children's books have been published about Goodridge and Andre: Andre the Famous Harbor Seal by Fran Hodgkins (2003) and The Adventures of Andre the Seal by Beth Herman (2016).

== Published works ==
- Goodridge, Harry (1975). A Seal Called Andre: The Two Worlds of a Maine Harbor Seal. ISBN 978-0-275-22000-6.

=== External links ===
- The Seal Who Came Home at IMDb
- Real People: Andre the Seal & Harry Goodridge / George Schlatter
- News Articles
