= Pioneer Valley Christian Academy =

- Springfield, Massachusetts; United States

Information
- Type: Private Christian School
- Religious affiliation: Non-denominational
- Opened: September 1972
- Faculty: 30
- Grades: K–12
- Enrollment: 300
- Campus size: 25 acres (10 ha)
- Campus type: Day school
- Colors: Blue and white
- Team name: Eagles
- Website: pvcama.org

Pioneer Valley Christian Academy is a private, non-denominational Christian school in Springfield, Massachusetts, United States. Founded in 1972, the school is accredited by the Association of Christian Schools International (ACSI) and the New England Association of Christian Schools (NEACS). The school has over 350 students in pre-K through Grade 12.

On August 19, 2014, Pioneer Valley Christian School (PVCS) unveiled a new sign and logo. The new sign and logo highlight the name change to Pioneer Valley Christian Academy (PVCA), which school officials believe reflects its academic offerings better.

== History ==
East Longmeadow Christian Day School opened in September 1972 in the facilities of the First Baptist Church of East Longmeadow, MA. Enrollment that year consisted of eighteen students in grades 1–4, a headmaster, and one teacher. As the school grew, additional grades were added, and in 1975 a high school for grades 9–12 was established. In 1977, Harold Duff, the former president of Christian Schools, Inc. in Maine, joined the school as Headmaster. Duff was also the founder of Christian Schools, Inc., which included Glen Cove Christian Academy, Glen Cove Bible College, and Canaan Christian Elementary School In 1980 Timothy Duff was hired as headmaster.

In 1985 the school moved to its present campus when it purchased the former Ursuline Academy campus. In 2002 six classrooms were added to the elementary wing. In 2009 a 17,000-square-foot (1,600 m^{2}) addition was opened, including a science lab and lecture hall, art room, technology room, music rooms for choral and instrumental instruction, a multi-purpose room, and additional classrooms. In 2016 a 39,000-square-foot (3,600 m^{2}) addition was completed, adding a new gymnasium, training rooms, locker rooms, library, and additional classrooms.

In 2023 Headmaster Timothy Duff retired after 43 years. Since 2023, Dr. Josh Keegan has served as Head of School.

== Campus ==
Pioneer Valley Christian Academy is located on a 25-acre (10 ha) campus in Western Massachusetts.
