= Glencove, Washington =

Unincorporated community in Washington, US

Glencove
- Unincorporated community
- Location within the state of Washington
- Coordinates: 47°20′45″N 122°44′13″W
- Country: United States
- State: Washington
- County: Pierce
- Elevation: 23 ft (7.0 m)
- Time zone: UTC-8 (Pacific (PST))
  - Summer (DST): UTC-7 (PDT)
- GNIS feature ID: 1510992

Glencove is an unincorporated community in Pierce County, in the U.S. state of Washington.

== History ==
A post office called Glencove was established in 1896, and remained in operation until 1924. The origin of the name Glencove is obscure.

The Glencove Hotel is listed on the National Register of Historic Places.
