= T. Allen Lawson =

American artist

- Born: August 3, 1963 (age 63); Sheridan, Wyoming, U.S.
- Education: College of Santa Fe (now Santa Fe University of Art and Design); American Academy of Art; Lyme Academy College of Fine Arts
- Occupation: Painter
- Spouse: Dorie McCullough
- Relatives: David McCullough (father-in-law)

T. Allen Lawson (born August 3, 1963) is an American artist recognized for his landscape paintings of Wyoming and Maine subjects, and is perhaps best known for having painted the White House Christmas card in 2008. His work is characterized by patient observation of nature and an interest in abstract design. He is a resident of Rockport, Maine.

== Early life ==
Lawson was born and grew up in Sheridan, Wyoming, and attended the College of Santa Fe (now Santa Fe University of Art and Design), the American Academy of Art in Chicago, and the Lyme Academy College of Fine Arts, where he studied with Deane G. Keller and Aaron Shikler; he also was mentored by artist Ned Jacob.

== Career ==
After his studies he returned to the west to paint the landscape around Jackson, Wyoming, participating in pack trips with fellow plein air painters. Initially a pure landscape painter, Lawson has more recently introduced historical references into his work; he joined a colleague in following the entire route taken by the Lewis and Clark Expedition, which served as the theme for a series of paintings depicting sites along the trail as they appear today.

He has exhibited in numerous galleries and museums, including The Haggin Museum, the University of Wyoming Art Museum, the Museum of the Rockies, the Capitol Hill Club and the Caucus Room of the Russell Senate Building in Washington, D.C. His work has been featured in publications including Western Art & Architecture, American Art Collector, PleinAir Magazine, Southwest Art, and American Artist. Among the public collections holding work by Lawson are the Portland Art Museum, Denver Art Museum, Yale University Art Museum Farnsworth Art Museum, Buffalo Bill Historical Center, and Forbes Magazine Collection.

The painting used for the White House Christmas card depicts the view from the Truman Balcony, and shows the Washington Monument and Jefferson Memorial in the distance. It is now part of the permanent collection of the White House.

In 41: A Portrait of My Father, President George W. Bush admits he hired Lawson to paint landscapes of their Prairie Chapel Ranch near Crawford, Texas.

== Personal life ==
Lawson is married to writer Dorie McCullough, daughter of author and historian David McCullough, whose influence the artist acknowledges. "What I’ve learned to appreciate from my father-in-law is that history isn’t behind us. Those who made it may have come before us. They are leading the way and we are following in their footsteps."
