= Glencove Hotel =

- U.S. National Register of Historic Places
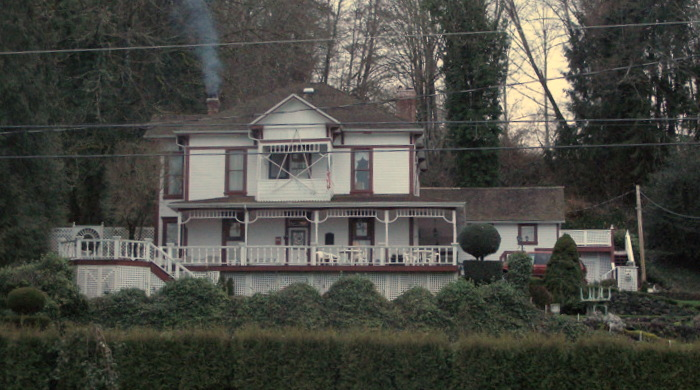

- Location within Washington (state)
- Nearest city: Gig Harbor, Washington
- Coordinates: 47°20′49″N 122°43′49″W
- Built: 1896
- NRHP reference No.: 78002767
- Added to NRHP: May 22, 1978

The Glencove Hotel is a former hotel in Glencove, Washington. It was built in 1897 by Hans Nicholas and Agnes Petersen. The hotel contained six guest rooms and three floors, but was converted to a private residence in 1930. It is currently run as a bed and breakfast.

The building was added to the National Register of Historic Places in 1978.

== Sources ==
- Findlay, Jean Cammon; Paterson, Robin (2008). Mosquito Fleet of South Puget Sound, Arcadia Publishing.
- Slater, Colleen A. (2007). The Key Peninsula, Arcadia Publishing.
