= Andre the Seal =

Harbor seal pup loved and cherished by locals

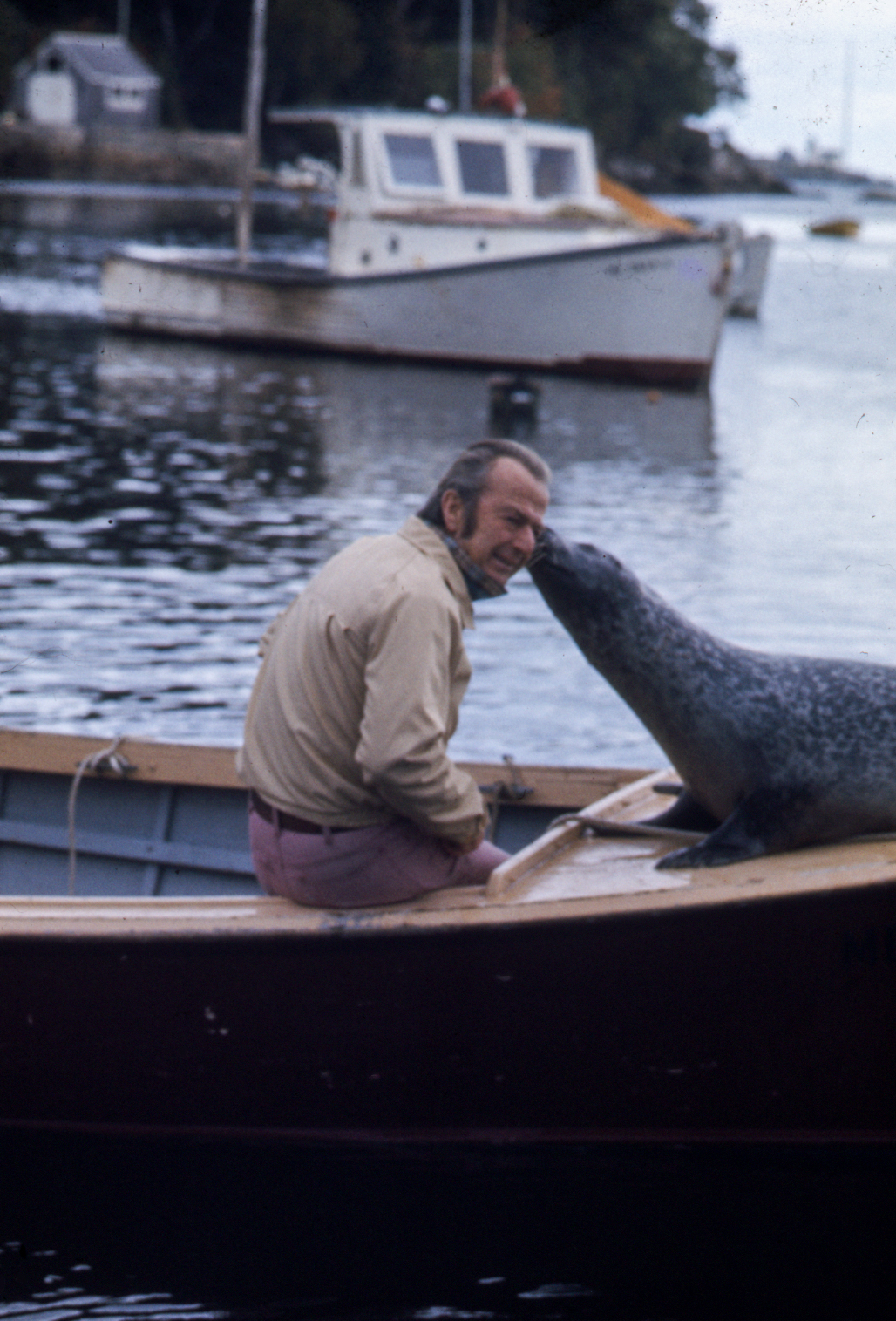
André the Seal with Harry Goodridge in 1974

André the Seal (May 16, 1961 – July 19, 1986) was a male harbor seal pup found off the island of Robinson's Rock in Penobscot Bay, Maine, United States.

== Life ==
The seal was found near Robinson’s Rock in Penobscot Bay in May 1961 by Harry Goodridge, who was then a tree surgeon and the Harbormaster of Rockport, Maine. Andre reportedly weighed approximately 19 pounds when Goodridge brought him home, where he was originally kept in a bathtub. Harry raised the pup, training him to perform more than 50 tricks, though expecting that the seal would eventually return to the wild when given the opportunity. During the later years of his life, he was transported south in the fall because Rockport Harbor freezes in the winter, and released into the ocean in the spring, after which André swam back to Rockport. André chose to stay with Harry in Rockport until his death in 1986.

== Depictions in media and art ==
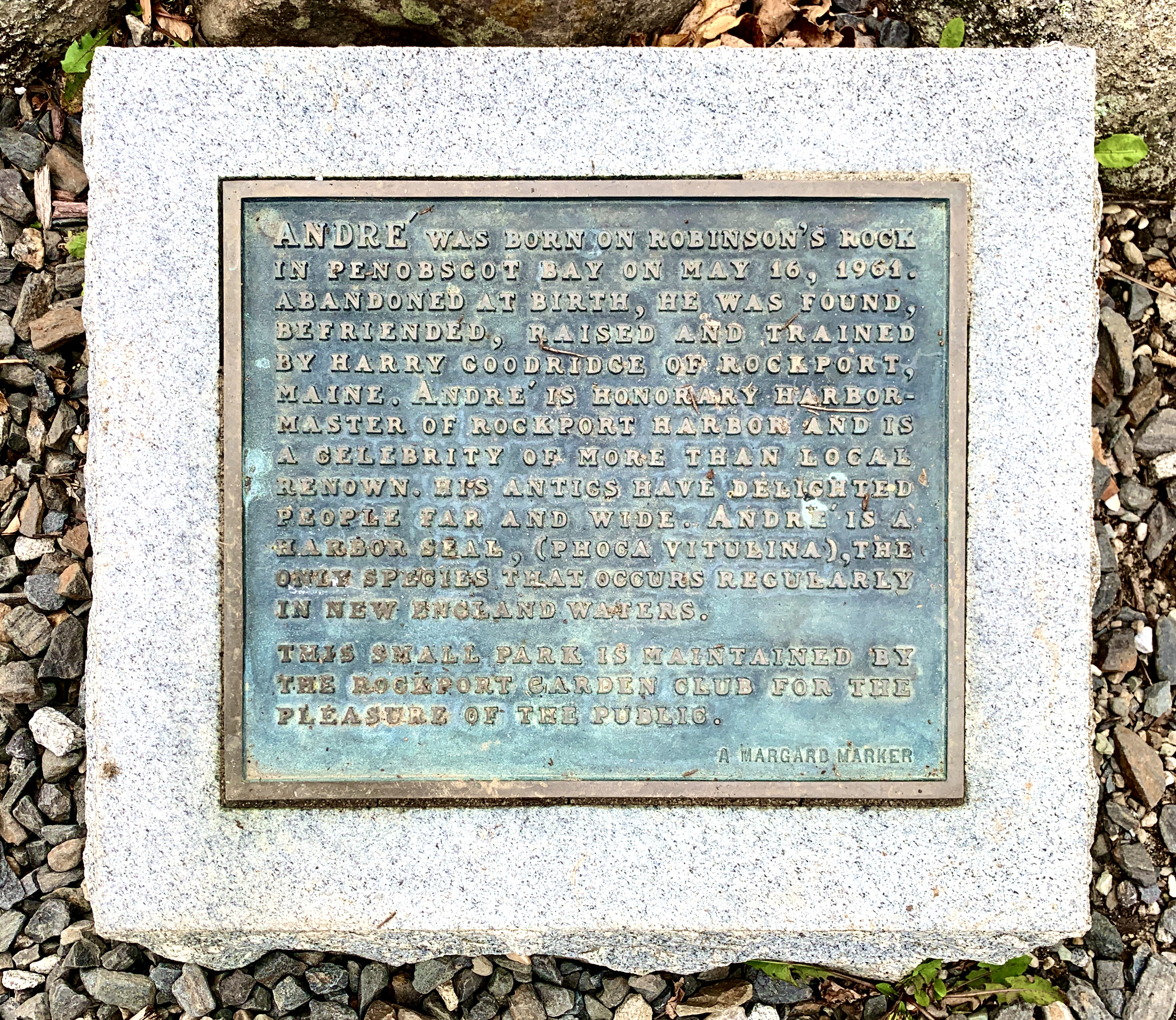
André the Seal marker in Rockport, Maine near the statue

The multi-faceted story that developed over the course of their 25-year bond has been well-documented in hundreds of news articles, several books, a 1994 feature film released by Paramount Pictures, and a PBS documentary.

André's fame and popularity even resulted in a memorial statue by Jane Wasey being built in his honour in Rockport, Maine harbour in 1978. In 2018, the limestone statue underwent a $14,000 restoration of the face, which had sustained numerous cracks. Legacy Rockport, a nonprofit, allocated $6,000 for the cause. The remaining funds came from private donors, including $2,500 from a local garden club.

== See also ==
- Hoover (seal)
