= Jane Wasey =

American sculptor

Jane Wasey (1912 Chicago, IL - 1992 Glen Cove, ME) was an American artist known for her sculptures of human and animal figures, executed in both realistic and abstract modes. She began her education at age 17 at the Academy Julian in Paris studying with Paul Landowski. She further studied with J. Bertrand in Paris and with Simon Moselsio, John Flanagan, and Heinz Warneke in New York City.

Wasey's work can be found in permanent museum collections including the Whitney Museum of American Art the Hood Museum of Art, and the Farnsworth Art Museum. She was a founding member of the Sculptors Guild in 1937. Wasey sculpted the granite memorial to Andre the Seal in Rockport, ME harbor.

Wasey is included in the North American Women Artists of the Twentieth Century: A Biographical Dictionary.
