= Glen Cove, Maine =

- Village
- Location within Maine Location within the United States
- Coordinates: 44°08′01″N 69°05′39″W
- Country: United States
- State: Maine
- County: Knox
- Town: Rockport
- Elevation: 52 ft (16 m)
- Time zone: UTC-5 (Eastern (EST))
  - Summer (DST): UTC-4 (EDT)
- Area code: 207
- GNIS feature ID: 566838

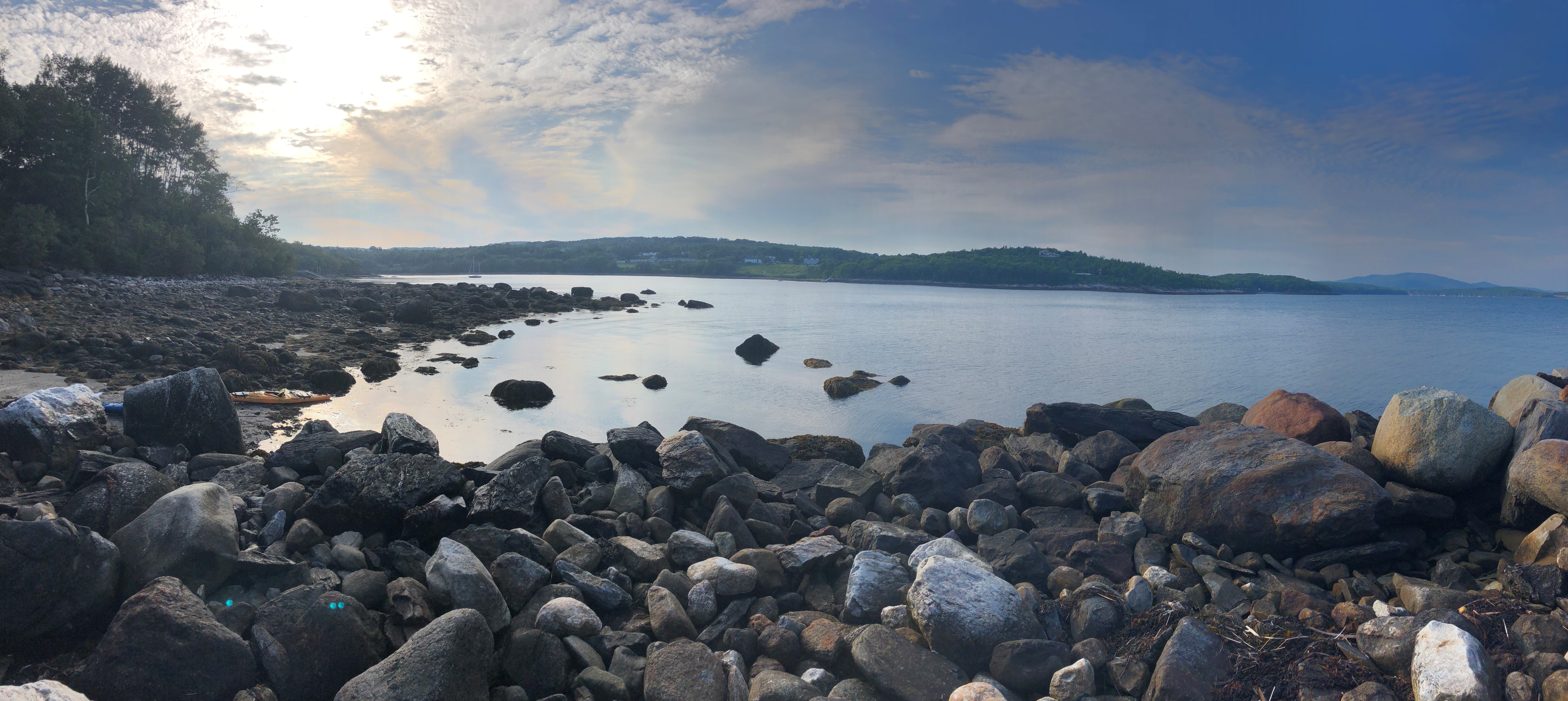
Looking into Glen Cove from the shore

Glen Cove is an unincorporated village within the town of Rockport in Knox County, Maine, United States. The community is located on U.S. Route 1 and Clam Cove, an arm of the Penobscot Bay, 2.2 miles (3.5 km) north of Rockland. Glen Cove had a post office until it closed on December 20, 2003.
