= Rockport, Maine =

- Town
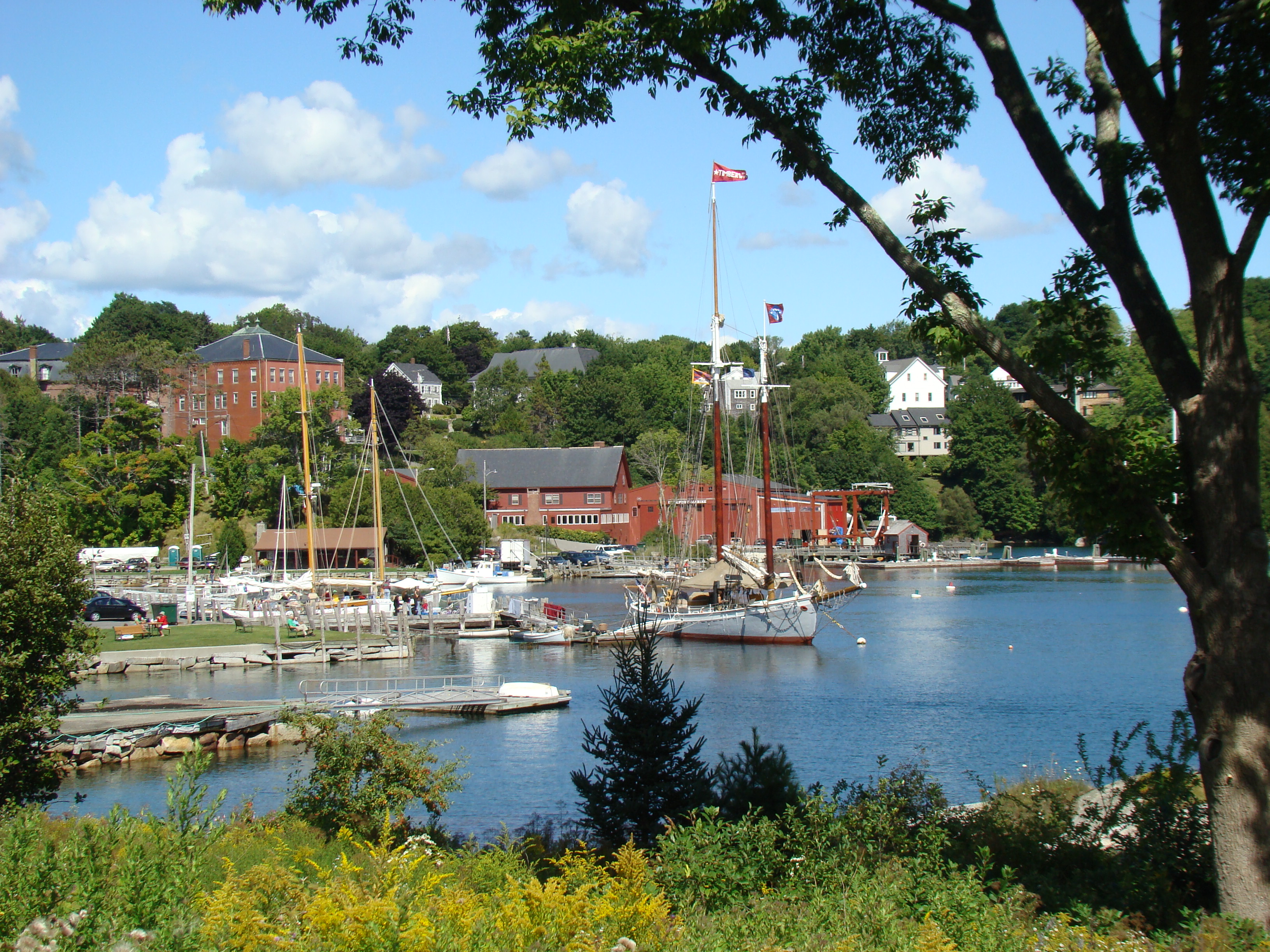
- View of Rockport Harbor

- Seal

- Location in Knox County and the state of Maine
- Coordinates: 44°09′04″N 69°06′34″W
- Country: United States
- State: Maine
- County: Knox
- Incorporated: 1891
- Villages: Rockport; Glen Cove; Oakland Park; Rockville; West Rockport

Area
  - Total: 33.34 sq mi (86.35 km^{2})
  - Land: 21.64 sq mi (56.05 km^{2})
  - Water: 11.70 sq mi (30.30 km^{2})
- Elevation: 443 ft (135 m)

Population (2020)
  - Total: 3,644
  - Density: 170/sq mi (65/km^{2})
- Time zone: UTC−5 (Eastern (EST))
  - Summer (DST): UTC−4 (EDT)
- ZIP Code: 04856
- Area code: 207
- FIPS code: 23-63660
- GNIS feature ID: 582699
- Website: rockportmaine.gov

Rockport is a town in Knox County, Maine, United States. It is 35 miles (56.3 km) southeast of Augusta. The population was 3,644 at the 2020 census. Rockport is a popular tourist destination and art colony.

== History ==
=== Pre-Settlement ===
The coastal land that would eventually be incorporated as Rockport was a vast, resource-rich territory. Prior to permanent European settlement, the region was sparsely populated by various nomadic Native American groups, chiefly known as the Wabanaki, who utilized the natural resources of the coast and forest through a traditional hunting and gathering existence. This favorable environment was soon recognized by European pioneers as an ideal location for a successful settlement.

=== Early settlement ===
The documented history of the town officially began in 1769 with the arrival of the first European pioneer, Robert Thorndike, initiating an era of organized community development and industry in the region. Rockport was originally known as "the River" and later as Goose River Village. The area was initially part of the Megunticook Plantation, which was incorporated as Camden in 1791.

=== Industrial development ===
==== Lime industry dominance ====
Rockport became a major center for lime production during the 19th century, capitalizing on extensive local limestone deposits. Shipbuilding, ice harvesting, and the manufacture of lime were the town's primary early industries. The limestone deposits in the Thomaston-Rockland-Rockport area were both high-quality and conveniently located near the coast, making them easily transportable by ship.

At the height of the industry, Rockport's lime kilns operated around the clock, 365 days a year, converting limestone from fifteen local quarries into lime for mortar and plaster. In 1817, three hundred casks of lime from Rockport were shipped to Washington, D.C. for use in rebuilding the United States Capitol, which had been damaged by the British during the War of 1812.

==== Ice industry ====
Rockport also became renowned for its ice harvesting operations. The annual harvest of Lily Pond produced 50,000 tons of clear ice that was shipped worldwide. Rockport Ice Company became known for its "Lily Pond Ice," which was so clear that one could read a newspaper through a thick slab of it.

=== Municipal development ===
In 1852, the citizens of Goose River Village voted to change their community's name to Rockport, reflecting the area's rocky coastal terrain.

==== Separation from Camden ====
On February 25, 1891, Rockport officially separated from Camden following a dispute known as "The Bridge Question" over the cost of constructing a bridge. The newly independent town of Rockport gained half of Camden's population, three-quarters of its land area, and control of the profitable lime and ice industries.

=== Industrial decline ===
The lime industry's dominance began to wane in the early 20th century. A devastating fire in 1907 destroyed many of the waterfront lime kilns, occurring at a time when cement was beginning to replace lime in building construction. Another significant fire starting in the lime sheds spread across the harbor to the ice houses, effectively ending both industries. Neither was ever rebuilt, marking the beginning of Rockport's economic transition.

=== Cultural and artistic development ===
==== Arts community establishment ====
Rockport developed a significant reputation as an artists' community during the 20th century. Mary Louise Curtis Bok, who was instrumental in founding both Bay Chamber Concerts and the Curtis Institute of Music, became one of Rockport's largest landowners and played a role in developing the landscaping around the village's inner harbor, at one time owning most of the eastern shore.

Bay Chamber Concerts was established in 1961 as a continuation of the summer music instruction program of the Curtis Institute. Mary Lea Park, adjacent to the Rockport Opera House, honors both Curtis Bok and Rockport resident violinist Lea Luboshutz.

=== Modern era ===
==== Historic preservation ====
The lime kilns at Rockport Marine Park represent the last remaining multiple-kiln collection on the Maine coast. These kilns were listed on the National Register of Historic Places in 1970, and restoration efforts have continued to preserve this industrial heritage. The kilns are now part of Rockport Marine Park, which also includes a preserved Vulcan locomotive that transported limestone from local quarries to the harbor for processing.

==== Contemporary recognition and tourism ====
From 1961 to 1986, Rockport gained national attention through Andre the Seal, a harbor seal adopted as a pup by local harbormaster Harry Goodridge. Andre developed a unique migration pattern, spending winters at aquariums in Boston and Connecticut before returning each spring to Rockport Harbor. The seal attracted visitors and media coverage, becoming the subject of books, a 1994 feature film, and PBS documentaries. A statue of Andre was dedicated in Rockport Marine Park in 1978, with the seal himself present at the unveiling. In 2018, the community raised funds for a $14,000 restoration of the limestone statue.

In 2008, Forbes magazine ranked Rockport first on its list of America's prettiest towns.

==== Current status ====
Today, Rockport continues to operate as an arts community and tourist destination, with institutions such as the Maine Media Workshops, the Rockport Opera House, and various art galleries. The town maintains a balance between preservation of its industrial heritage and contemporary development.

== Geography ==
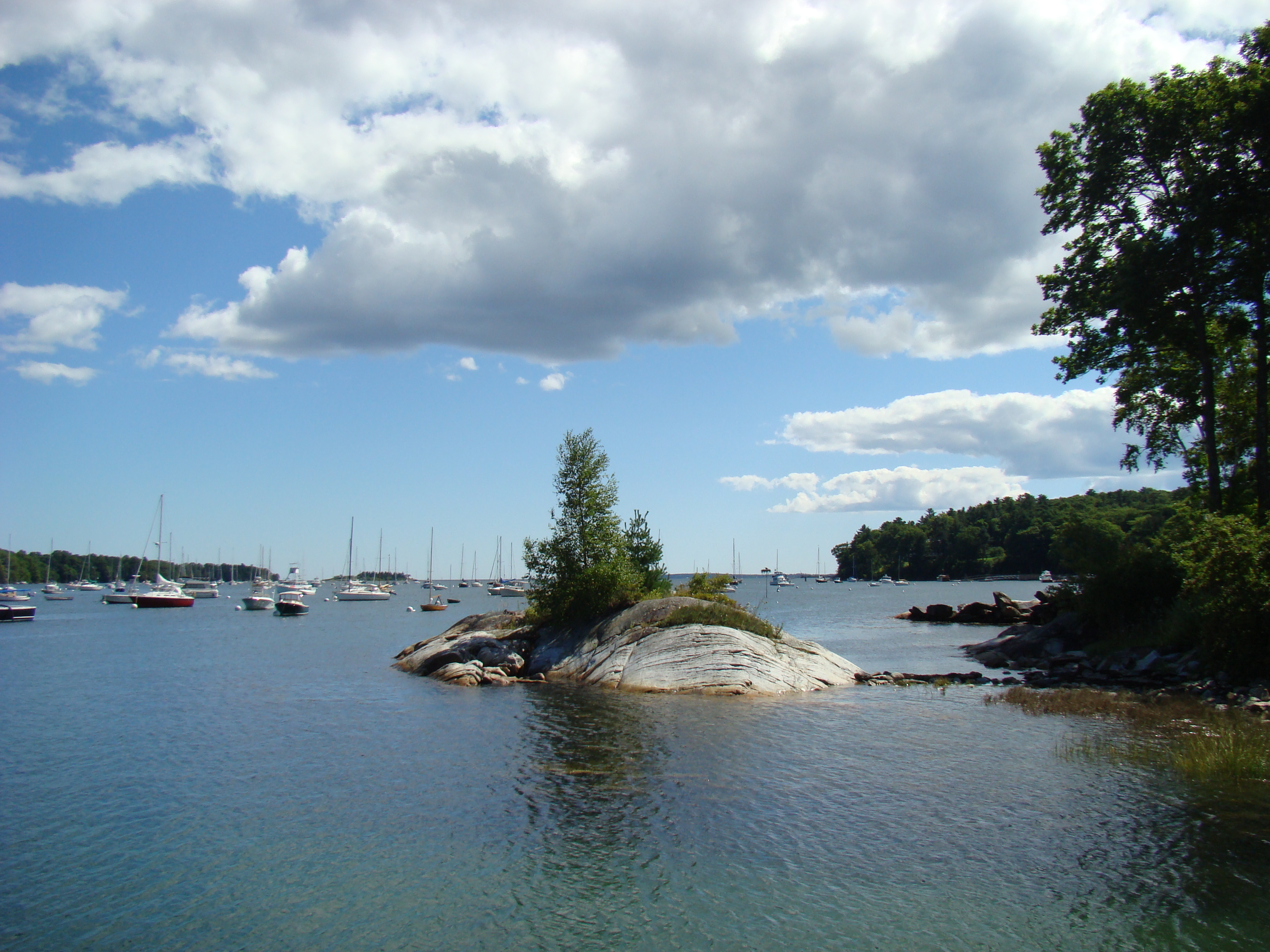
Tidal Island

According to the United States Census Bureau, the town has a total area of 33.34 square miles (86.35 km^{2}), of which 21.64 square miles (56.05 km^{2}) is land and 11.70 square miles (30.30 km^{2}) is water. Drained by Varnah Brook and Goose River, Rockport is located beside Penobscot Bay and the Gulf of Maine, part of the Atlantic Ocean.

The town is crossed by U. S. Route 1 and state routes 17 and 90. It borders the towns of Rockland to the south, Warren to the southwest, Union to the west, Hope to the northwest, and Camden to the north.

=== Climate ===
This climatic region is typified by large seasonal temperature differences, with warm to hot (and often humid) summers and cold (sometimes severely cold) winters. According to the Köppen Climate Classification system, Rockport has a humid continental climate, abbreviated "Dfb" on climate maps.

Climate data for West Rockport, Maine, 1991–2020 normals, extremes 1937–present
Month	Jan	Feb	Mar	Apr	May	Jun	Jul	Aug	Sep	Oct	Nov	Dec	Year
Record high °F (°C)	59 (15)	65 (18)	84 (29)	85 (29)	95 (35)	98 (37)	96 (36)	99 (37)	95 (35)	88 (31)	75 (24)	63 (17)	99 (37)
Mean maximum °F (°C)	49.5 (9.7)	49.1 (9.5)	57.2 (14.0)	70.4 (21.3)	81.7 (27.6)	86.3 (30.2)	87.9 (31.1)	87.2 (30.7)	83.7 (28.7)	72.4 (22.4)	63.2 (17.3)	54.5 (12.5)	90.4 (32.4)
Mean daily maximum °F (°C)	30.3 (−0.9)	32.5 (0.3)	39.6 (4.2)	51.4 (10.8)	62.4 (16.9)	70.8 (21.6)	76.7 (24.8)	76.3 (24.6)	69.0 (20.6)	57.2 (14.0)	46.7 (8.2)	36.4 (2.4)	54.1 (12.3)
Daily mean °F (°C)	21.2 (−6.0)	23.1 (−4.9)	30.9 (−0.6)	42.5 (5.8)	53.3 (11.8)	62.1 (16.7)	68.2 (20.1)	67.7 (19.8)	60.5 (15.8)	49.0 (9.4)	38.9 (3.8)	28.3 (−2.1)	45.5 (7.5)
Mean daily minimum °F (°C)	12.0 (−11.1)	13.6 (−10.2)	22.2 (−5.4)	33.6 (0.9)	44.1 (6.7)	53.5 (11.9)	59.6 (15.3)	59.2 (15.1)	51.9 (11.1)	40.9 (4.9)	31.1 (−0.5)	20.2 (−6.6)	36.8 (2.7)
Mean minimum °F (°C)	−7.3 (−21.8)	−4.6 (−20.3)	1.8 (−16.8)	23.3 (−4.8)	33.3 (0.7)	43.3 (6.3)	51.6 (10.9)	49.6 (9.8)	40.5 (4.7)	28.0 (−2.2)	16.1 (−8.8)	1.9 (−16.7)	−10.6 (−23.7)
Record low °F (°C)	−22 (−30)	−30 (−34)	−12 (−24)	10 (−12)	21 (−6)	28 (−2)	40 (4)	37 (3)	24 (−4)	14 (−10)	2 (−17)	−25 (−32)	−30 (−34)
Average precipitation inches (mm)	4.75 (121)	4.20 (107)	5.01 (127)	5.21 (132)	4.22 (107)	4.49 (114)	3.20 (81)	3.37 (86)	4.49 (114)	6.07 (154)	5.27 (134)	5.92 (150)	56.20 (1,427)
Average snowfall inches (cm)	17.2 (44)	19.2 (49)	11.3 (29)	3.5 (8.9)	0.0 (0.0)	0.0 (0.0)	0.0 (0.0)	0.0 (0.0)	0.0 (0.0)	0.2 (0.51)	2.3 (5.8)	15.0 (38)	68.7 (175.21)
Average precipitation days (≥ 0.01 in)	9.8	8.8	9.8	10.8	11.8	11.7	10.5	9.3	8.9	11.0	9.7	11.9	124.0
Average snowy days (≥ 0.1 in)	5.5	5.7	3.5	1.1	0.0	0.0	0.0	0.0	0.0	0.1	0.7	4.2	20.8
Source 1: NOAA
Source 2: National Weather Service

== Demographics ==
Historical population
Census	Pop.	Note	%±
1900	2,314		—
1910	2,022		−12.6%
1920	1,774		−12.3%
1930	1,651		−6.9%
1940	1,526		−7.6%
1950	1,656		8.5%
1960	1,893		14.3%
1970	2,067		9.2%
1980	2,749		33.0%
1990	2,854		3.8%
2000	3,209		12.4%
2010	3,330		3.8%
2020	3,644		9.4%
U.S. Decennial Census

=== 2010 census ===
As of the census of 2010, there were 3,330 people, 1,422 households, and 967 families residing in the town. The population density was 153.9 inhabitants per square mile (59.4/km^{2}). There were 1,956 housing units at an average density of 90.4 per square mile (34.9/km^{2}). The racial makeup of the town was 97.6% White, 0.3% African American, 0.5% Native American, 0.4% Asian, and 1.2% from two or more races. Hispanic or Latino of any race were 1.1% of the population.

There were 1,422 households, of which 27.7% had children under the age of 18 living with them, 56.1% were married couples living together, 8.7% had a female householder with no husband present, 3.2% had a male householder with no wife present, and 32.0% were non-families. Of all households, 25.6% were made up of individuals, and 10.5% had someone living alone who was 65 years of age or older. The average household size was 2.34 and the average family size was 2.80.

The median age in the town was 48.8 years. 22% of residents were under the age of 18; 4.5% were between the ages of 18 and 24; 17.8% were from 25 to 44; 35.8% were from 45 to 64; and 19.9% were 65 years of age or older. The gender makeup of the town was 48.2% male and 51.8% female.

=== 2000 census ===
In the 2000 census, there were 3,209 people, 1,373 households and 918 families in the town. The population density was 147.8 inhabitants per square mile (57.1/km^{2}). There were 1,677 housing units at an average density of 77.2 per square mile (29.8/km^{2}). The racial makeup was 98.69% White, 0.16% African American, 0.06% Native American, 0.44% Asian, 0.19% from other races, and 0.47% from two or more races. Hispanic or Latino of any race were 0.75% of the population.

There were 1,373 households, of which 29.6% had children under 18 living with them, 56.2% were married couples living together, 8.2% had a female householder with no husband present, and 33.1% were non-families. Of all households, 27.7% were made up of individuals, and 11.5% had someone living alone who was 65 years of age or older. The average household size was 2.33 and the average family size was 2.83.

In the town, the population was spread out, with 23.5% under 18, 5.0% from 18 to 24, 25.3% from 25 to 44, 28.9% from 45 to 64, and 17.3% who were 65 or older. The median age was 43. For every 100 females, there were 91.7 males. For every 100 females 18 and over, there were 89.0 males.

The median income for a household in the town was $47,155, and the median for a family $56,068. Males had a median of $35,865 versus $25,542 for females. The per capita income for the town was $25,498. About 5.4% of families and 7.1% of the population were below the poverty line, including 10.2% of those under 18 and 7.3% of those 65 or over.

== Sites of interest ==
- Aldermere Farm—Maine Coast Heritage Trust
- Bay Chamber Concerts
- Camden Area History Center
- Camden-Rockport Historical Society
- Center for Maine Contemporary Art
- Indian Island Light
- Maine Media Workshops
- Rockport Opera House

== Education ==
- Maine School Administrative District 28 operates K–8 schools
- Camden Hills Regional High School
- Ashwood Waldorf School
- The Riley School

== Notable people ==
- Stephen Bowen, state legislator and Commissioner of Education under Paul LePage
- Gabriel Byrne, Irish actor, lives here
- Lew Dietz, writer
- Andre the Seal
- Harry Goodridge, author
- John Gribbel, banker and businessman
- T. Allen Lawson, artist
- Thomas Tertius Noble, English organist and composer, died here
- Bidu Sayão, Brazilian soprano singer, lived and died here
- Ada Bampton Tremaine, philanthropist
- Molly White, software engineer, Wikipedia editor, and crypto skeptic
