= Julius S. Held =

- Born: 15 April 1905; Mosbach, Germany
- Died: 22 December 2002 (aged 97); Bennington, Vermont, U.S.
- Other name: Julius S. Held

Academic background
- Education: University of Freiburg

Academic work
- Institutions: Barnard College
- Main interests: Peter Paul Rubens, Rembrandt, Anthony van Dyck

Julius Samuel Held (1905–2002) was an art historian, collector, and expert on Dutch painters Peter Paul Rubens, Anthony van Dyck, and Rembrandt. He published several monographs and was a professor of art history at Barnard College, Columbia University, from 1937 to 1970.

== Biography ==
Julius S. Held was born on April 15, 1905, to Adolf and Nannette Held, who ran a clothing store in Mosbach, Germany. He attended university in Freiburg, Heidelberg, Berlin, and Vienna, and earned his doctorate from the University of Freiburg in 1930 with a dissertation on Albrecht Dürer. After the Nazi regime came to power in 1933, Held sought a way to emigrate. He arrived in the United States in 1934. In 1936, he married Ingrid-Marta Nordin-Petterson, an art conservator. The couple had two children.

Held became professor of art history at Columbia University's Barnard College in New York City in 1937, a position he held until his retirement in 1970. Later in his life, he moved to Bennington, Vermont, where he died in 2002.

== Works ==
Held wrote several monographs on Dutch painters including Rembrandt, Anthony van Dyck, and Peter Paul Rubens. These works can be found by searching for Julius S. Held on Worldcat.

== See also ==
- Julius S. Held Collection of Rare Books
