= Julius S. Held Collection of Rare Books =

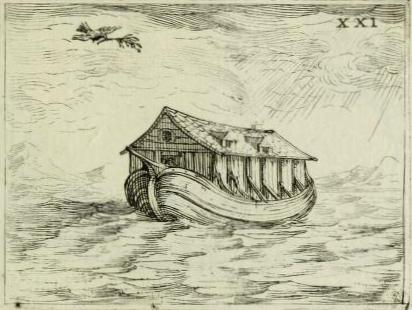
Noah's Ark with Noah's dove. From: Vita beatæ Mariæ Vir[ginis] matris Dei, emblematib[us] delineata.

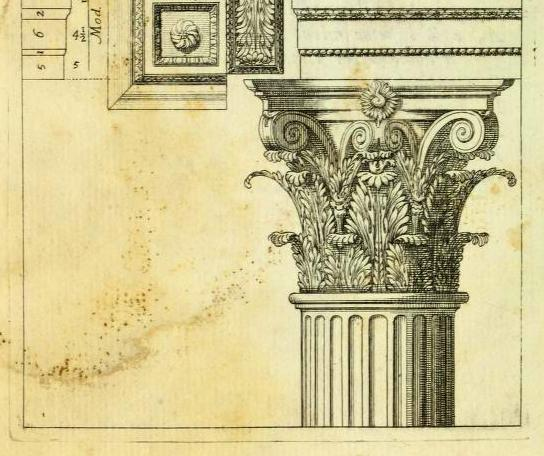
[Detail] Regola delli cinque ordini d'architettura di M. Jac. Barozzio da Vignola (1736).

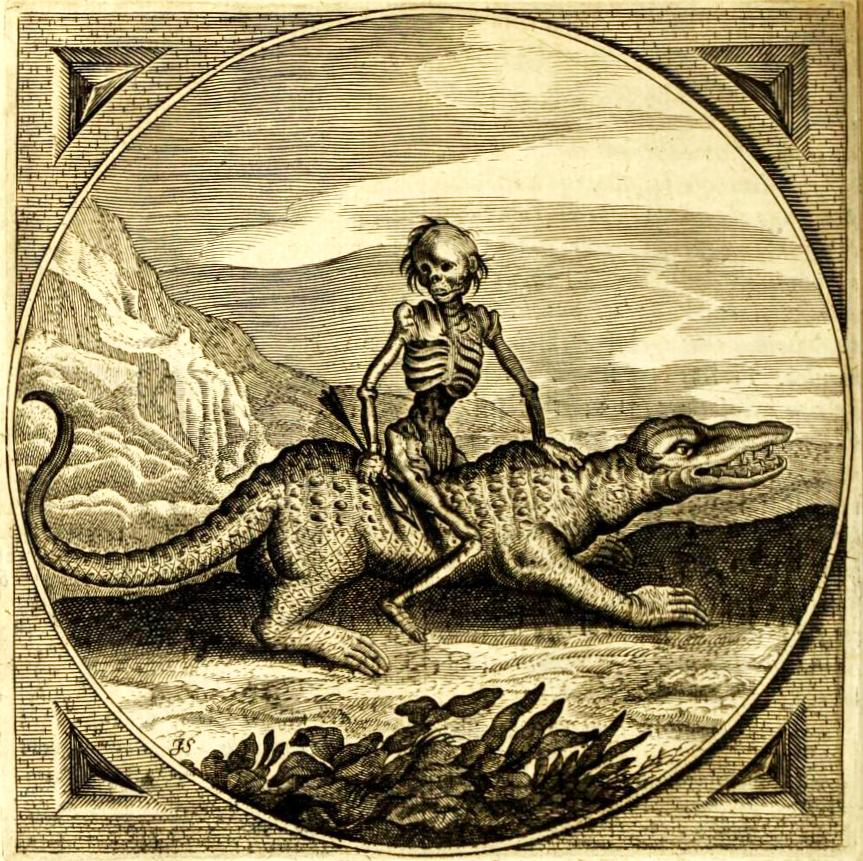
[Detail] Proteus, ofte, Minne-beelden verandert in sinne-beelden (1627).

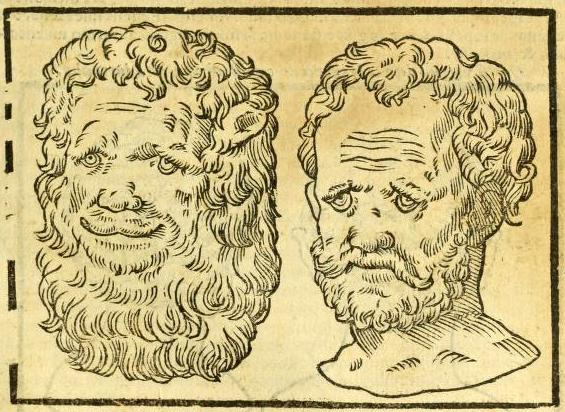
[Detail] Della fisionomia dell'huomo (1644).

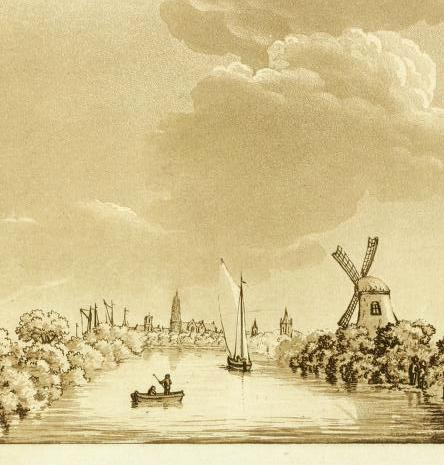
View of Delft from the direction of Rotterdam. From: A picturesque tour through Holland, Brabant, and part of France; made in the autumn of 1789 (1790).

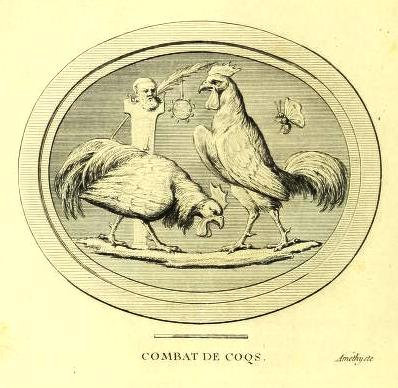
[Detail] Description des principales pierres gravées du cabinet de S. A. S. Monseigneur le duc d'Orléans, premier prince du sang (1780).

The Julius S. Held Collection of Rare Books is a research collection of 283 volumes which is held in the Library of the Clark Art Institute.

The collection was assembled over the course of his career by art historian Julius S. Held (1905–2002), a longtime professor at Barnard College, Columbia University (1937–1970), who was renowned internationally for his scholarship in sixteenth and seventeenth century Dutch and Flemish art and as a scholar of Rubens and Rembrandt. Volumes include illustrations by artists such as Peter Paul Rubens, Albrecht Dürer, and Anthony van Dyck. The books include works by Virgil and Ovid, versions of Aesop's Fables, as well as titles on astronomy, religion, natural history, and anatomy dating from the sixteenth through the nineteenth century, in a range of languages, including Greek, Latin, German, Italian, English, and French. The collection also includes important art histories and early treatises on the emblem and iconology.

Of note are the approximately 80 books that form the working core of Held's scholarly collection. These texts include his manuscript annotations and commentary concerning provenance and identification of illustrations present in the texts and appear on the inside of covers, as marginalia, and as end notes on the fly leaves. Also included are separate ephemera consisting of Held’s notes on images within the works, along with letters, invitations, annotated dealer’s catalogs and offprints.

The collection is currently being digitized; recently added volumes can be viewed in the Clark Library Digital Collections. According to the Institute of Museum and Library Services press release of Grants to Museums in 2014: "The Sterling and Francine Clark Art Institute will digitize significant volumes from the Julius S. Held Collection of Rare Books, in the Clark Library, and make these materials available through the library's digital collections interface, the Internet Archive, the Getty Research Portal, the Massachusetts Digital Commonwealth, and the Digital Public Library of America. The museum will digitize 185 of the collection's 283 volumes and enhance cataloging and metadata for the more than 107,000 images in the collection, including a significant number of rare titles and unique volumes dating from the sixteenth through the nineteenth century. The project fulfills the museum's goal of collections stewardship by allowing access to these exceedingly rare volumes, ensuring their physical preservation while facilitating access and knowledge."

== Accessibility ==
The collection is non-circulating. The digitized volumes of the Julius S. Held Collection of Rare Books are available online through the Clark Digital Collections, and at the Internet Archive. Collection titles can be viewed in the Library Catalog. To access rare volumes at the Clark Art Institute Library, it is necessary for researchers to telephone, email, or write in advance of their visit; contact information is located on the home page.

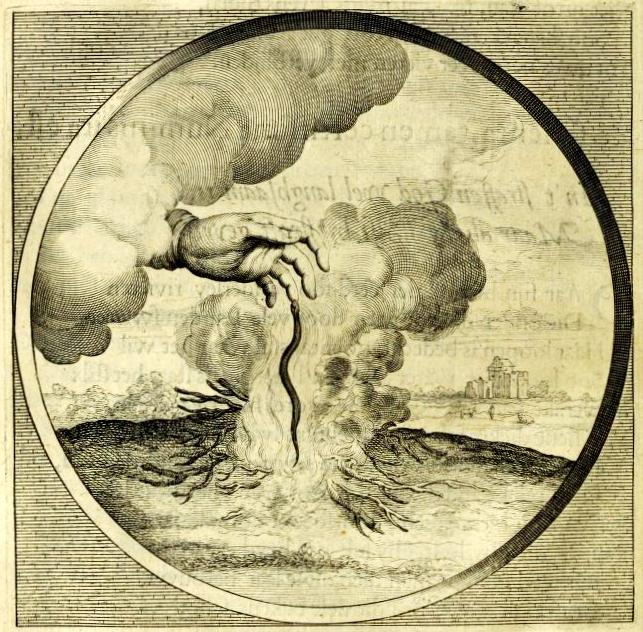
[Detail] Nederduytsche poëmata (1635). Ebook

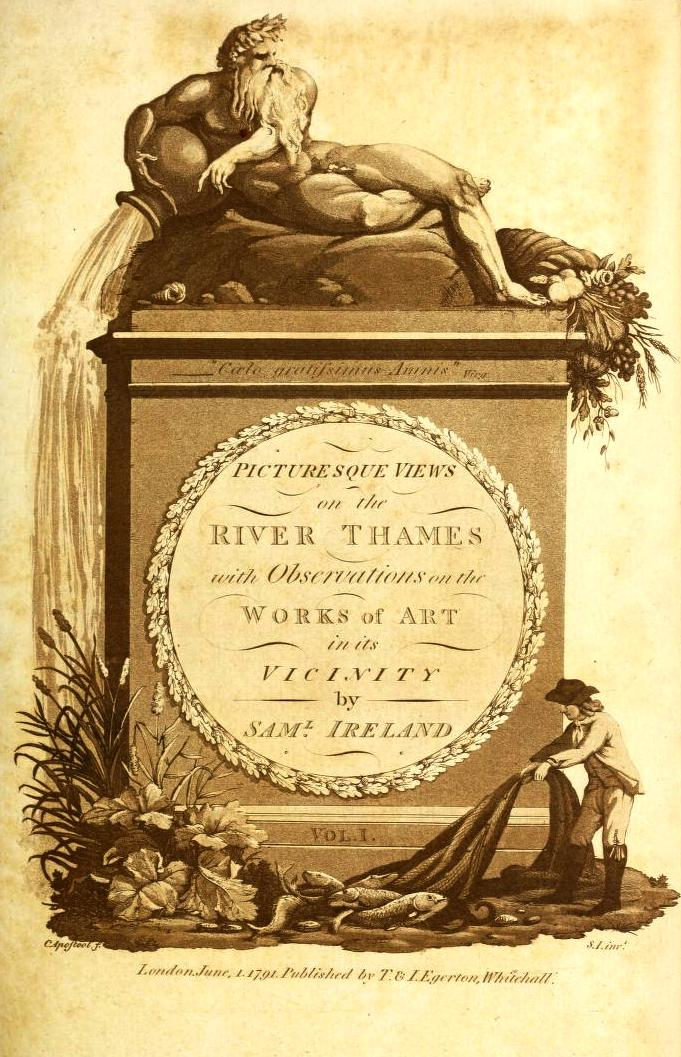
Picturesque views on the River Thames, from its source in Gloucestershire to the Nore (1792). Ebook

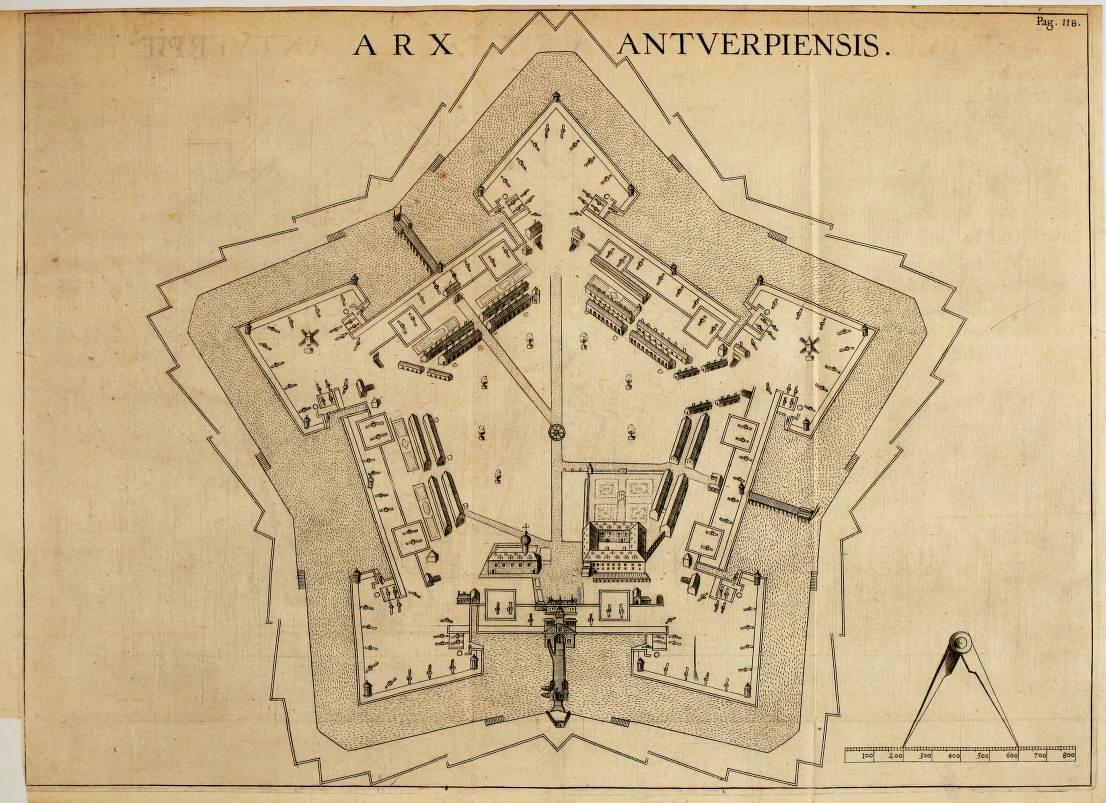
Antverpia (1610). Ebook

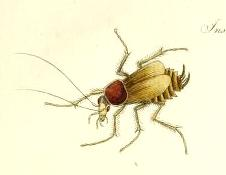
[Detail] Les genres des insectes de Linné; constatés par divers échantillons d'insectes d'Angleterre, copiés d'après nature (1781). Ebook

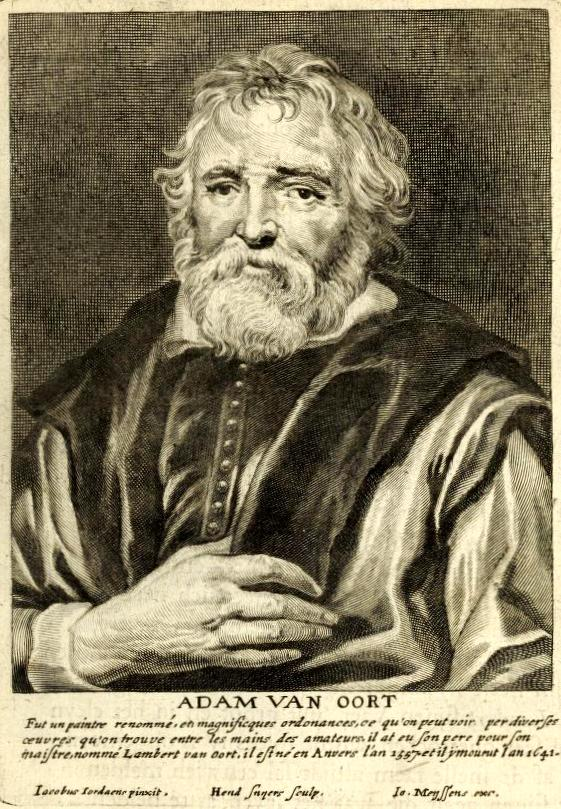
Het gulden cabinet van de edele vry schilder-const (1662). Ebook

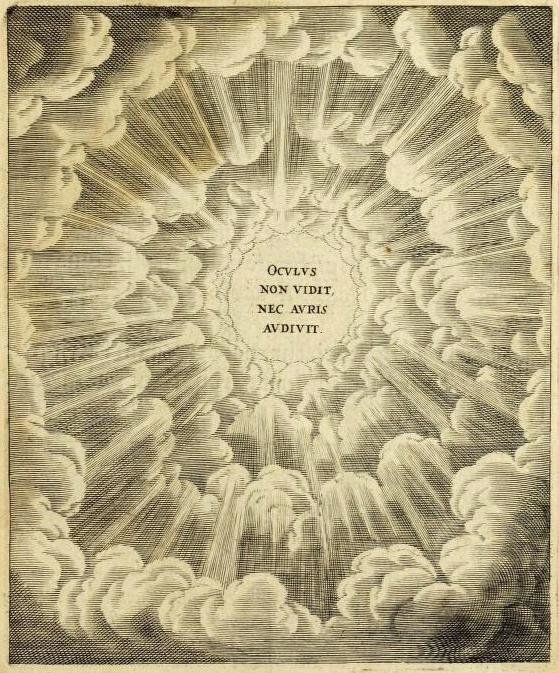
Amoris diuini emblemata (1615). Ebook

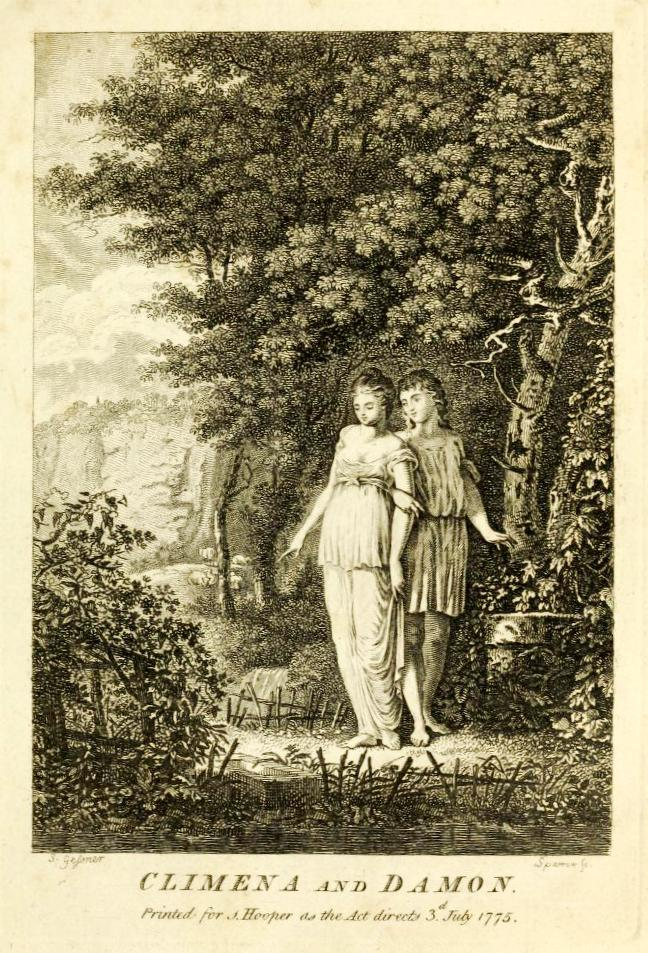
New idylles (1776). Ebook

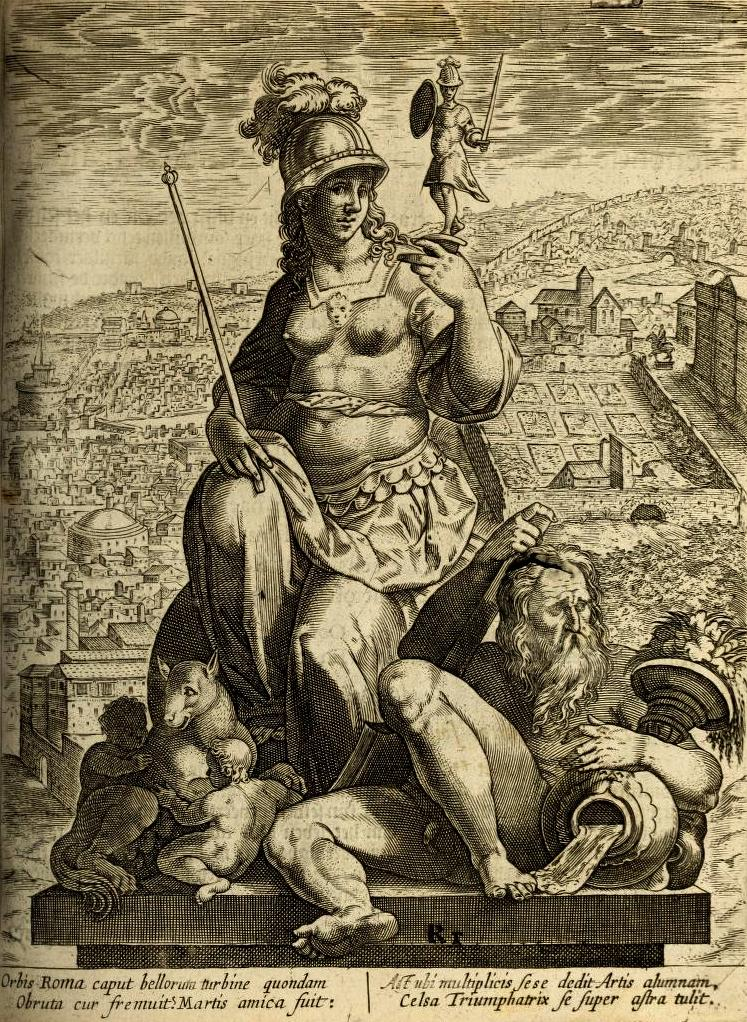
Het gulden cabinet van de edele vry schilder-const (1662). Ebook

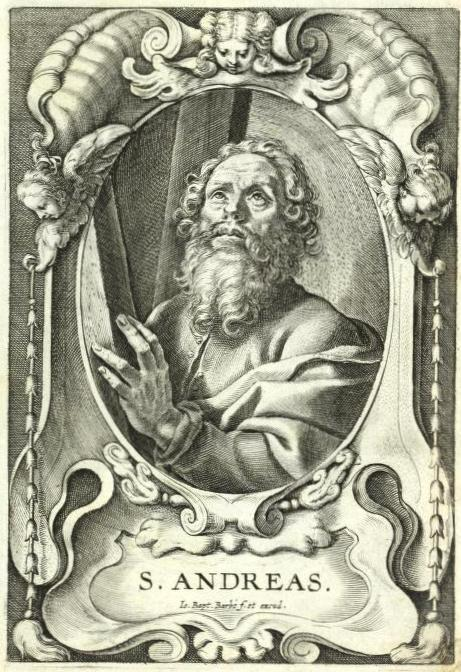
SS. apostolorum et evangelistarum icones cum suis parergis a Theodoro VanLonto, delineatae (1620). Ebook

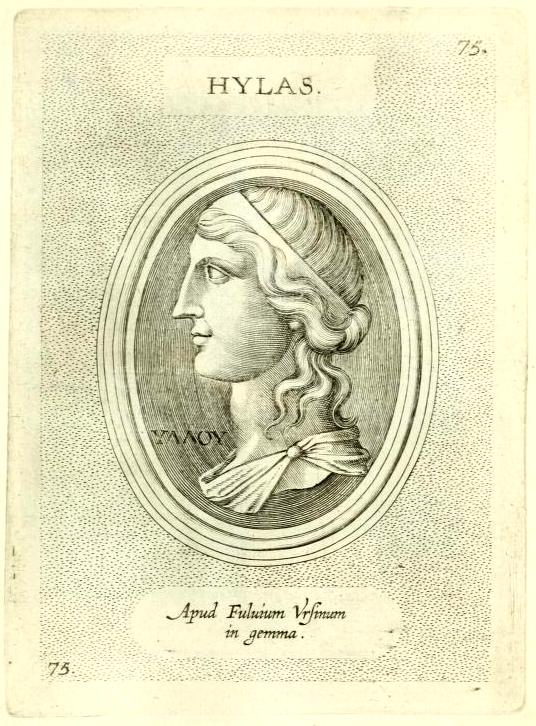
Illvstrivm imagines, ex antiquis marmoribus, nomismatibus, et gemmis expressae: quæ exstant Romæ, maior pars apud Fulvium Vrsinvm (1598). Ebook

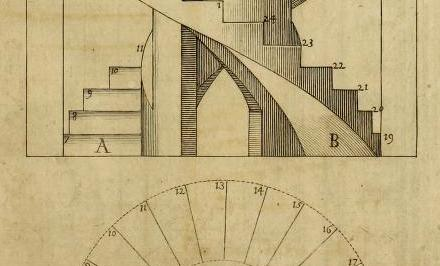
Instrvction en la science de perspective (1625). Ebook

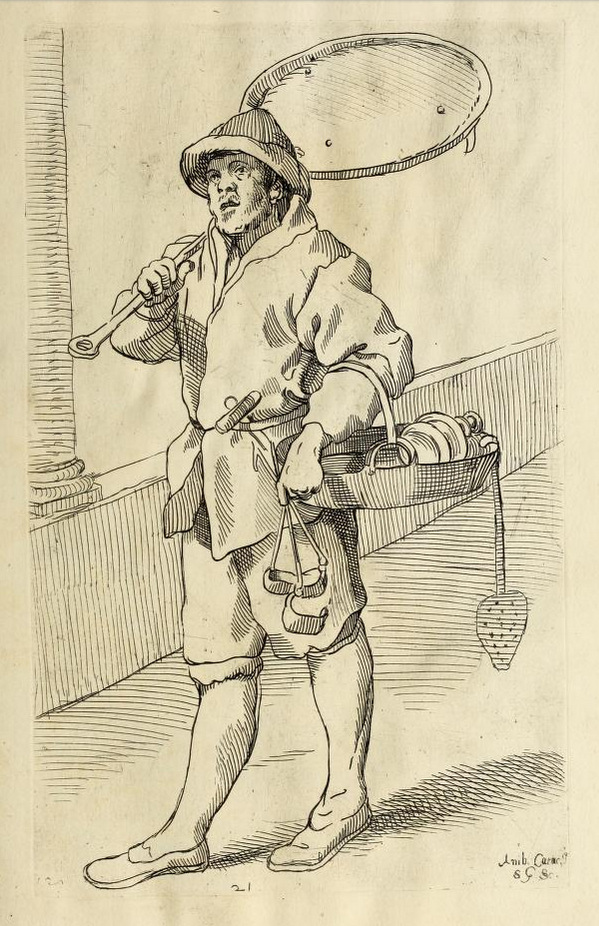
Diverse figure al nvmero di ottanta (1646). Ebook

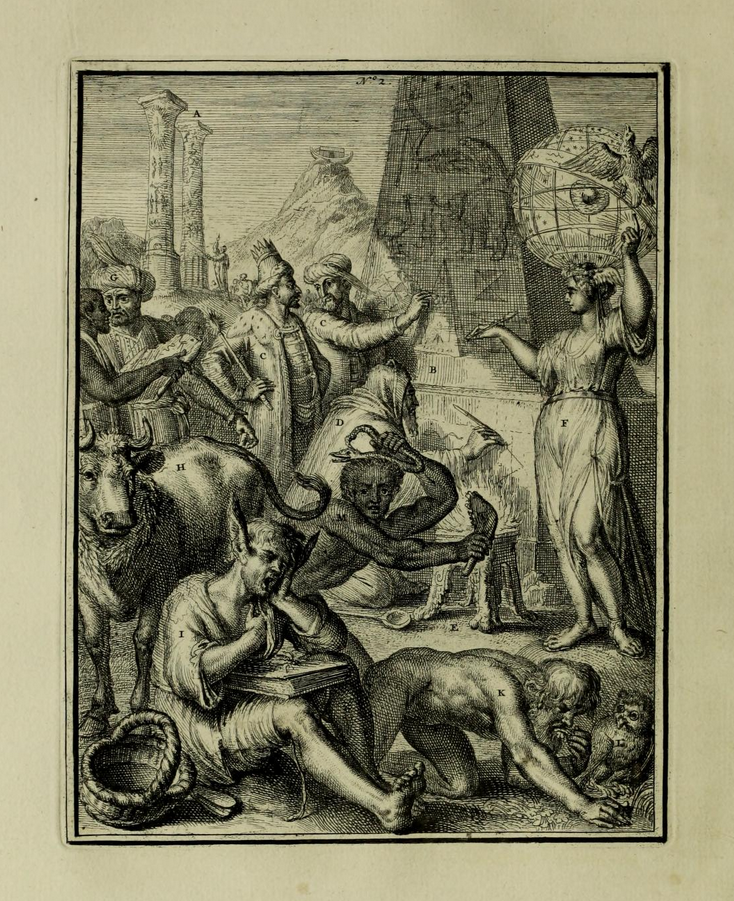
Hieroglyphica of Merkbeelden der oude volkeren (1735). Ebook

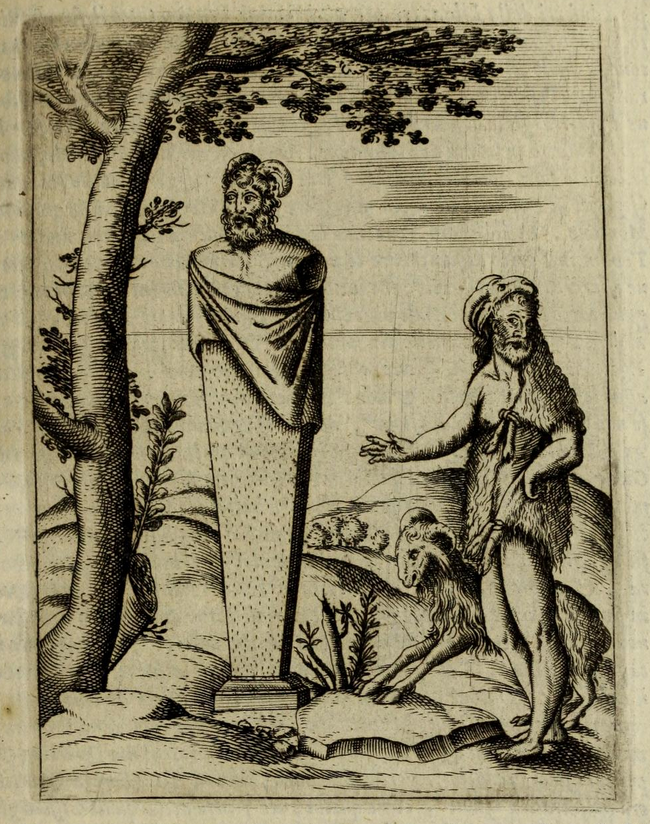
Le imagini de gli dei de gli antichi (1663). Ebook

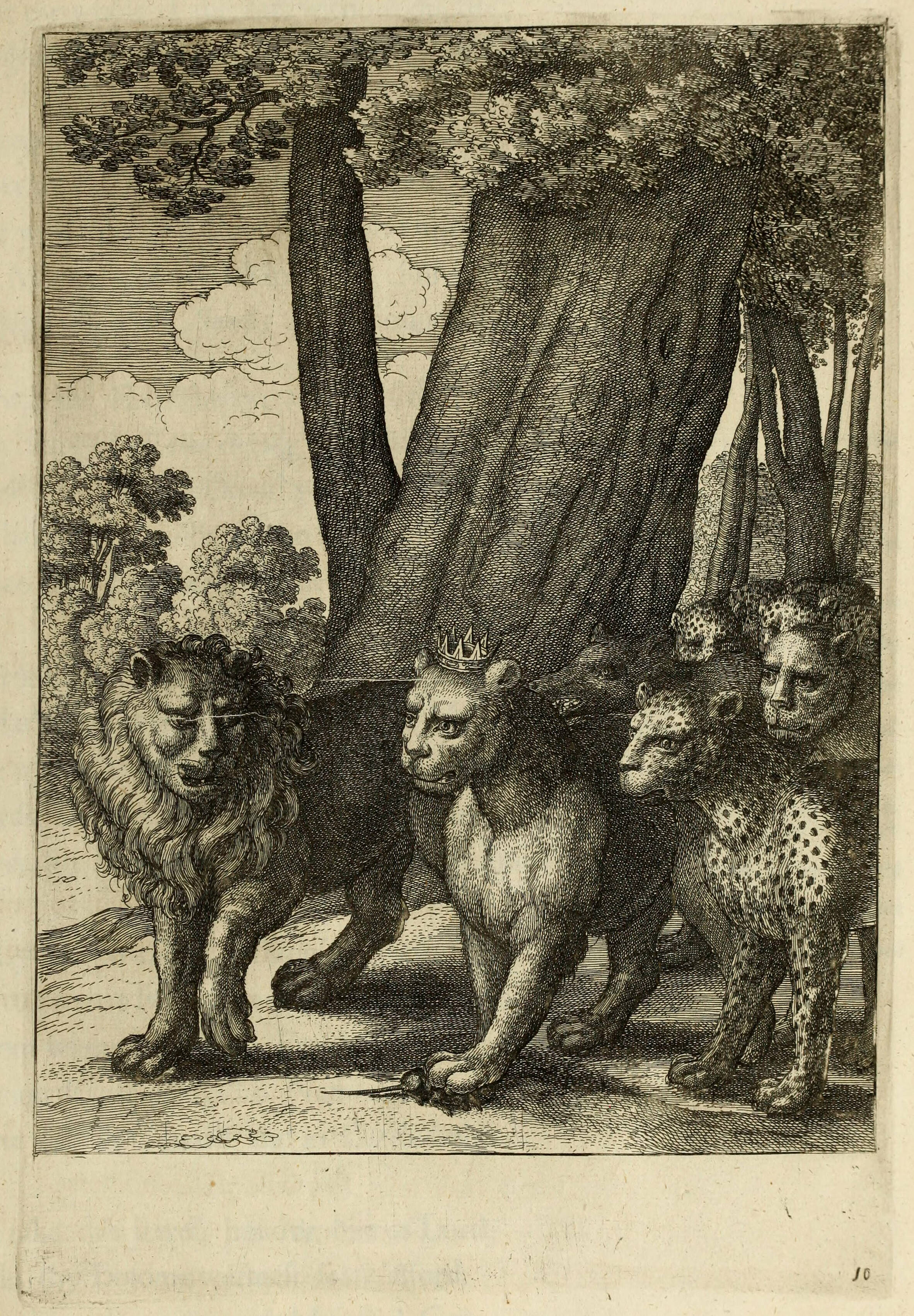
Fables of Aesop paraphras'd in verse : adorn'd with sculpture, and illustrated with annotations (1668). Ebook

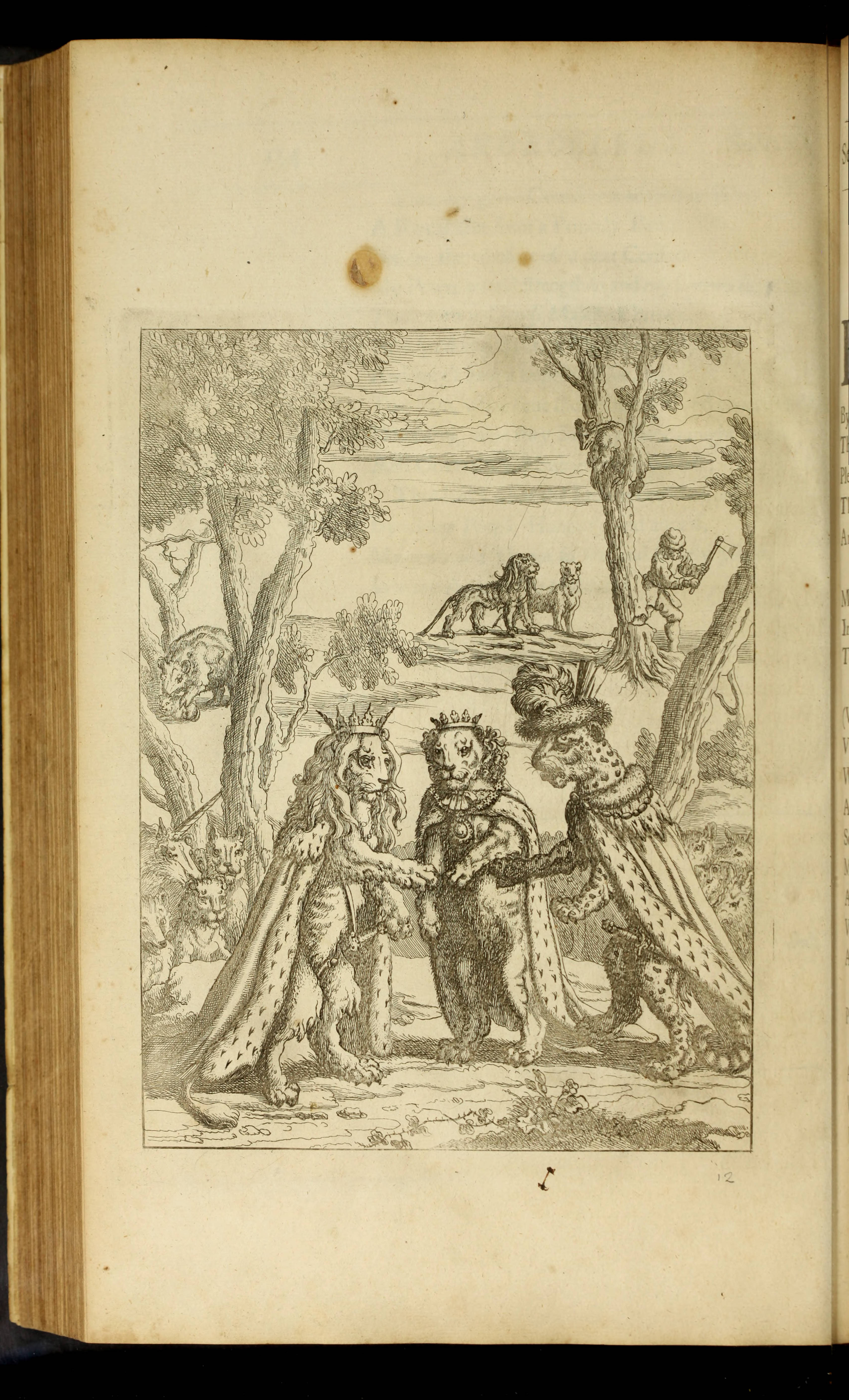
Fables of Aesop paraphras'd in verse : adorn'd with sculpture, and illustrated with annotations (1668). Ebook

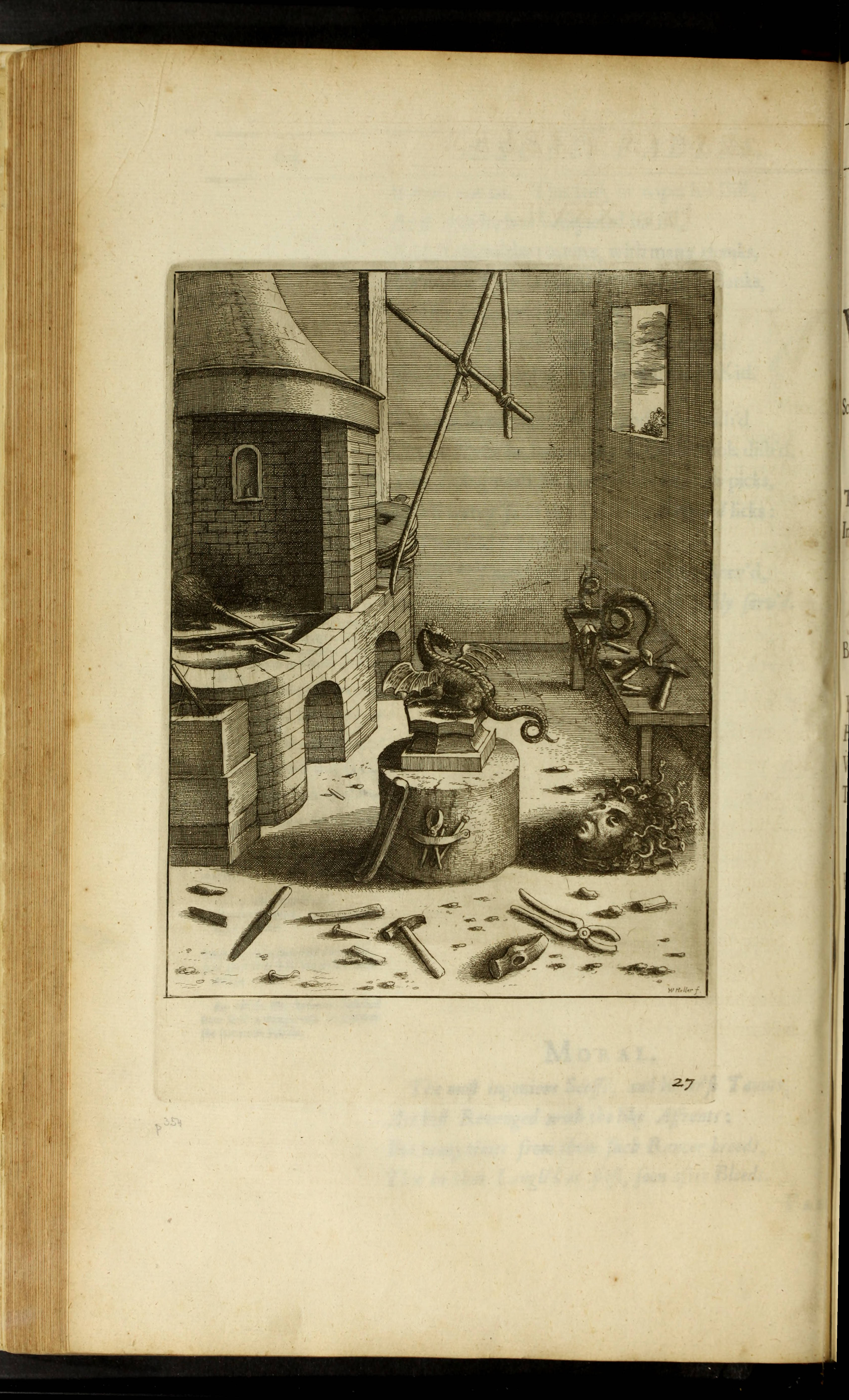
Fables of Aesop paraphras'd in verse : adorn'd with sculpture, and illustrated with annotations (1668). Ebook

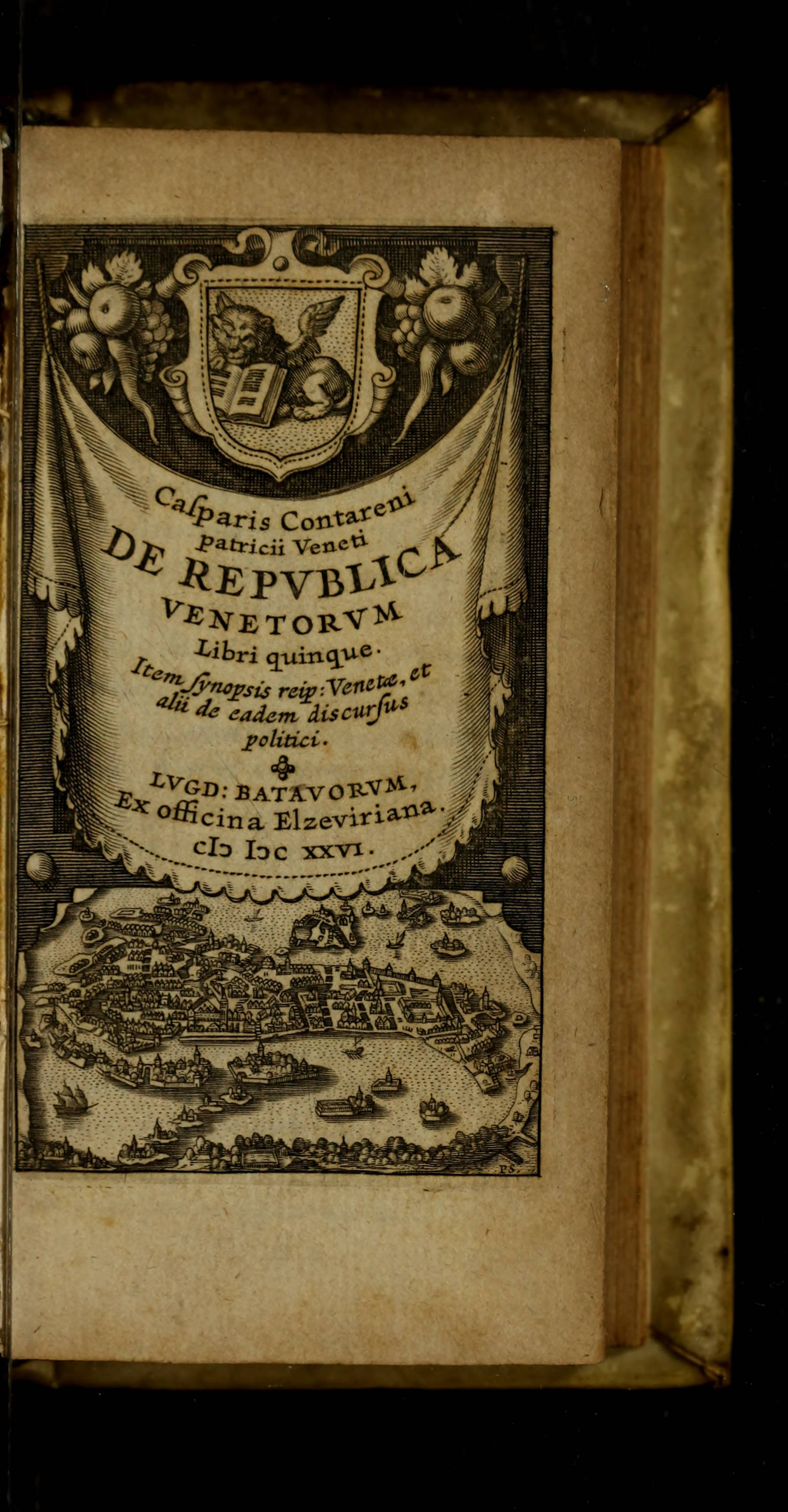
Casparis Contareni patricii Veneti De republica Venetorum libri quinque (1626). Ebook

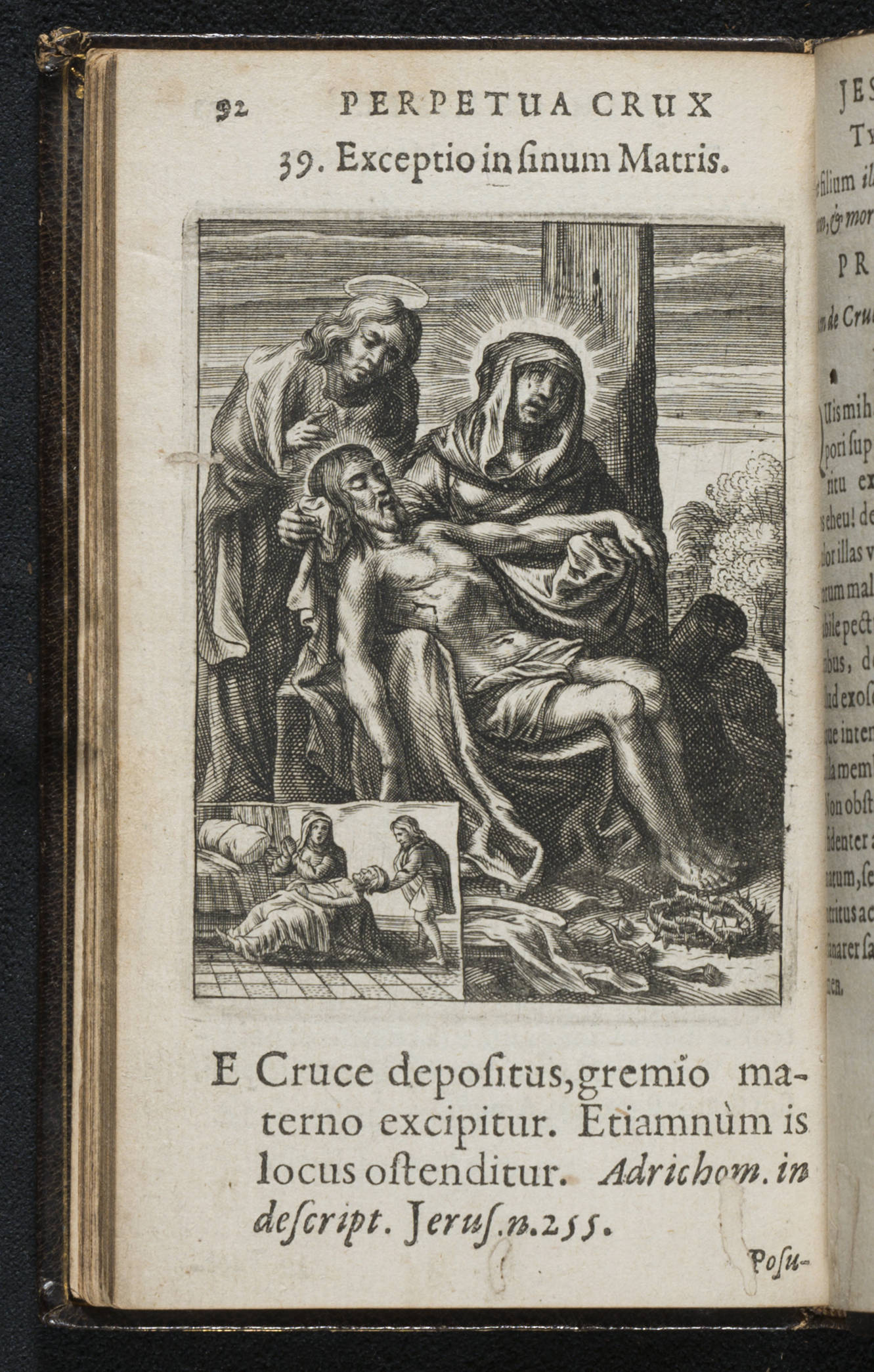
Perpetva crvx sive Passio Jesu Christi a puncto incarnationis ad extremum vitæ (1650). Ebook

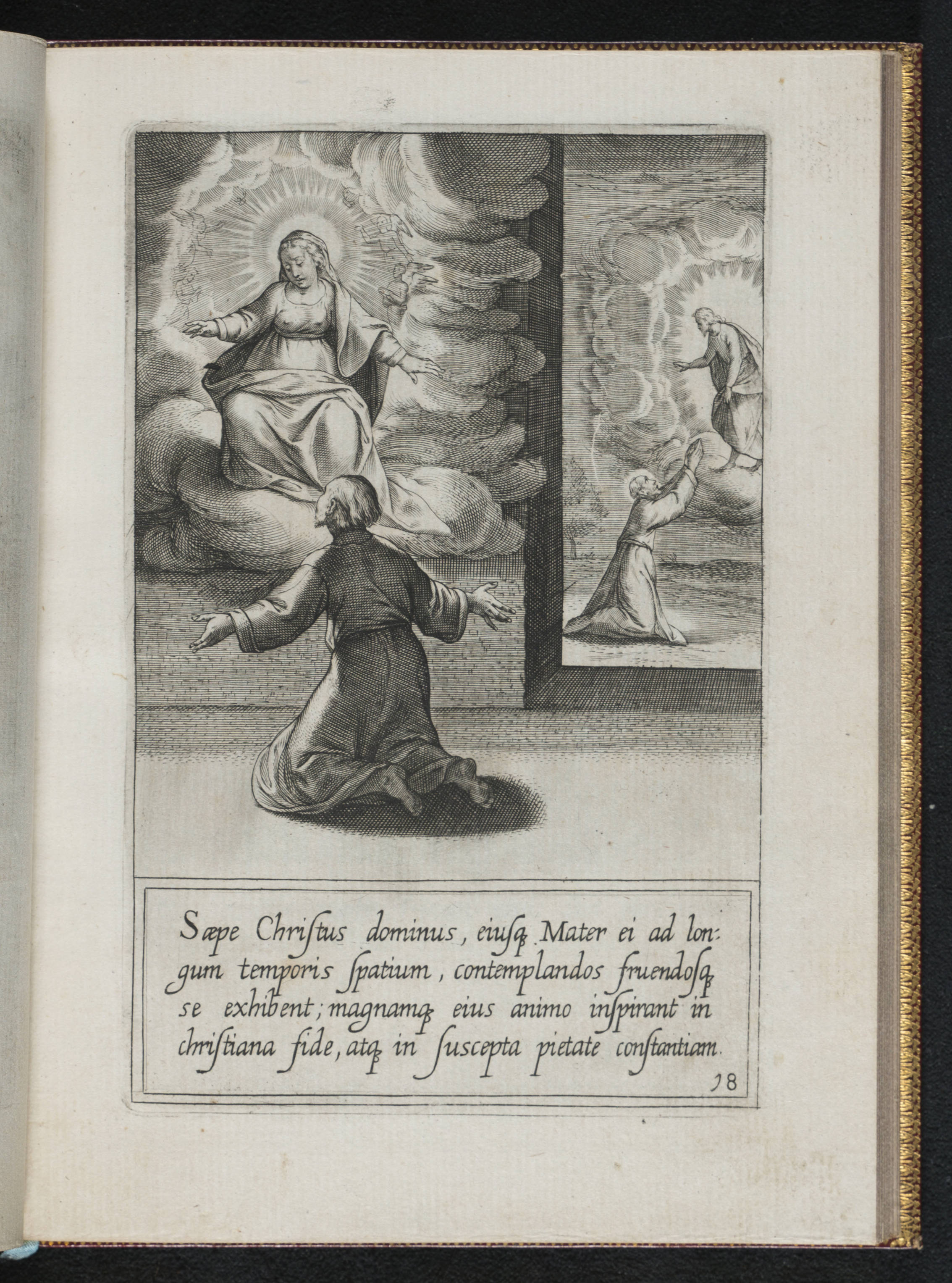
Vita beati P. Ignatii Loiolæ Societatis Iesv fvndatoris (1609). Ebook

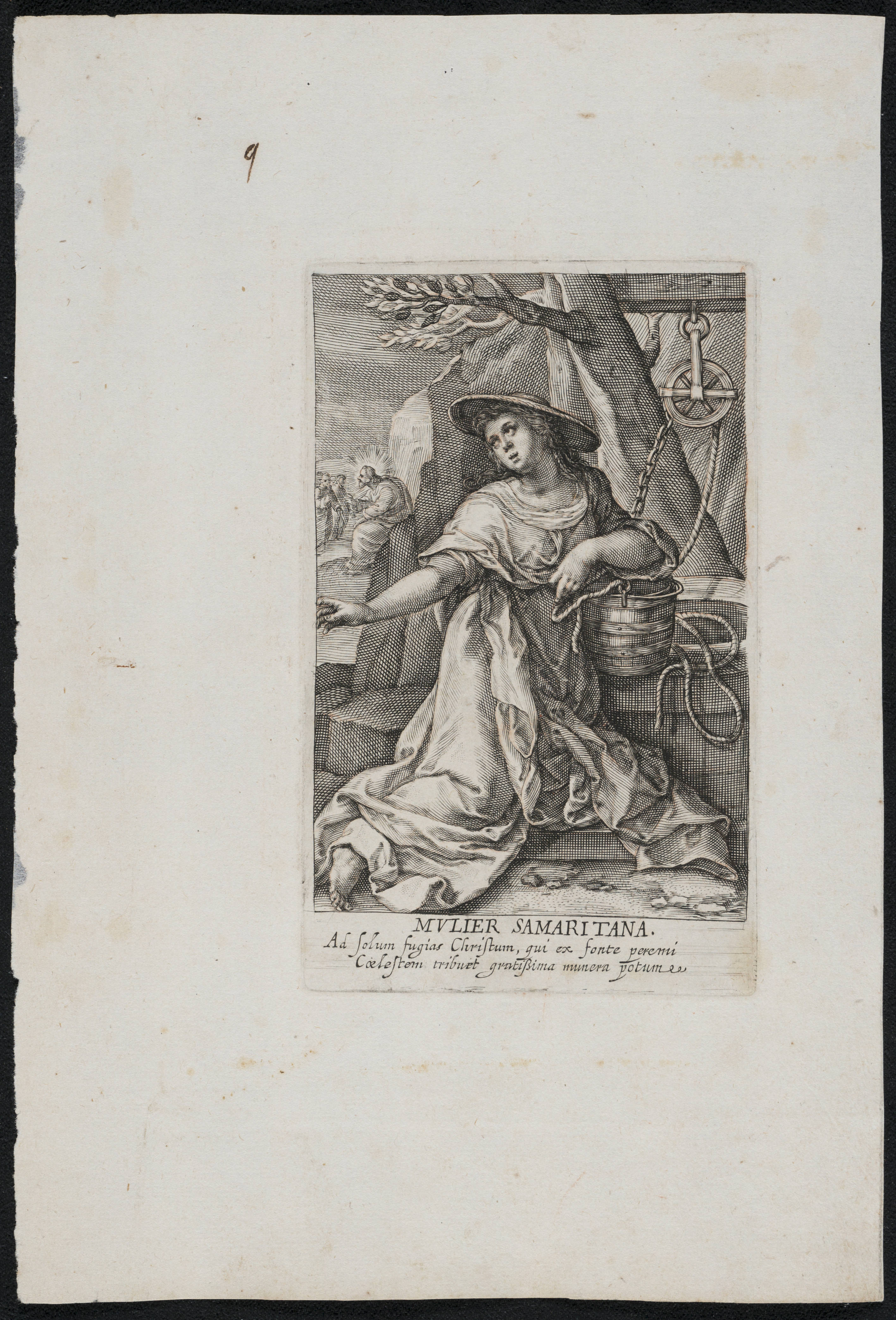
Nunquid voluntate velim morte iniqui, dicit Adonai Dominus (1600-1699). Ebook

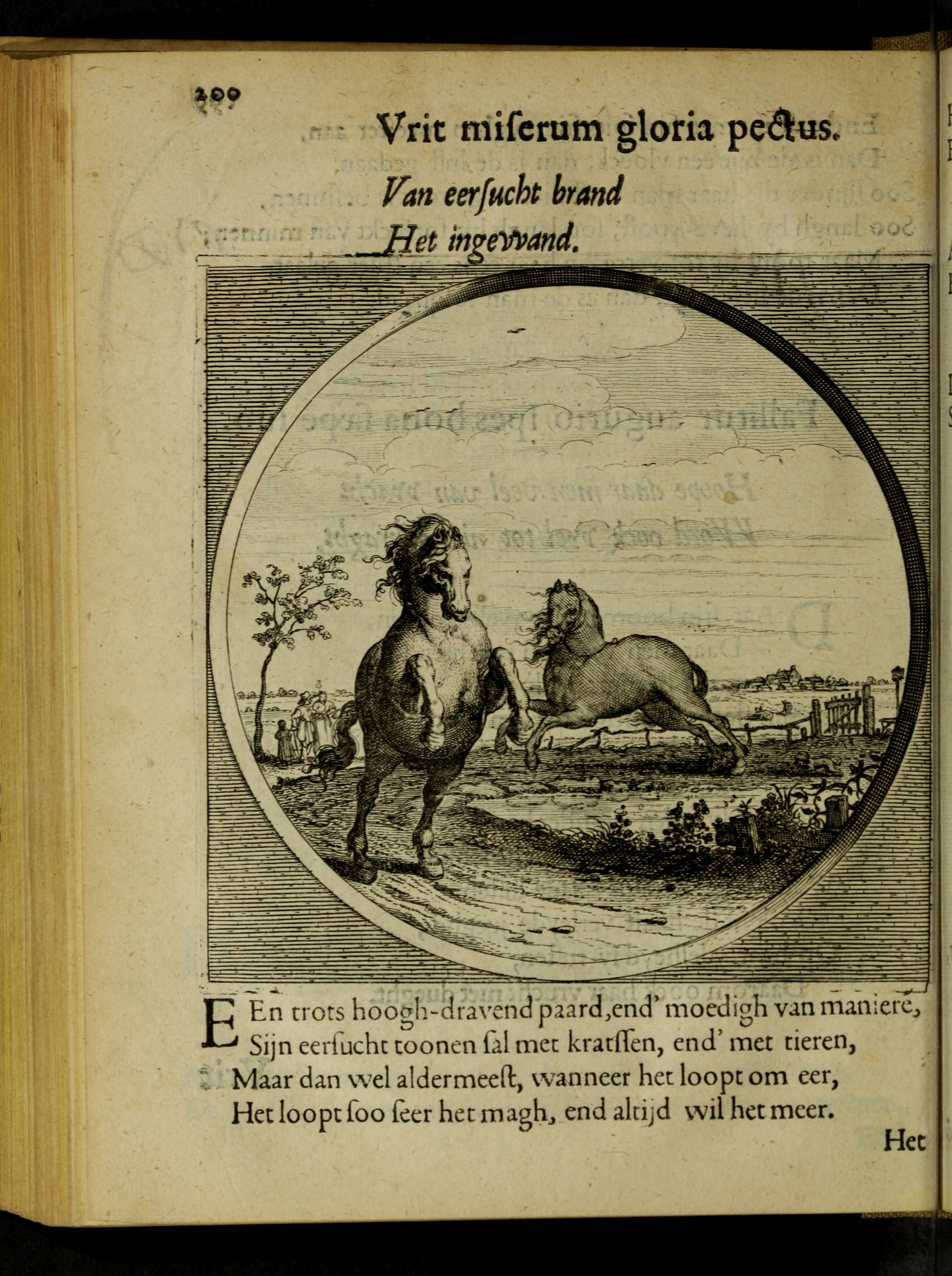
Nederduytsche poëmata (1635). Ebook

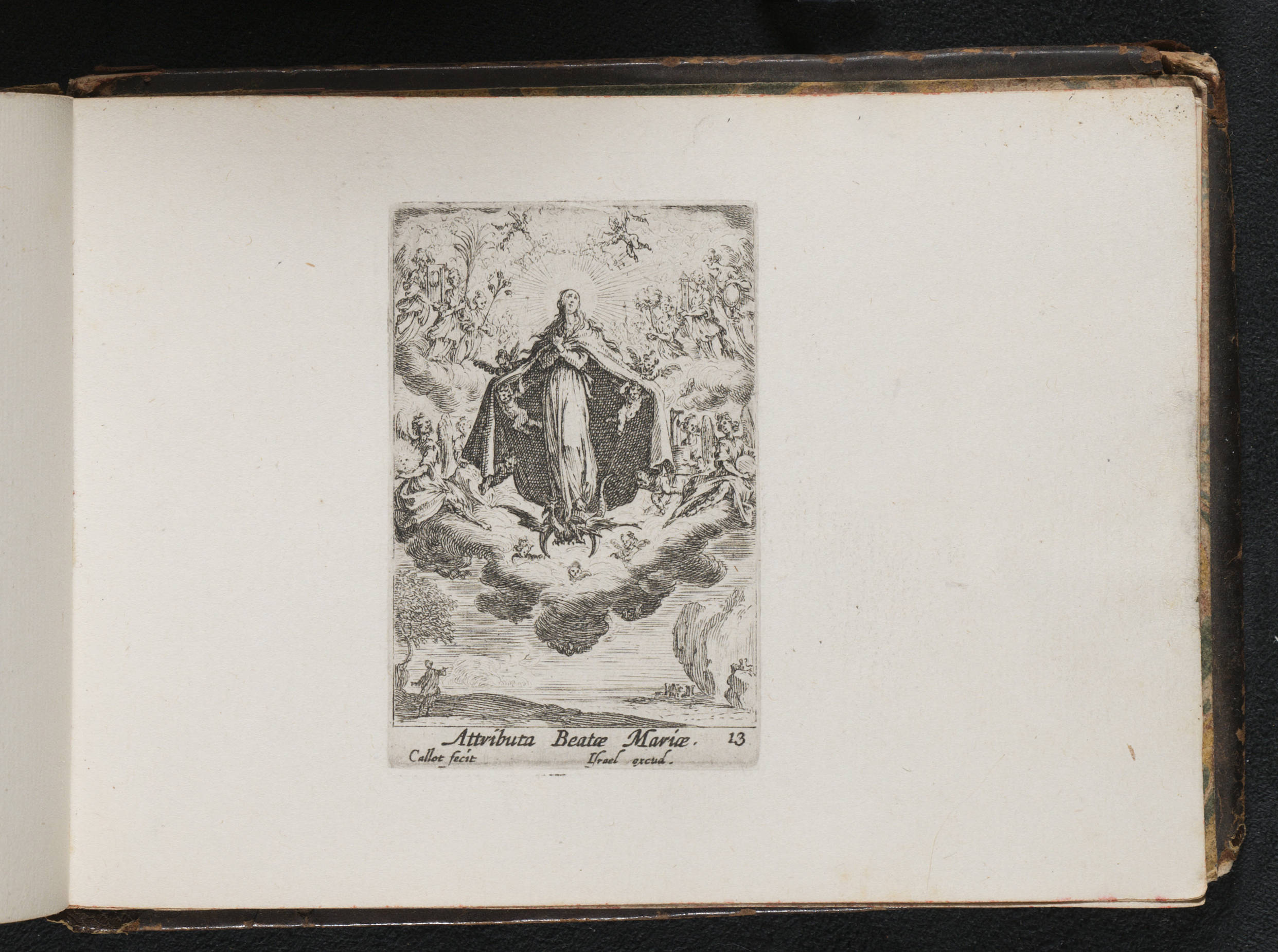
Vita beatæ Mariæ Vir[ginis] matris Dei, emblematib[us] delineata (1600-1699). Ebook

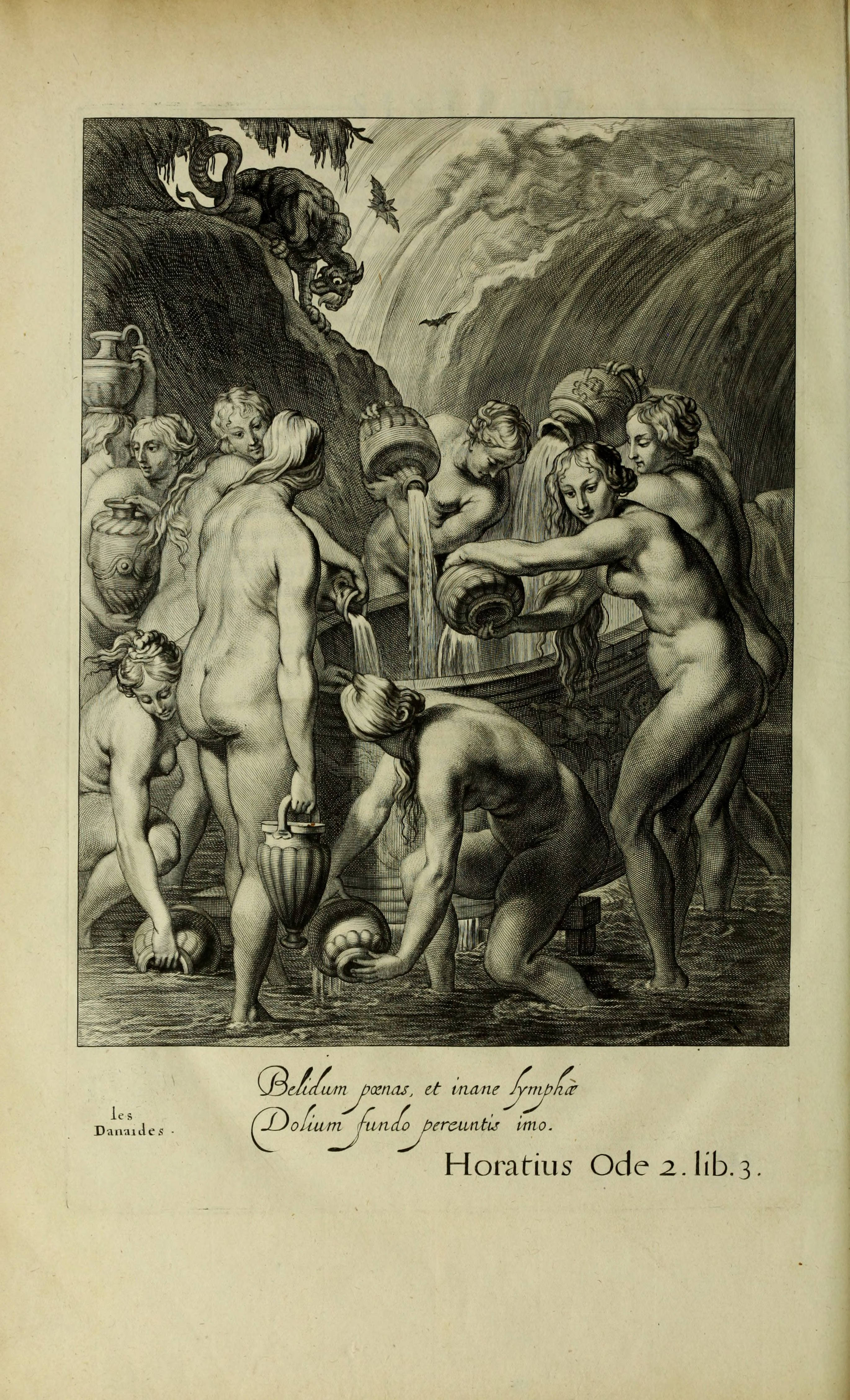
Tableaux du temple des muses (1655). Ebook

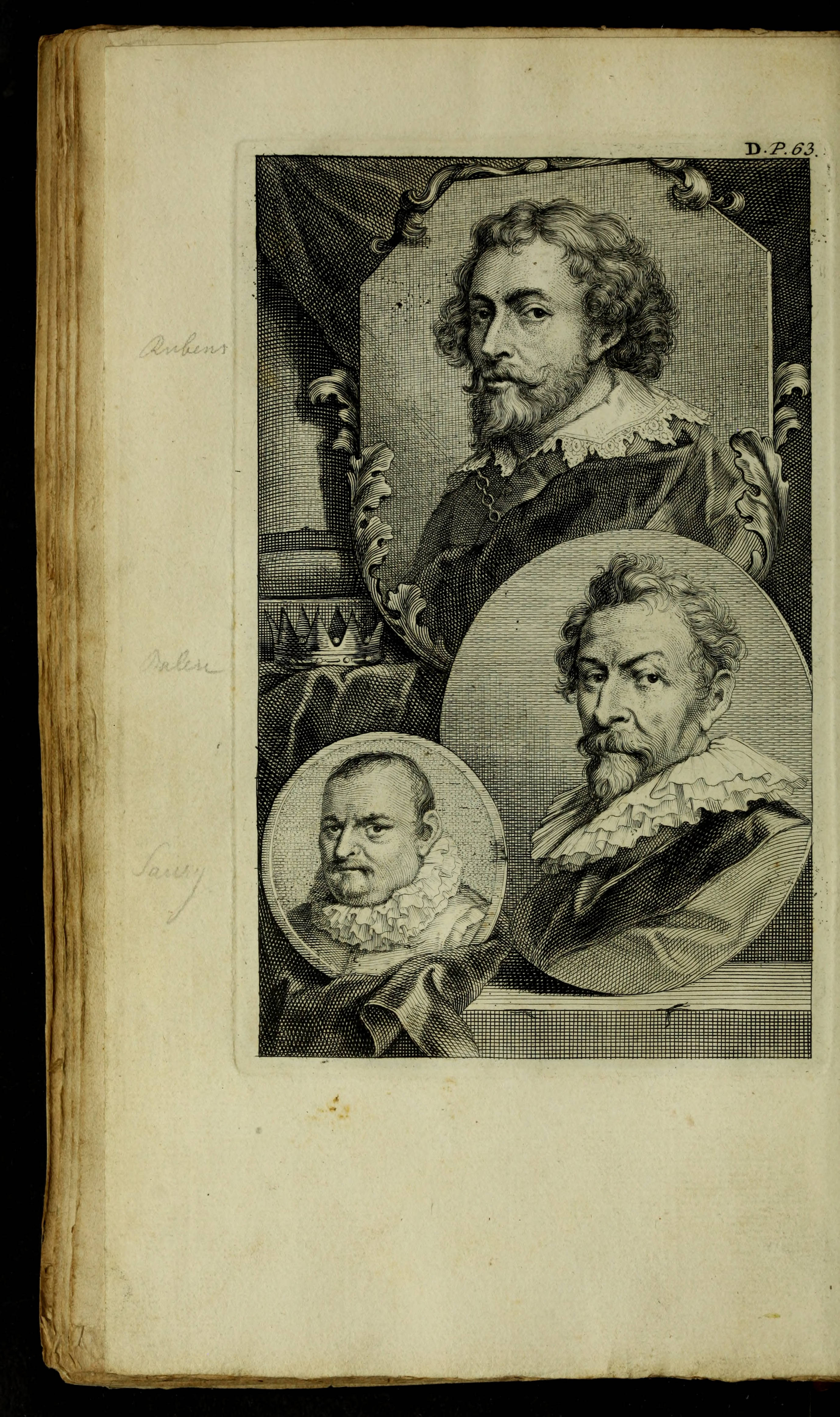
Groote schouburgh der Nederlantsche konstschilders en schilderessen. Het I.(1753). Ebook

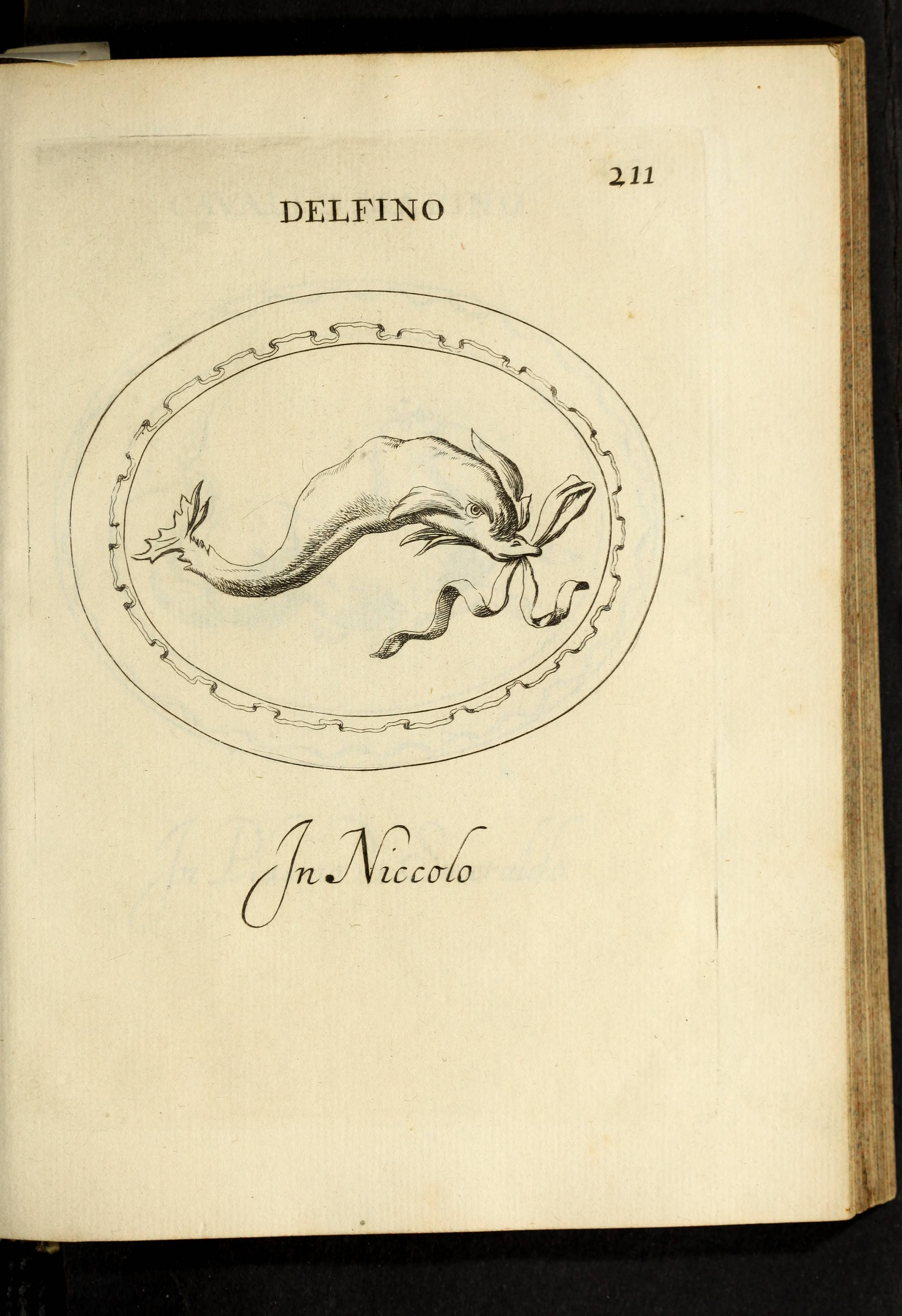
Gemmae et sculpturae antiquae depictae (1694). Ebook

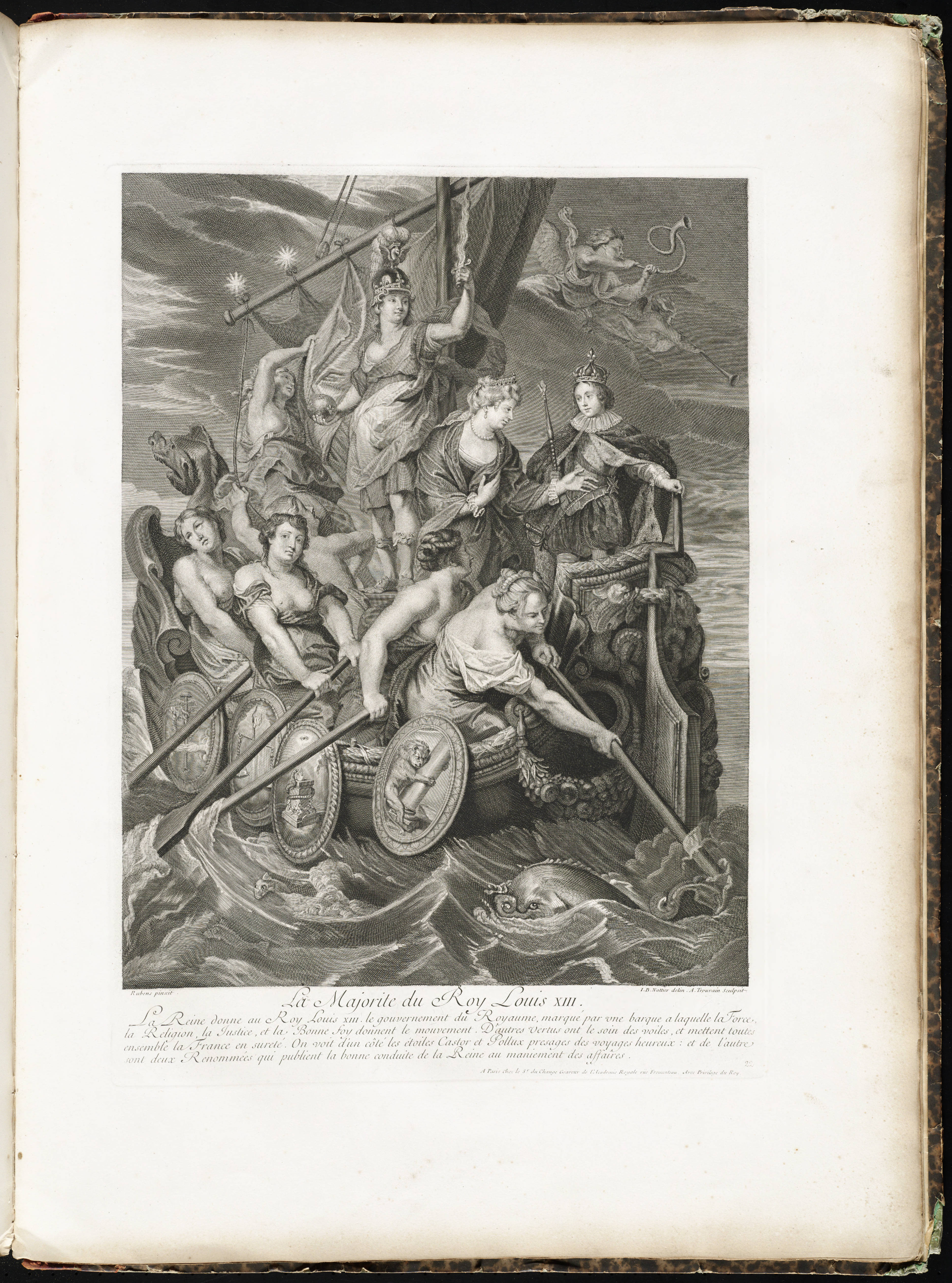
La Gallerie du Palais du Luxembourg (1710). Ebook

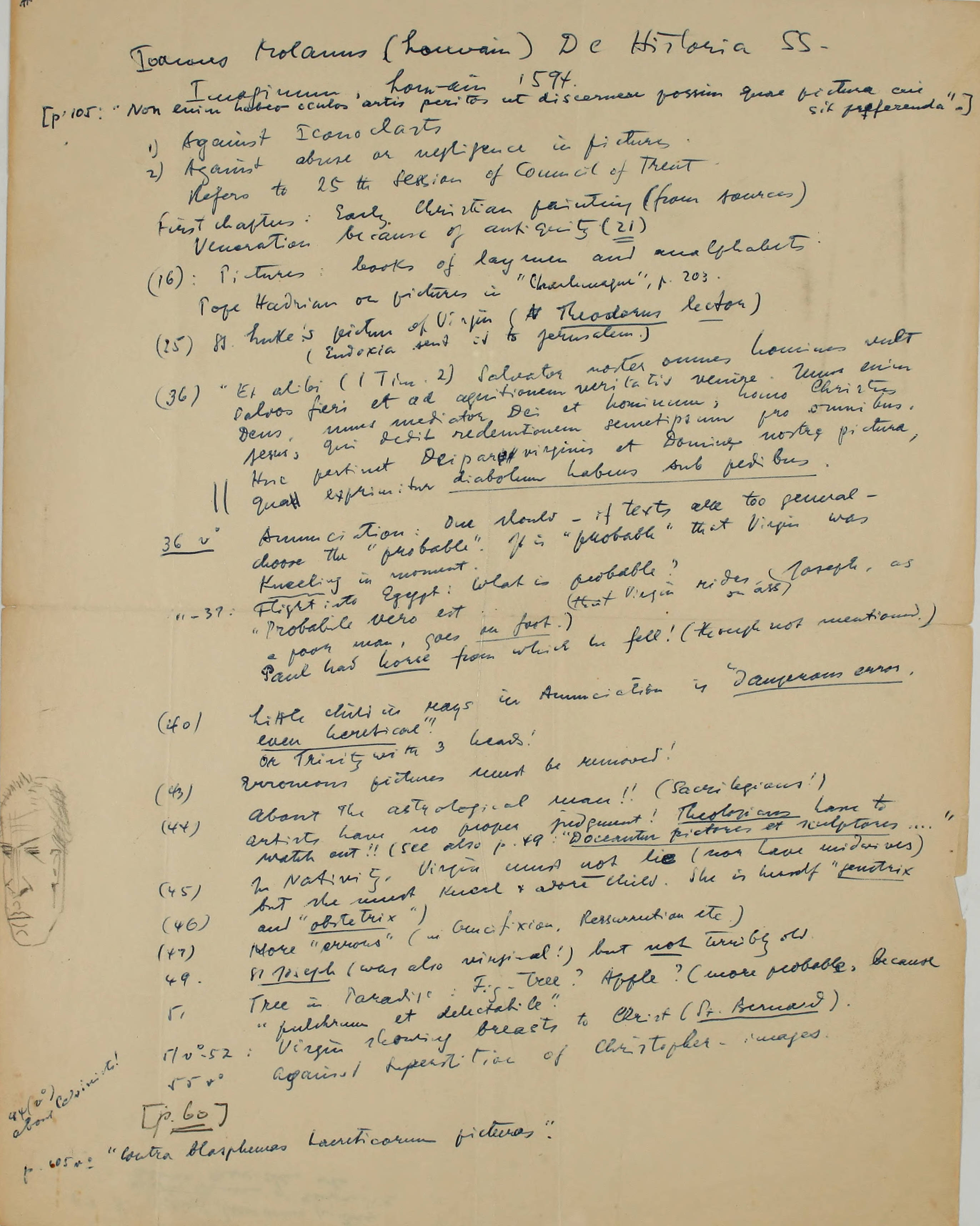
De historia ss. imaginvm et pictvrarvm pro vero earvm vsv contra abvsvs libri IV (1594). Ebook

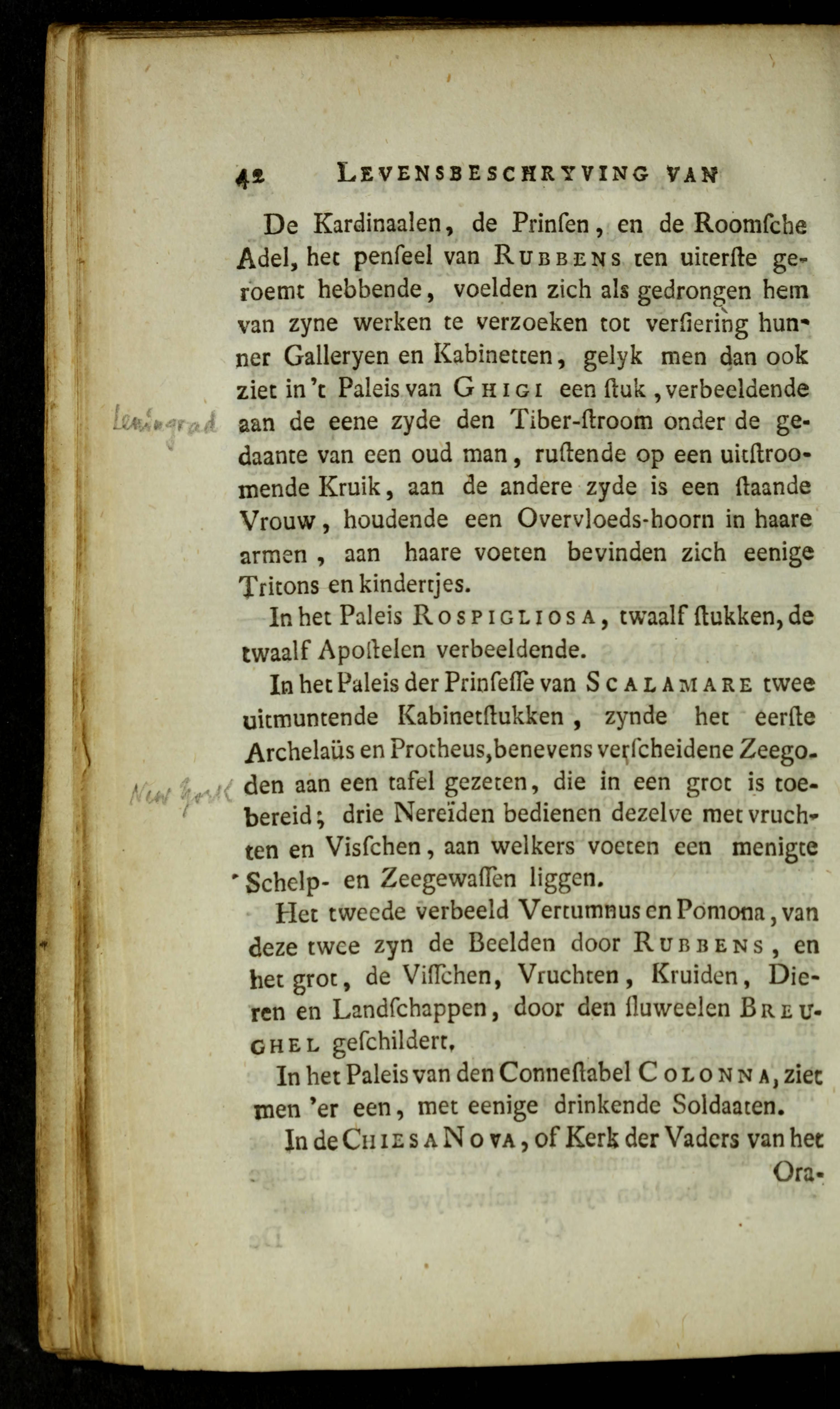
Historische levensbeschryving van Petrus Paulus Rubbens, ridder, heere van den steen &c. (1774). Ebook

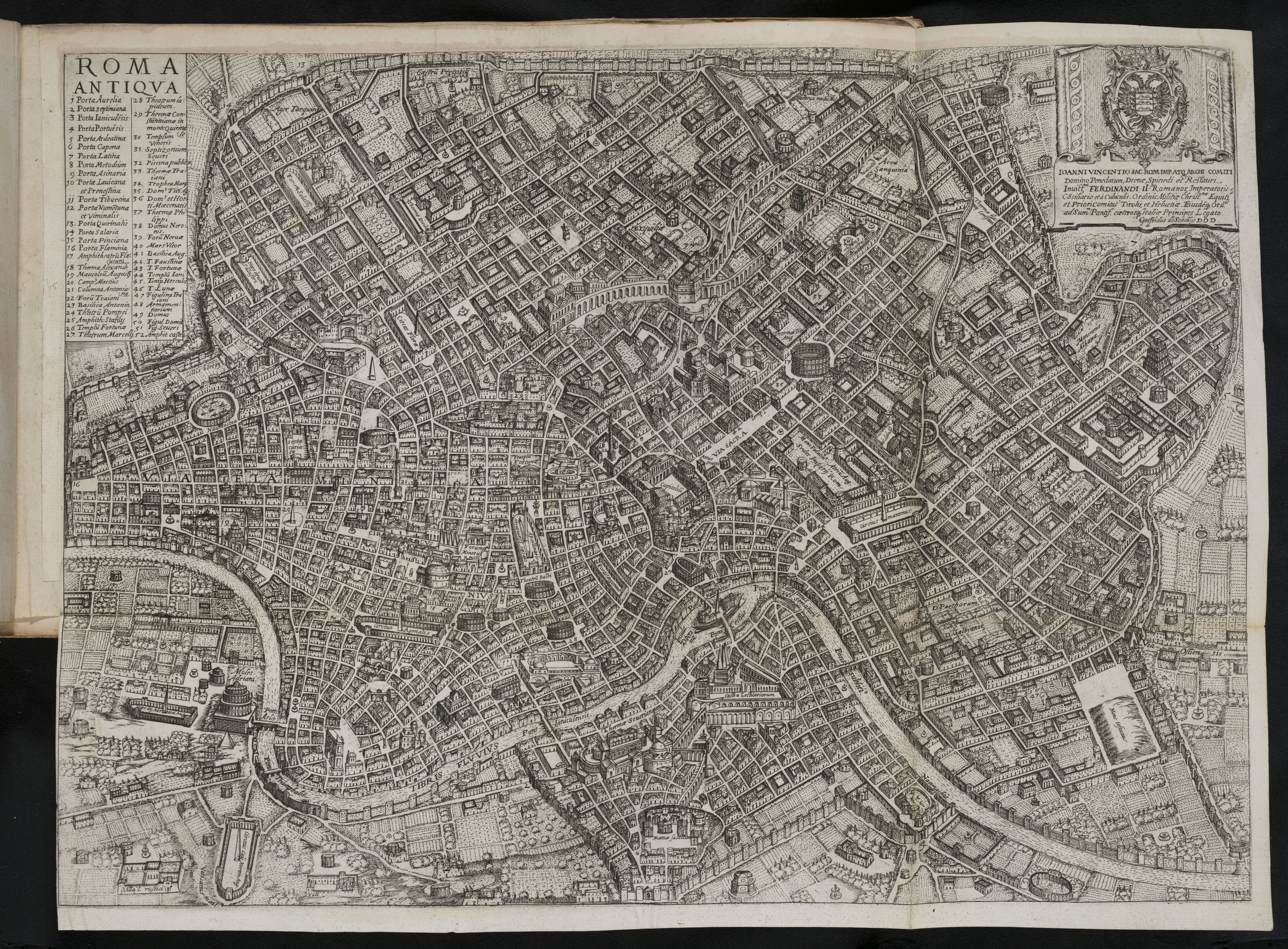
Vestigi dell'antichità di Roma (1618-1621). Ebook

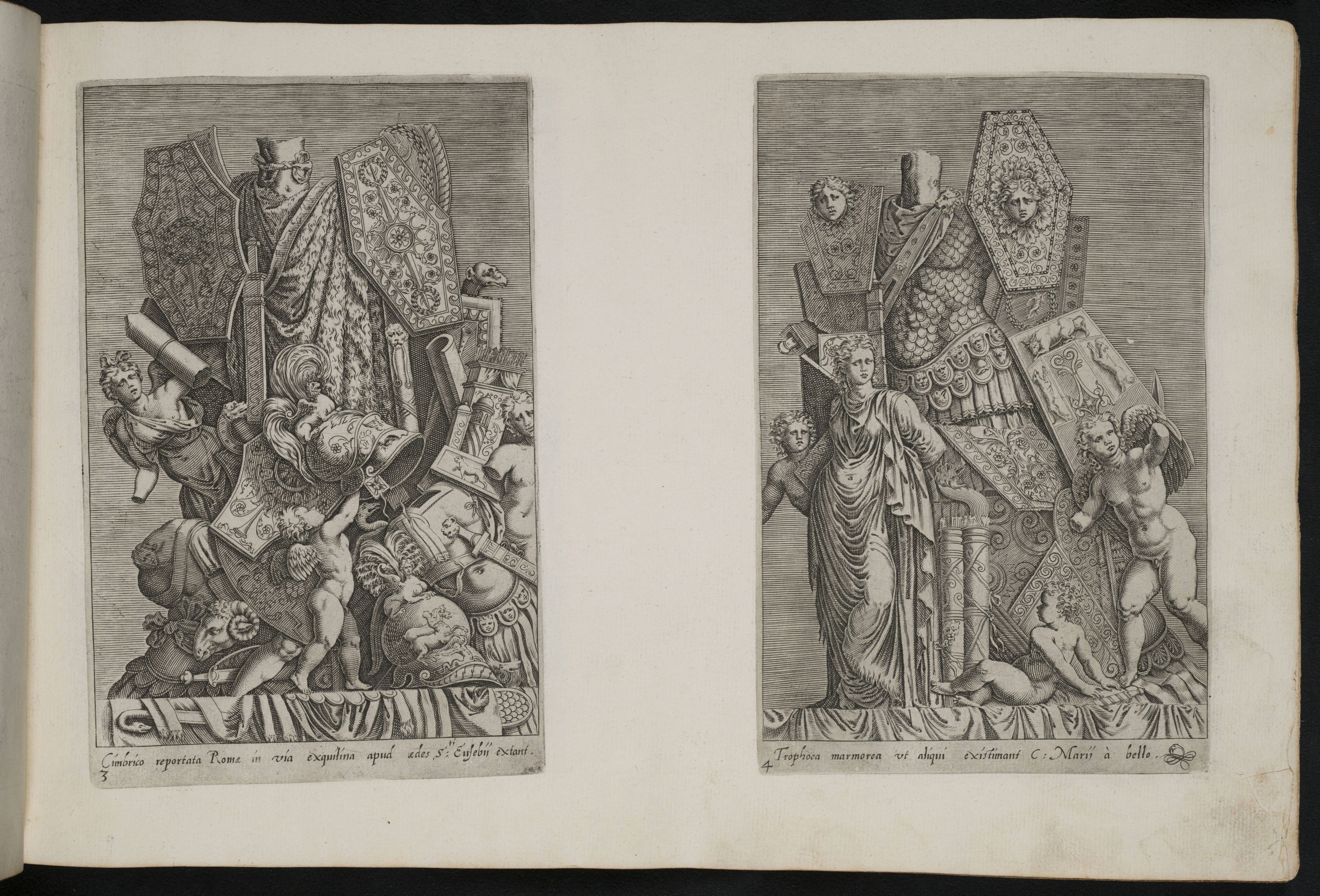
Vestigi dell'antichità di Roma (1618-1621). Ebook

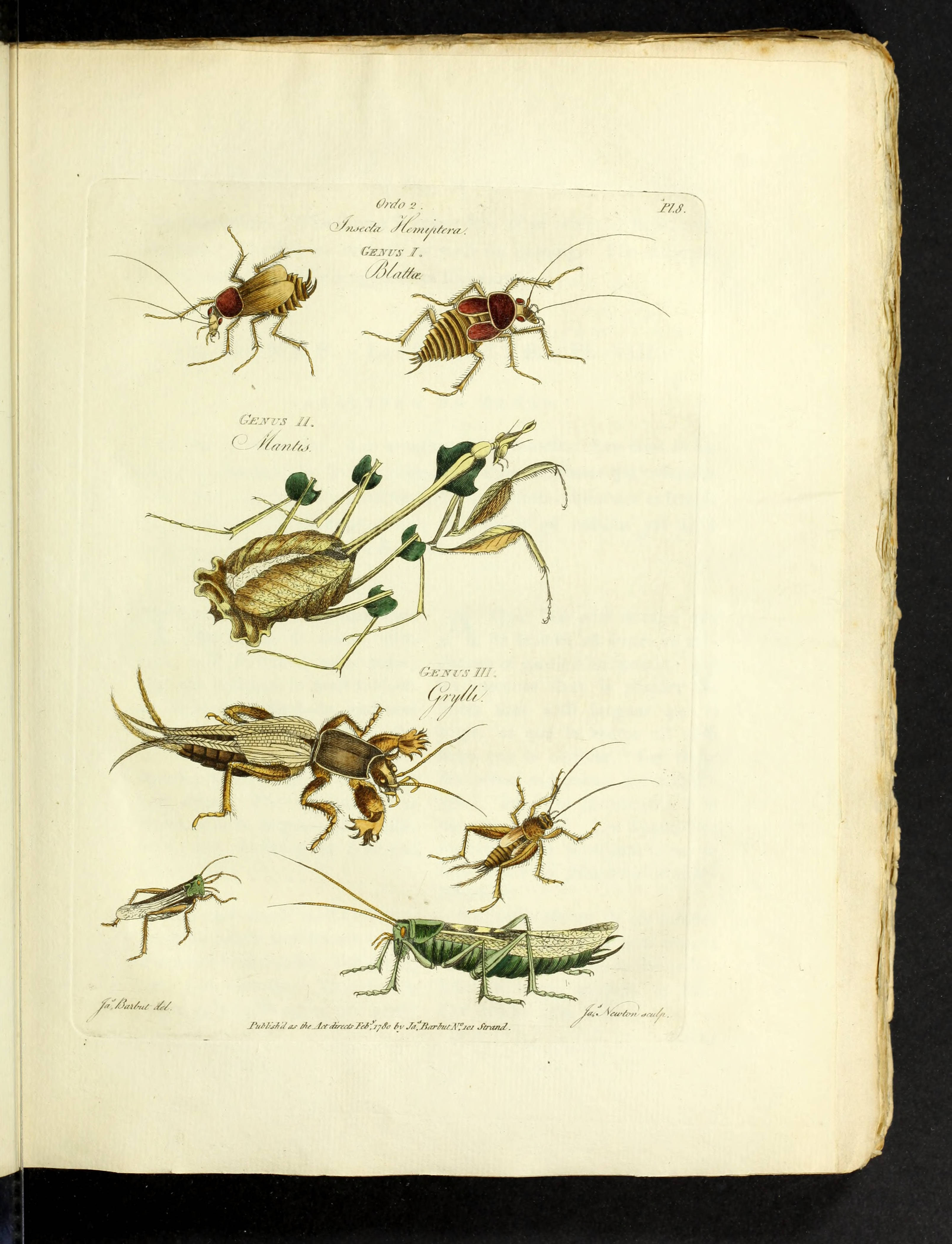
Les genres des insectes de Linné; constatés par divers échantillons d'insectes d'Angleterre, copiés d'après nature (1781). Ebook

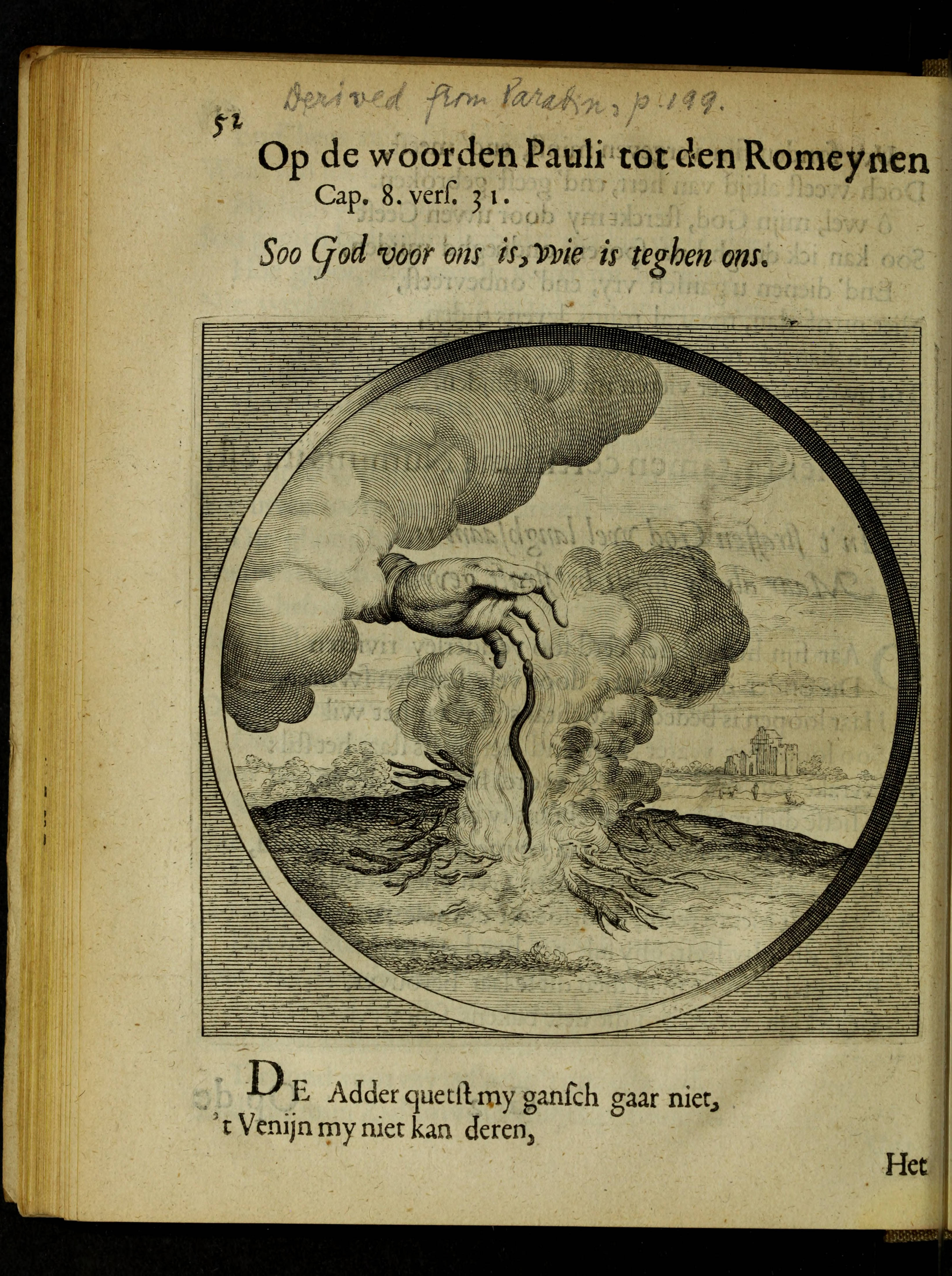
Nederduytsche poëmata (1635). Ebook

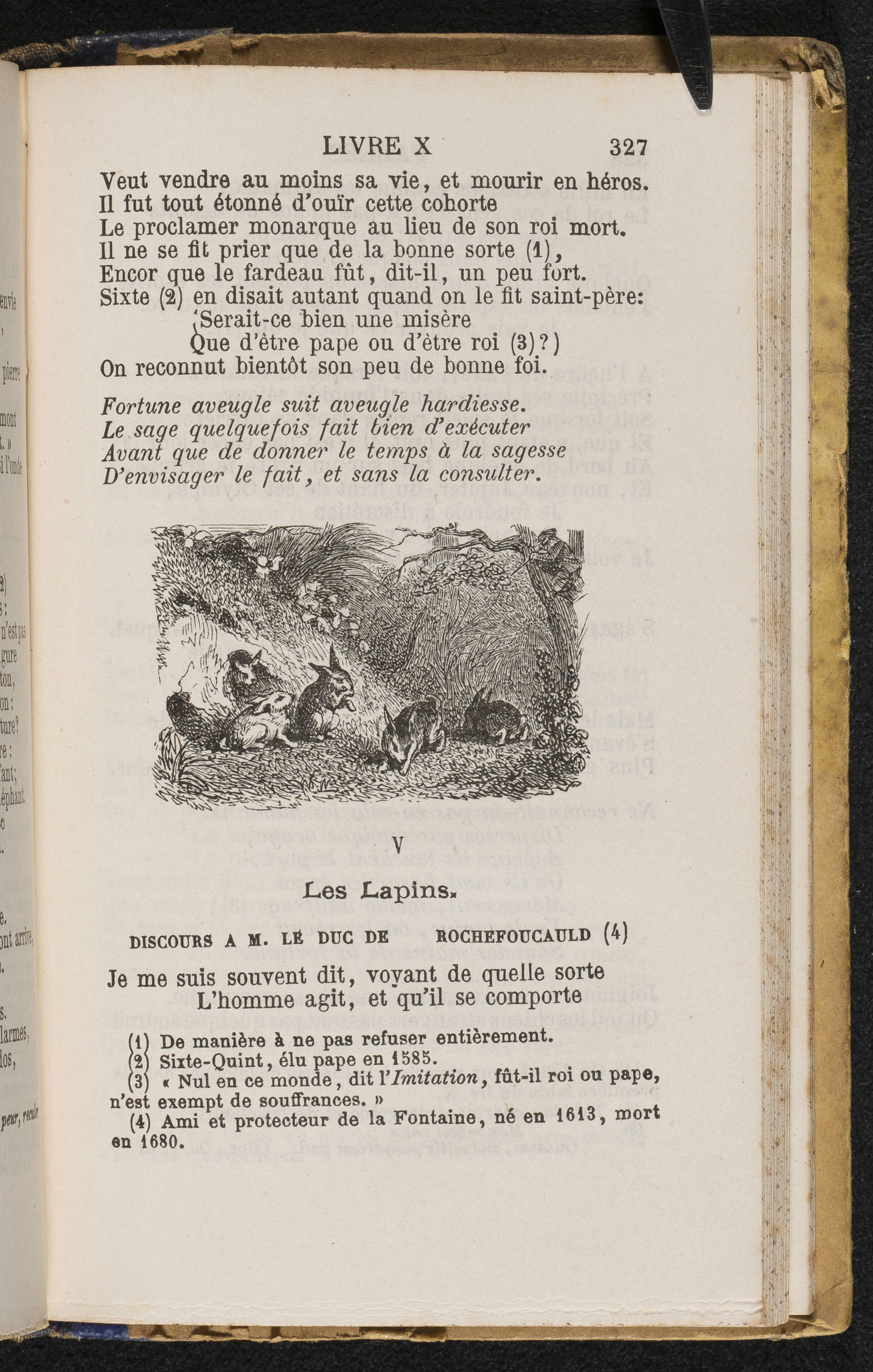
Fables de La Fontaine : précédées de la Vie d'Ésope (1882). Ebook

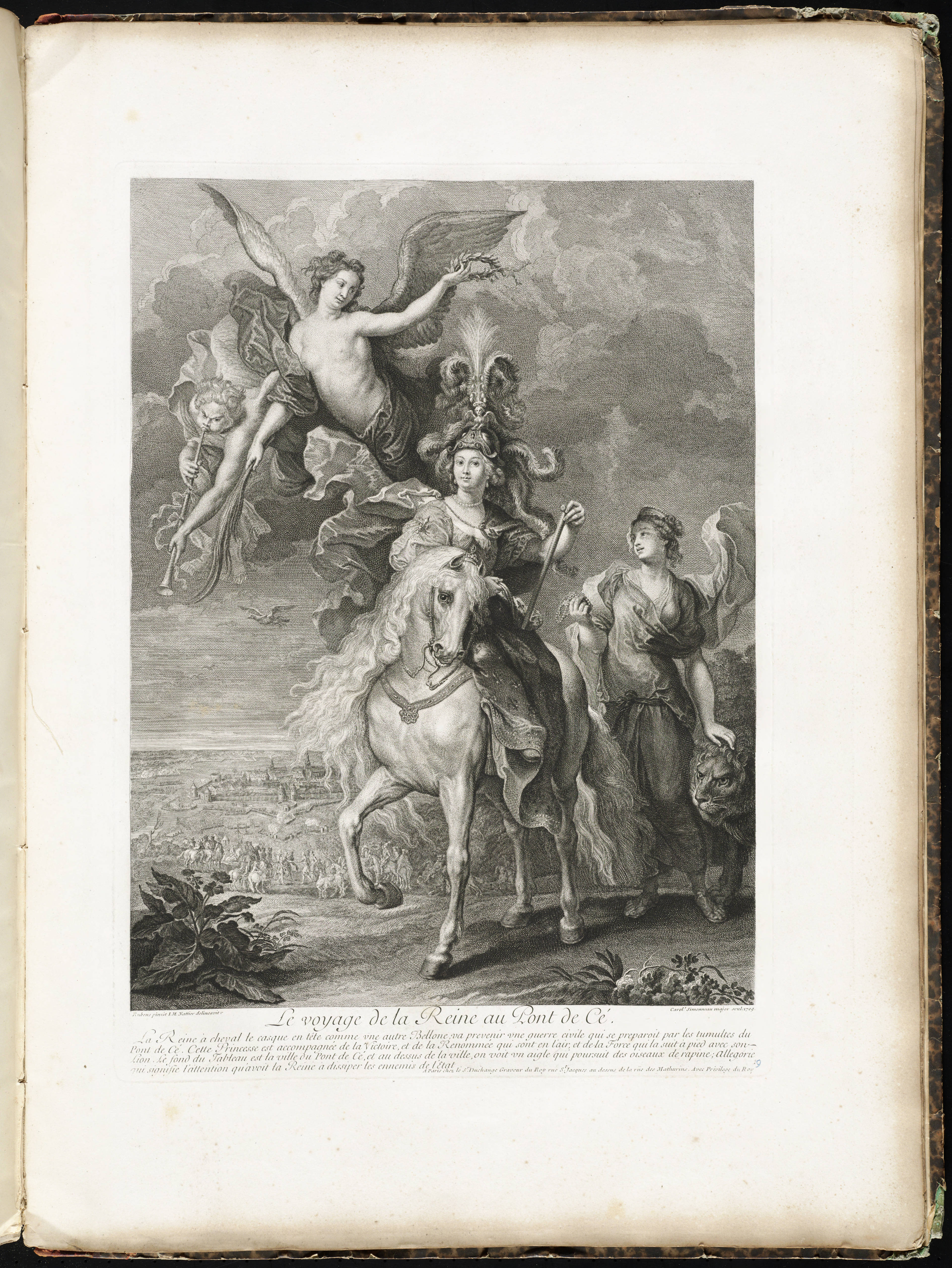
Gallerie du Palais du Luxembourg (1710). Ebook
