= George Vail =

American politician

Member of the U.S. House of Representatives from New Jersey's 4th district
- In office March 4, 1853 – March 3, 1857
- Preceded by: George H. Brown
- Succeeded by: John Huyler

Member of the New Jersey General Assembly
- In office 1843–1844

Personal details
- Born: July 21, 1809 Morristown, New Jersey
- Died: May 23, 1875 (aged 65) Morristown, New Jersey
- Party: Democratic
- Spouses: Mary A. Wilson (m. 1830–1855) Mary L. Lightfoot (m. 1856; div. 1857) Mary T. Lyman (m. 1862–1875)
- Relations: Frances Georgianna Vail, daughter Mary Louise Vail, son
- Profession: Blacksmith Engineer Manufacturer Politician

George Vail (July 21, 1809 – May 23, 1875) was an American Democratic Party politician who represented New Jersey's 4th congressional district in the United States House of Representatives from 1853 to 1857. His father Stephen Vail, and his brother Alfred Vail were the driving force behind the success of the Speedwell Iron Works. Father and sons assisted in the technical expertise and financial development of this family business. The Vail family contributions to mechanical inventions, early communication, transportation industry, and mass production placed Speedwell at the cutting edge of the Industrial Revolution in the United States.

== Biography ==
He was born in Morristown, New Jersey, on July 21, 1809, to Stephen Vail. His brother, Alfred Vail, partnered with Samuel Morse to invent the telegraph and the Morse Code.

He completed preparatory studies and attended The Morris Academy in Morristown. George Vail's cousin was Theodore Newton Vail, who became the first president of American Telephone & Telegraph

Vail was a member of the New Jersey General Assembly in 1843 and 1844, and was appointed by the Governor of New Jersey to represent the State at The Great Exhibition in London, England, in 1851. George Vail was an unsuccessful candidate for election in 1850 to the Thirty-second Congress. In a political cartoon, George was surrounded by tools, patterns and drawings, with the Iron Works smoking in the background. George Vail was elected as a Democratic Representative for Morristown, New Jersey, to the Thirty-third and Thirty-fourth Congresses, serving in office from March 4, 1853, to March 3, 1857.

After his end of term in Congress, Vail was appointed on February 3, 1858, by President James Buchanan, as consul to Glasgow, Scotland, then served until August 10, 1861. When Vail returned to the United States and settled in Morristown, New Jersey where he engaged in literary pursuits. Vail was also member of the Court of Pardons, and served as a Judge of the New Jersey Court of Errors and Appeals from 1865 to 1871, which was the State of New Jersey's highest Court of Law at the time. Vail died in Morristown, New Jersey, on May 23, 1875, and was interred there in the First Presbyterian Church Cemetery.

U.S. House of Representatives
Preceded by George Houston Brown	Member of the U.S. House of Representatives from New Jersey's 4th congressional district March 4, 1853 – March 3, 1857	Succeeded by John Huyler
