= Edward Young (disambiguation) =

Edward Young (1683–1765) was an English poet.

Edward Young may also refer to:

== Business and industry ==
- Edward Faitoute Condict Young (1835–1908), American banker
- Edward Lewis Young (1862–1940), American banker
- Edward Preston Young (1913–2003), British publisher, graphic designer and naval officer

== Politics and law ==
- Edward T. Young (1858–1940), American lawyer and politician
- Edward James Young (1878–1966), Canadian politician
- Hilton Young, 1st Baron Kennet (Edward Hilton Young, 1879–1960), British politician and writer
- Edward Lunn Young (1920–2017), U.S. representative from South Carolina

== Religion ==
- Edward Young (priest) (died 1705), English clergyman, dean of Salisbury, father of the poet
- Edward Young (bishop) (died 1772), English Anglican priest
- Edward Joseph Young (1907–1968), American theologian

== Others ==
- Ned Young (ca. 1762–1800), British sailor, HMS Bounty mutineer
- Edward B. Young (1835–1867), American Civil War sailor and Medal of Honor recipient
- Edward Young (baseball) (1913–1967), American Negro leagues baseball player
- Edward Young, Baron Young of Old Windsor (born 1966), private secretary to Queen Elizabeth II
- Edward Warren Young (1868–1926), American architect

== See also ==
- Ted Young (disambiguation)
- Ed Young (disambiguation)
