= Ed Young =

Ed Young may refer to:

- Ed Young (illustrator) (1931–2023), Chinese-born American illustrator and writer
- Homer Edwin Young (born 1936), known as Dr. Ed Young, senior pastor of the Second Baptist Church Houston
- Ed Young (Fellowship Church) (born 1961), pastor of Fellowship Church, son of Homer Edwin Young
- Ed Young (cricketer) (born 1989), English cricketer
- Ed Young (politician) (born 1978), American politician
- Ed Young (aircraft constructor), American homebuilt aircraft designer and builder, designer of the Young Skyheater
- Hugh Edwin Young (1917–2012), academic administrator in the University of Wisconsin System

== See also ==
- Edward Young (disambiguation)
- Ed Yong (born 1981), British science journalist
