= Stephen Vail =

American businessman (1780–1864)

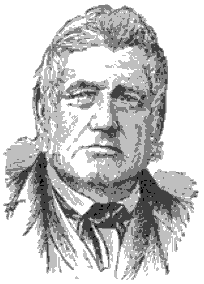
- Born: June 28, 1780; Malapardis, New Jersey
- Died: June/July 1864 (aged 83–84); Morristown, New Jersey
- Occupation: Businessman
- Spouses: Bethiah Youngs (m. 1801) Mary Carter Hedges (m. 1848) Phoebe Ann Miller (m. 1862)
- Children: Alfred Vail; George Vail; Harriet Vail; Sarah Louise Davis Vail

Stephen Vail (1780–1864) was a founding partner of the Baldwin Locomotive Works in Philadelphia and the creator of the Speedwell Ironworks in Morristown, New Jersey.

== Biography ==
Stephen Vail was born in Malapardis, New Jersey on June 28, 1780. He married Bethiah Youngs in 1801 and they had four children: Harriet Vail (1802–1828), Alfred Vail (1807–1859), George Vail (1809–1875), and Sarah Louise Davis Vail (1811–1887). He helped establish Speedwell Ironworks. His second wife was Mary Carter Hedges whom he married in 1848. His third wife was Phoebe Ann Miller whom he married in 1862.

He died in Morristown in June or July 1864. (Note: Sources disagree on the date. His gravestone shows July 12. The National Cyclopaedia of American Biography lists June 12. Contemporary newspaper articles list July 19 and July 26.)
