= Edward Faitoute Condict Young =

American politician

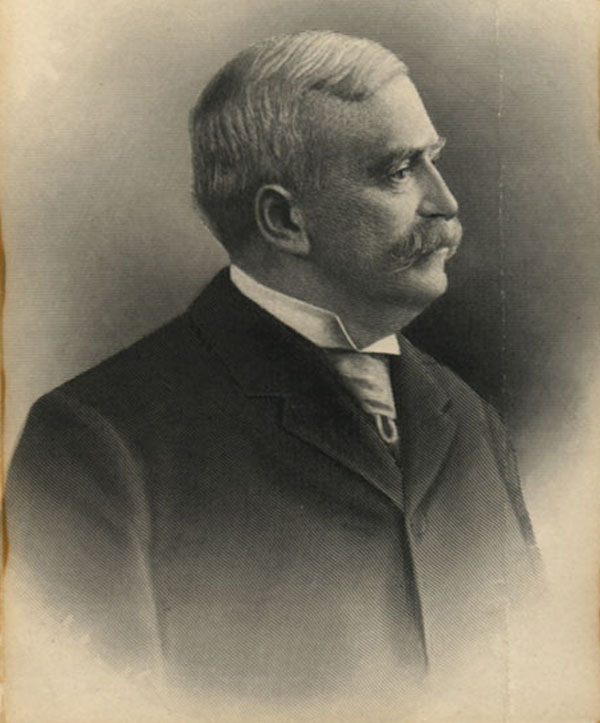
- Born: January 25, 1835; Malapardis, New Jersey
- Died: December 6, 1908 (aged 73); Jersey City, New Jersey
- Resting place: Bayview – New York Bay Cemetery
- Occupation(s): Banker, manufacturer, politician
- Spouse: Harriet M. Strober (m. 1854)
- Children: Edward L. Young; Hattie Louise Young Smith
- Parent(s): Eliza D. Benjamin Franklin Young
- Relatives: John Youngs, ancestor

Signature
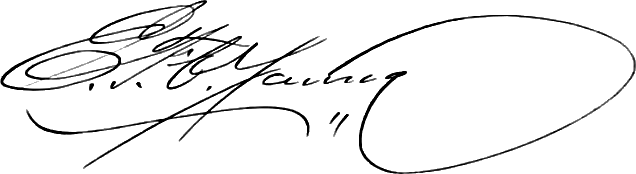

Edward Faitoute Condict Young (January 25, 1835 – December 6, 1908), or E.F.C. Young, was a banker, manufacturer and politician, who unsuccessfully sought the Democratic nomination for Governor of New Jersey in 1892. He was president of First National Bank in Jersey City until his death in 1908.

== Biography ==
Edward Faitoute Condict Young was born in Malapardis, New Jersey on January 25, 1835. He married Harriet M. Strober on July 26, 1854, and they had two children – Edward Lewis and Hattie Louise.

He was elected the City Treasurer of Jersey City from 1865 to 1870, and was a Jersey City alderman from 1872 to 1873. In 1874, he was elected to the Hudson County, New Jersey Board of Chosen Freeholders and in 1876 became the first director-at-large. He was a member of the New Jersey Democratic State Committee over several years. In 1887, he was appointed to the Tax Adjustment Commission and in 1899 was appointed to the New Jersey Railroad for a four-year term.

His estate on Hudson Boulevard (now John F. Kennedy Boulevard) would become the new of home of Saint Peter's University in 1936.

== Death ==
He became critically ill in June 1907, and he died in Jersey City on Sunday, December 6, 1908. He was buried in Bayview – New York Bay Cemetery. He was survived by his wife Harriet (1836-1924), daughter Hattie Louise Young Smith (1857-?), and son Edward Louis Young (1861-1940).
