= Ted Young =

Ted Young may refer to:

- Ted Young (journalist) (born 1961), British journalist and former editor of Metro
- Ted Young (politician), Fijian politician
- Ted Young (basketball) (born 1960), American basketball player

== See also ==
- Edward Young (disambiguation)
