= Alfred Vail =

19th-century American machinist and inventor

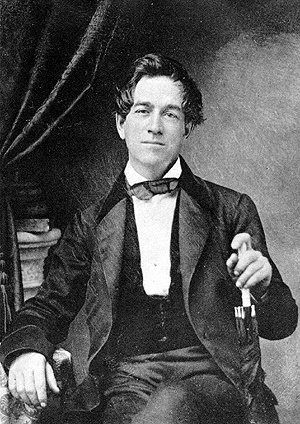
- Born: September 25, 1807; Morristown, New Jersey, US
- Died: January 18, 1859 (aged 51); Morristown, New Jersey, US
- Children: Stephen Vail
- Engineering career
- Discipline: Mechanical and electrical engineering
- Institutions: Magnetic Telegraph Company
- Projects: Telegraph, Morse code
- Significant design: Telegraph key, recording telegraph, "dot-and-dash" telegraph alphabet

Alfred Lewis Vail (September 25, 1807 – January 18, 1859) was an American machinist and inventor. Along with Samuel Morse, Vail was central in developing and commercializing American electrical telegraphy between 1837 and 1844. (Note: "Samuel F. B. Morse is known as the father of the American commercial telegraph, but he would not have succeeded without Alfred Vail as his partner. History glorifies Morse but credits little, or nothing, to Alfred. The reasons are complicated, unfair and more than a little sad." — Morristown N.J. parks (1980))

== Early life ==
Vail's parents were Bethiah Youngs (1778–1847) and Stephen Vail (1780–1864). Vail was born in Morristown, New Jersey, where his father was an entrepreneur and industrialist who built the Speedwell Ironworks into one of the most innovative iron works of its time. Their other son George Vail, Alfred's brother, was a noted politician.

Alfred attended public schools before taking a job as a machinist at the iron works. He enrolled in New York University to study theology in 1832, where he was an active and successful student and a member of the Eucleian Society, graduating in 1836.

== Involvement with Morse's telegraph ==
Visiting his alma mater on September 2, 1837, Vail happened to witness one of Samuel Morse's early telegraph experiments. He became fascinated by the technology and negotiated an arrangement with Morse to develop the technology at Speedwell Ironworks, at his own expense, in return for 25% of the proceeds. Alfred split his share with his brother George Vail. After having secured his father's financial backing, and being a skilled machinist, Vail refined Morse's crude prototype telegraph to make it suitable for public demonstration and commercial operation.

The first successful completion of a transmission with this system was at the Speedwell Iron Works on January 6, 1838, across two miles (3 km) of wire. The message read "A patient waiter is no loser." Over the next few months Morse and Vail demonstrated the telegraph to Philadelphia's Franklin Institute, members of Congress, and President Martin Van Buren and his cabinet. Demonstrations such as these were crucial to Morse's obtaining a Congressional appropriation of $30,000 to build his first line in 1844 from Washington to Baltimore.

Vail and Morse were the first two telegraph operators on Morse's first experimental line between Washington, D.C., and Baltimore, and Vail took charge of building and managing several early telegraph lines between 1845 and 1848. He was also responsible for several technical innovations of Morse's system, particularly the first sending key, which Vail invented, and improved recording registers and relay magnets. Vail left the telegraph industry in 1848 because he believed that the managers of Morse's lines did not fully value his contributions.

His last assignment, superintendent of the Washington and New Orleans Telegraph Company, paid him only $900 a year ($26,324 in 2024 US dollars), leading Vail to write to Morse,

I have made up my mind to leave the Telegraph to take care of itself, since it cannot take care of me. I shall, in a few months, leave Washington for New Jersey, ... and bid adieu to the subject of the Telegraph for some more profitable business.

== Retirement ==
When Morse took on an influential congressman as a partner, (Note: The congressman brought into Morse's company, gratis, as a partner was Francis Smith, the representative from Maine.) Morse cut the Vail brothers' share to one-eighth, although the other partners' shares were not reduced. Morse retained patent rights to all the apparatus and the alphabetic code-system that Vail had developed.

Vail retired from the telegraph operations in 1848 and moved back to Morristown, where he spent his last ten years researching genealogy. Since Alfred and his brother George shared a one-eighth interest in Morse's telegraph patents, Vail realized far less financial gain from his work on the telegraph than Morse and others.

His papers and equipment were subsequently donated by his son Stephen to the Smithsonian Institution and New Jersey Historical Society.

Alfred Vail's cousin, Theodore N. Vail, became the first president of American Telephone & Telegraph.

== Morse code ==
Alfred Vail and Samuel Morse collaborated in the invention of Morse code.

The "Morse code" that went into operational use after Vail had become involved was very different from Morse's original plan. (Note: In its own turn, the "American Morse code" they produced was only ever used by U.S. railroads, and was often called "the railroad code". It was quickly replaced everywhere outside U.S. railroads by the more robust / less critical "International Morse code" which remains in use as of the early 21st century, (although International Morse itself seems to be being supplanted in radio communication, by recent computer operated, weak-signal coding systems, such as WSPR and WSJT).) A controversy exists over the role of each in the invention. The argument for Vail being the original inventor is laid out by several scholars. (Note: "My attention has been called to a communication in The New York Times of June 7 headed Vail, father of the telegraph, and signed Stephen Vail. While I have no desire to enter into a newspaper controversy with Mr. Vail, and while I am sure that you have no desire to encourage one, I trust in justice to my father, Samuel F.B. Morse, you will allow me a few words in reply." — E.L. Morse (June 21, 1904) N.Y.Times) (Note: "Alfred Vail ... invented the new 'recording receiver', the 'sounding key', and the 'dot-and-dash' alphabet ... but doing his duty in strict accordance with his understanding of the terms of his contract, and that to Morse belonged all that he had accomplished." — S. Vail (June 25, 1904) N.Y.Times)

The argument offered by supporters of Morse claims that Morse originally devised a cipher code similar to that used in existing semaphore line telegraphs, by which words were assigned three- or four-digit numbers and entered into a code book. The sending operator converted words to these number groups and the receiving operator converted them back to words through the same code book.

Morse spent several months compiling this code dictionary. It is said by Morse supporters that Vail, in public and private writings, never claimed the code for himself. According to one researcher, in a February 1838 letter to his father, Judge Stephen Vail, Alfred wrote,

Professor Morse has invented a new plan of an alphabet, and has thrown aside the Dictionaries.

In an 1845 book Vail wrote describing Morse's telegraph, he also attributed the code to Morse. He died in 1859 at the age of 51.

== Recognition ==
A U.S. Army base was named in Vail's honor: Camp Vail in Eatontown, New Jersey, later temporarily renamed Fort Monmouth, was an Army housing complex.

After World War II the families of servicemen and civilian Army employees negotiated with the Army to purchase the development, which they incorporated as the "Alfred Vail Mutual Association". Due to the diligent efforts of the town clerk, the rights of the charter of the original Shrewsbury Township (est. 1693) were transferred to the residents. The housing development exists under that name to this day.

An elementary school in Morristown, New Jersey, near the site of the Speedwell Iron Works, is named Alfred Vail Elementary School in his honor.
