= George Houston Brown =

American judge

Member of the U.S. House of Representatives from New Jersey's 4th district
- In office March 4, 1851 – March 3, 1853
- Preceded by: John Van Dyke
- Succeeded by: George Vail

Personal details
- Born: February 12, 1810 Lawrenceville, New Jersey
- Died: August 1, 1865 (aged 55) Somerville, New Jersey
- Party: Whig
- Profession: Politician

George Houston Brown (February 12, 1810 – August 1, 1865) was an American Whig Party politician, who represented New Jersey's 4th congressional district in the United States House of Representatives from 1851 to 1853.

== Biography ==
Brown was born in the Lawrenceville section of Lawrence Township, Mercer County, New Jersey, on February 12, 1810. He attended the common schools and Lawrenceville Academy and graduated from Princeton College in 1828. He was a teacher in Lawrenceville Academy from 1828 to 1830. He studied law at Yale College for one year and also in a law office in Somerville, New Jersey, was admitted to the bar in 1835 and commenced practice in Somerville. He was a member of the New Jersey Legislative Council from 1842 to 1845, and was a delegate to the New Jersey constitutional convention in 1844.

Brown was elected as a Whig to the Thirty-second Congress, serving in office from March 4, 1851, to March 3, 1853, but was not a candidate for renomination in 1852.

After leaving Congress, he resumed the practice of law. He was associate justice of the New Jersey Supreme Court from 1861 until his death in Somerville, New Jersey, on August 1, 1865, where he was interred in the Somerville Old Cemetery.

U.S. House of Representatives
| Preceded by John Van Dyke | Member of the U.S. House of Representatives from New Jersey's 4th congressional district March 4, 1851 – March 3, 1853 | Succeeded by George Vail |
Political offices
| Preceded by Edward W. Whelpley | Justice of the Supreme Court of New Jersey; 1861–1865 | Succeeded by Joseph D. Bedle |
