= Washington and New Orleans Telegraph Company =

The Washington and New Orleans Telegraph Company was the second oldest telegraph company in the United States. It was incorporated in March 1847. Alfred Vail served as its superintendent until moving on in pursuit of a more lucrative post.

Smith Mowry of Charleston, South Carolina, a cotton factor, property owner and director on the boards of two railroad companies, served as president of the company.

North Carolina passed an act of incorporation encouraging construction of the company's Telegraph lines along railroad lines which were also rapidly being developed at the time. Design issues surfaced in the company's telegraph lines causing problems for the company.

A treasurer's report on the company was published in 1852. At the time, Amos Kendall was serving as treasurer. Benjamin Brown French was then the company's president.
