= Samuel Morse =

American inventor and painter (1791–1872)

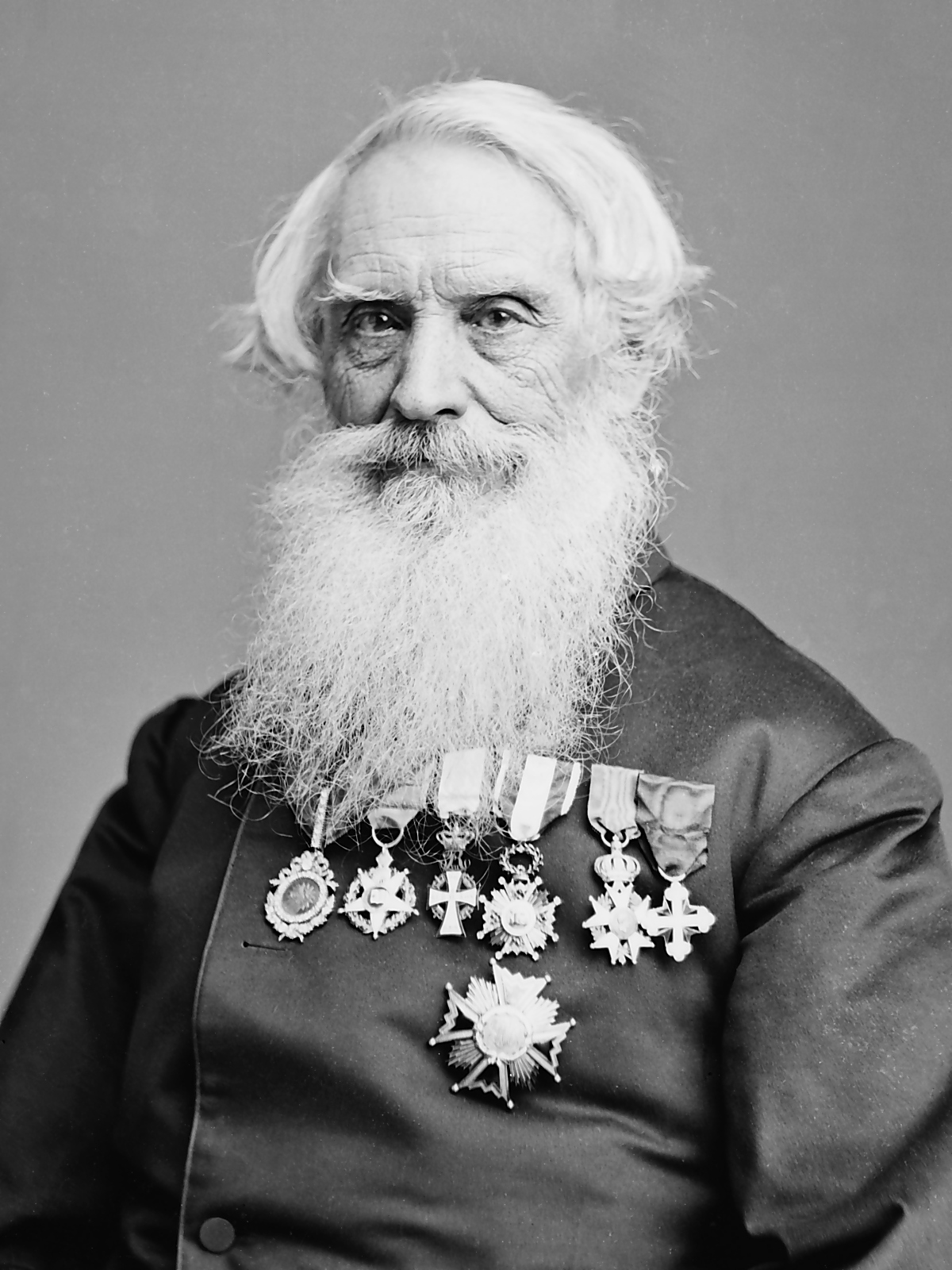
- Morse in 1866
- Born: Samuel Finley Breese Morse; April 27, 1791; Charlestown, Massachusetts, U.S.
- Died: April 2, 1872 (aged 80); New York City, U.S.
- Resting place: Green-Wood Cemetery
- Education: Yale University (BA); Royal Academy of Arts
- Occupations: Inventor; painter
- Known for: Morse code
- Spouses: Lucretia Pickering Walker (m. 1818; died 1825) Sarah Elizabeth Griswold (m. 1848)
- Children: 7 (3 with Lucretia; 4 with Sarah)
- Father: Jedidiah Morse
- Relatives: Sidney Edwards Morse (brother); Samuel Finley Brown Morse (distant cousin)

Samuel Finley Breese Morse (April 27, 1791 – April 2, 1872) was an American inventor and painter. After establishing his reputation as a portrait painter, Morse, in his middle age, contributed to the invention of a single-wire telegraph system based on European telegraphs. He was a co-developer and the namesake of Morse code in 1837 and helped to develop the commercial use of telegraphy.

== Early life ==
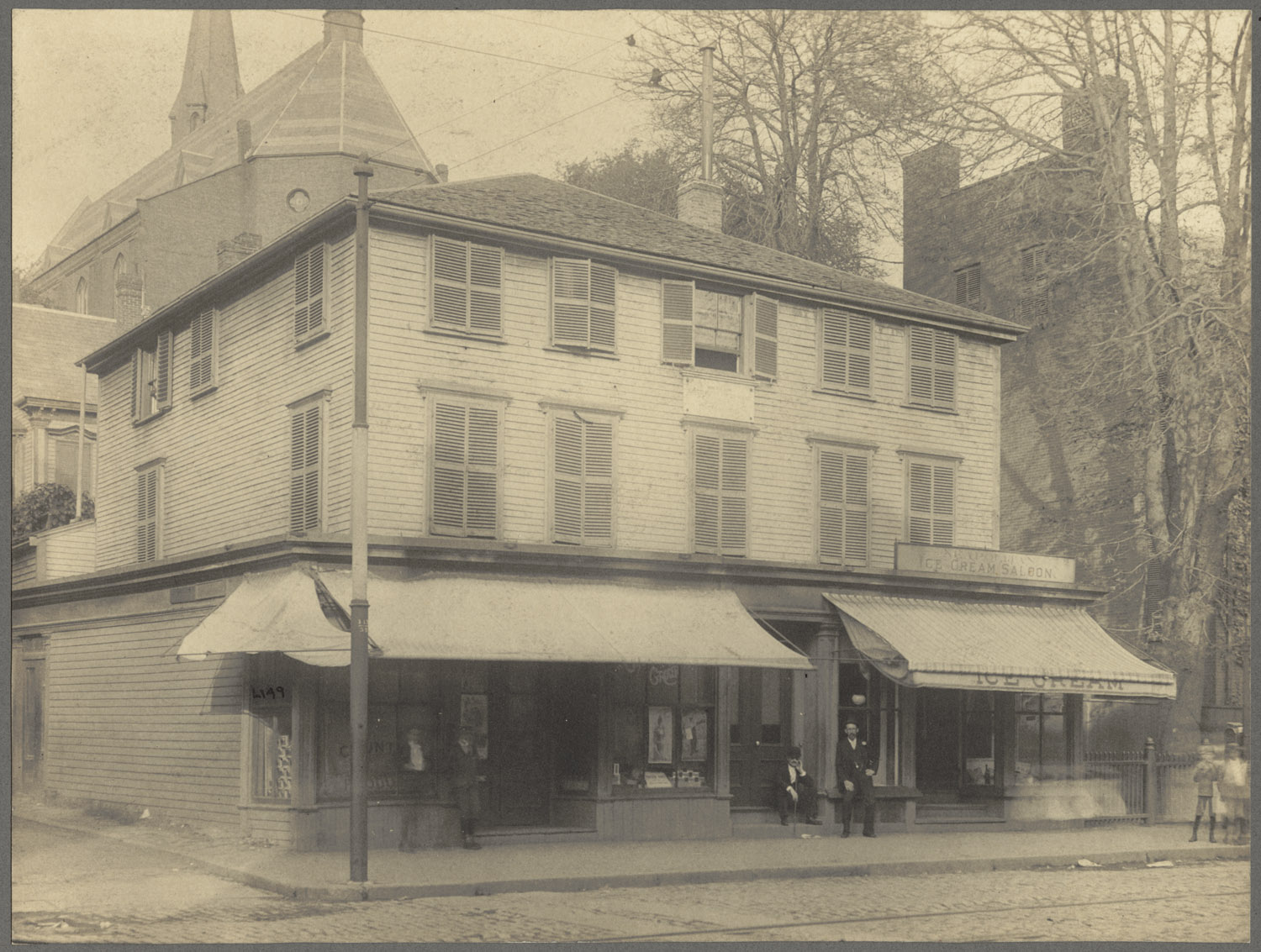
Birthplace of Morse, Charlestown, Massachusetts, c. 1898 photo

Samuel Finley Breese Morse was born on April 27, 1791, in Charlestown, a settlement near Boston, Massachusetts, the first child of Elizabeth Ann Finley (née Breese) and Jedidiah Morse, a Congregational minister and a geographer. His father was a great preacher of the Calvinist faith and supporter of the Federalist Party. He thought it helped preserve Puritan traditions (strict observance of Sabbath, among other things), and supported the Federalist policies of an American alliance with Britain and a strong federal government. Morse strongly believed in education within a Federalist framework, alongside the instillation of Calvinist virtues, morals, and prayers for his first son. His first ancestor in America was Anthony Morse, of Marlborough, Wiltshire, who had emigrated to America in 1635, and settled in Newbury, Massachusetts.

From 1799 to 1805, Morse attended Phillips Academy in Andover, Massachusetts, before entering Yale College in New Haven, Connecticut, at the age of fourteen. While at Yale, he attended lectures on electricity from Benjamin Silliman and Jeremiah Day, and earned money by painting portraits of fellow students and teachers. In 1810, he graduated from Yale and returned to Charlestown.

Morse married Lucretia Pickering Walker on September 29, 1818, in Concord, New Hampshire. She died on February 7, 1825, of a heart attack shortly after the birth of their third child. He married his second wife, Sarah Elizabeth Griswold on August 10, 1848, in Utica, New York and had four children.

== Painting ==
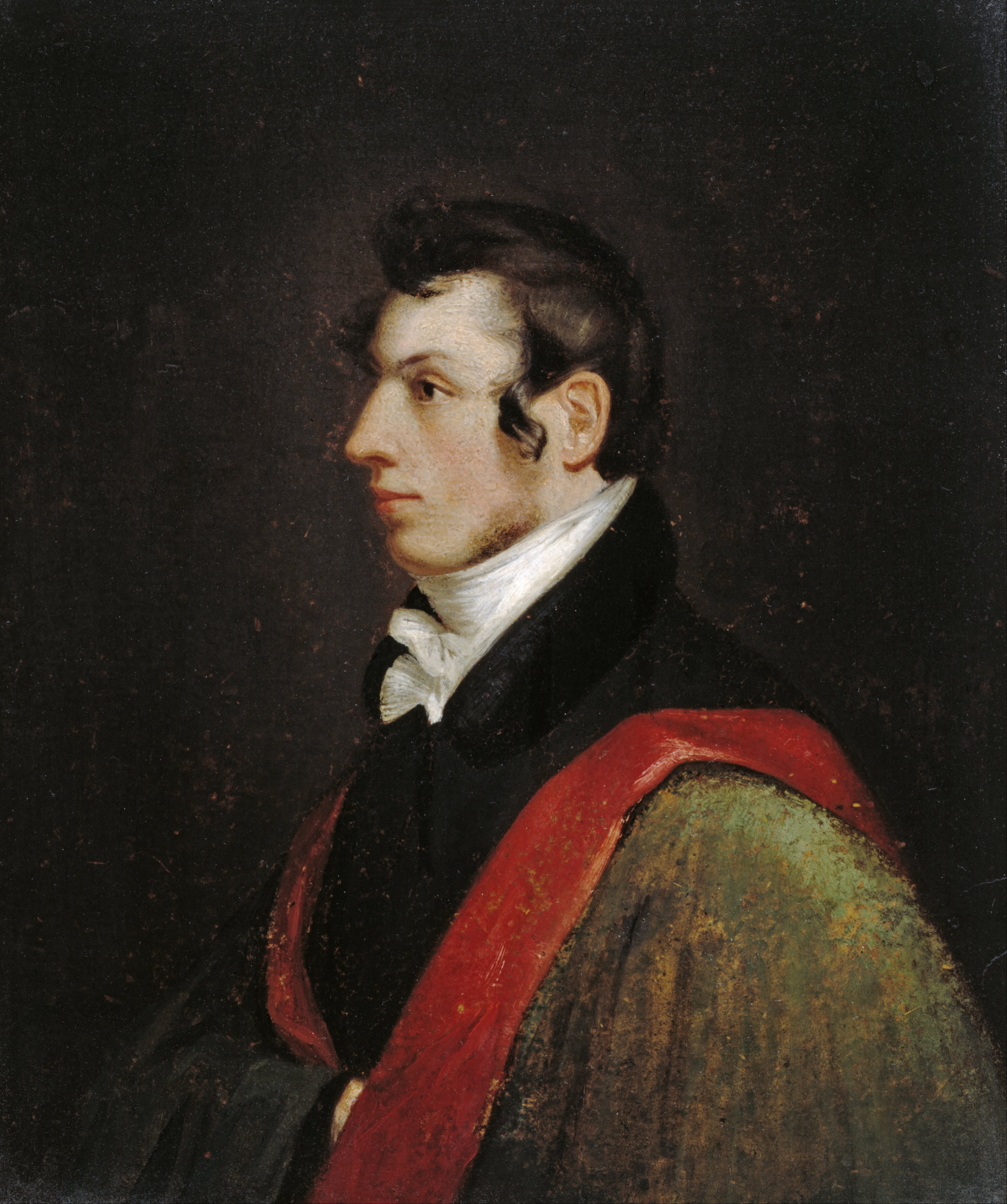
Self-portrait of Morse in 1812 (National Portrait Gallery)

Morse expressed some of his Calvinist beliefs in his painting, Landing of the Pilgrims, through the depiction of simple clothing as well as the people's austere facial features. His image captured the psychology of the Federalists; Calvinists from England brought to North America ideas of religion and government, thus linking the two countries. This work attracted the attention of the notable artist, Washington Allston. Allston wanted Morse to accompany him to England to meet the artist Benjamin West. Allston arranged—with Morse's father—a three-year stay for painting study in England. The two men set sail aboard the Libya on July 15, 1811.

In England, Morse perfected his painting techniques under Allston's watchful eye; by the end of 1811, he gained admittance to the Royal Academy. At the academy, he was moved by the art of the Renaissance and paid close attention to the works of Michelangelo and Raphael. After observing and practicing life drawing and absorbing its anatomical demands, the young artist produced his masterpiece, the Dying Hercules. (He first made a sculpture as a study for the painting.) During Morse's time in England, the British and Americans were engaged in the War of 1812, which the pro-British Federalists had consistently opposed. As the war raged on, Morse's letters to his parents became more anti-Federalist in tone. In one letter, Morse wrote:

I assert ... that the Federalists in the Northern States have done more injury to their country by their violent opposition measures than a French alliance could. Their proceedings are copied into the English papers, read before Parliament, and circulated through their country, and what do they say of them... they call them [Federalists] cowards, a base set, say they are traitors to their country and ought to be hanged like traitors.

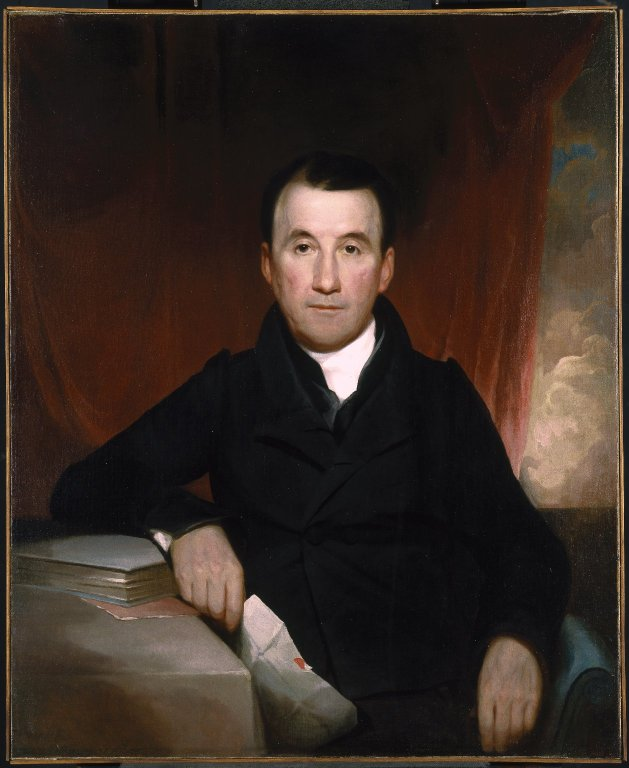
Jonas Platt, New York politician, by Morse. Oil on canvas, 1828, Brooklyn Museum.

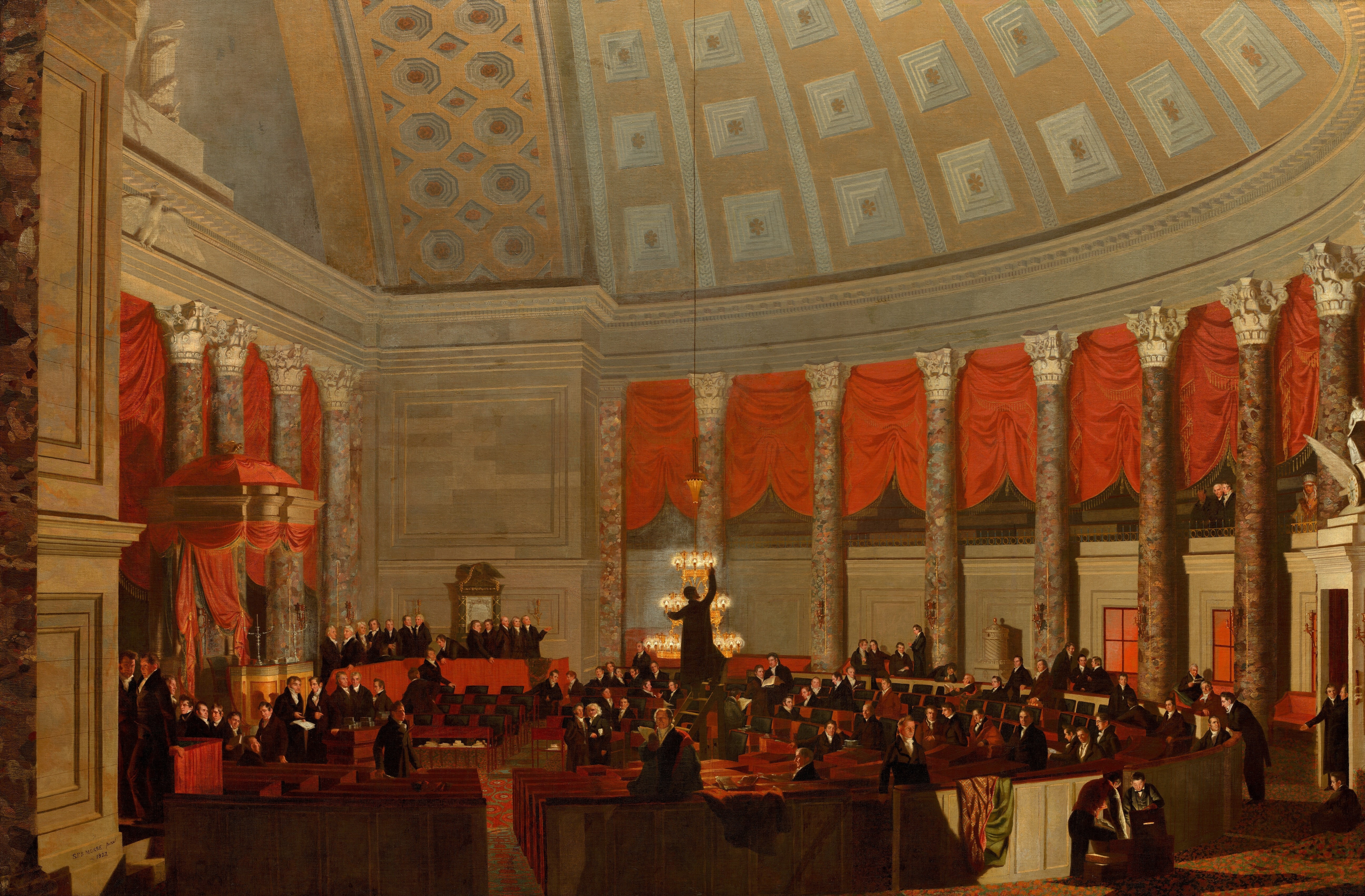
The House of Representatives. Oil on canvas, 1822, National Gallery of Art.

Although Jedidiah Morse did not change Samuel's political views, he continued as an influence. Critics believe that the elder Morse's Calvinist ideas are integral to Morse's Judgment of Jupiter, another significant work completed in England. Jupiter is shown in a cloud, accompanied by his eagle, with his hand spread above the parties and he is pronouncing judgment. Marpessa, with an expression of compunction and shame, is throwing herself into the arms of her husband. Idas, who tenderly loved Marpessa, is eagerly rushing forward to receive her while Apollo stares with surprise.

Critics have suggested that Jupiter represents God's omnipotence—watching every move that is made. Some call the portrait a moral teaching by Morse on infidelity. Although Marpessa fell victim, she realized that her eternal salvation was important and desisted from her wicked ways. Apollo shows no remorse for what he did but stands with a puzzled look. Many American paintings throughout the early nineteenth century had religious themes, and Morse was an early exemplar of this. Judgment of Jupiter allowed Morse to express his support of Anti-Federalism while maintaining his strong spiritual convictions. Benjamin West sought to present the Jupiter at another Royal Academy exhibition, but Morse's time had run out. He left England on August 21, 1815, to return to the United States and begin his full-time career as a painter. The decade 1815–1825 marked significant growth in Morse's work, as he sought to capture the essence of America's culture and life. He painted the Federalist former President John Adams (1816). The Federalists and Anti-Federalists clashed over Dartmouth College. Morse painted portraits of Francis Brown—the college's president—and Judge Woodward (1817), who was involved in bringing the Dartmouth case before the U.S. Supreme Court.

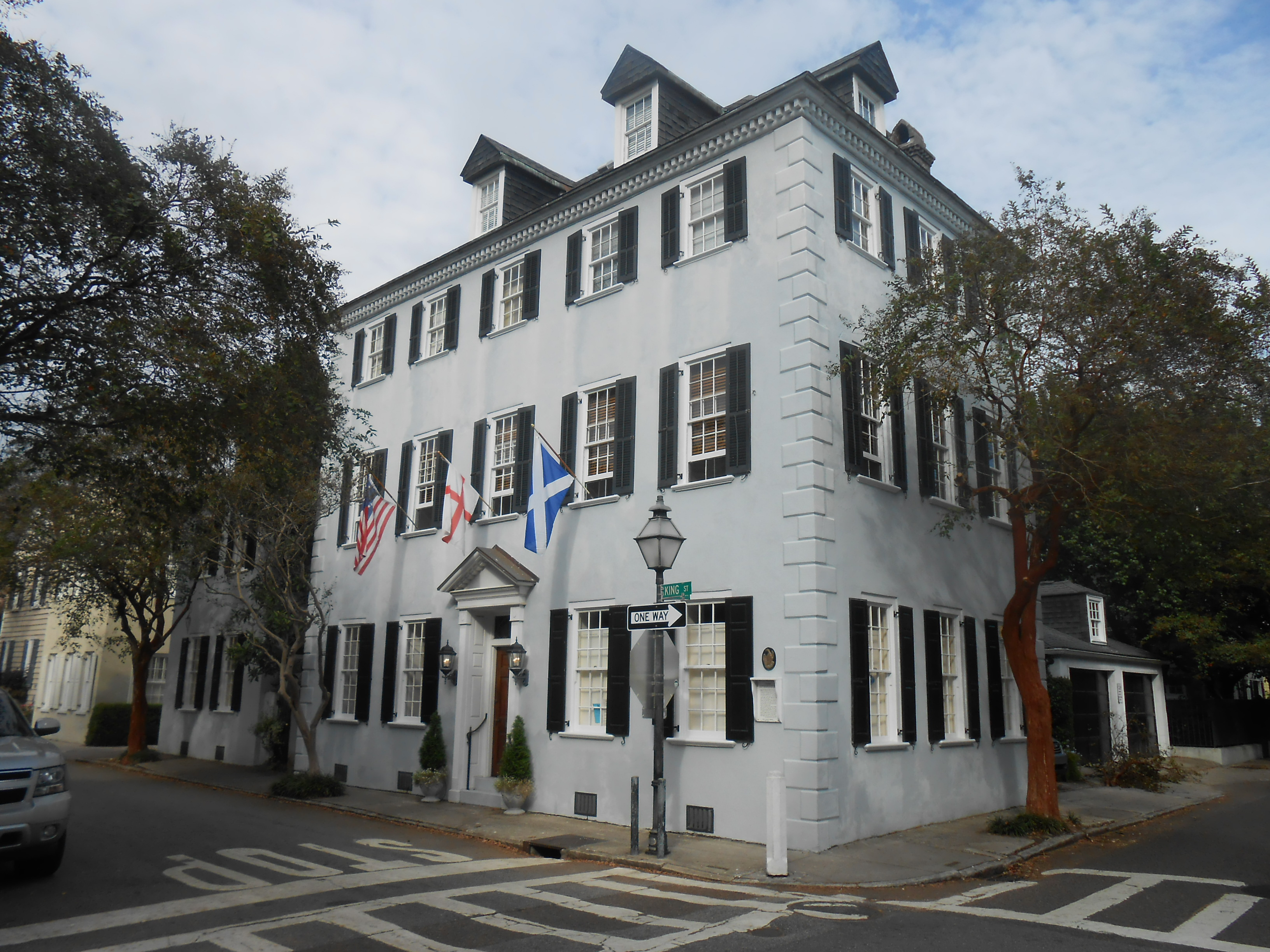
Morse maintained a studio at 94 Tradd St., Charleston, South Carolina, for a short period.

Morse also sought commissions among the elite of Charleston, South Carolina. Morse's 1818 painting of Mrs. Emma Quash symbolized the opulence of Charleston. The young artist was doing well for himself. Between 1819 and 1821, Morse went through great changes in his life, including a decline in commissions due to the Panic of 1819. Morse was commissioned to paint President James Monroe in 1820. He embodied Jeffersonian democracy by favoring the common man over the aristocrat. Morse had moved to New Haven. His commissions for The House of Representatives (1821) and a portrait of the Marquis de Lafayette (1825) engaged his sense of democratic nationalism. The House of Representatives was designed to capitalize on the success of François Marius Granet's The Capuchin Chapel in Rome, which toured the United States extensively throughout the 1820s, attracting audiences willing to pay the 25-cent admission fee.

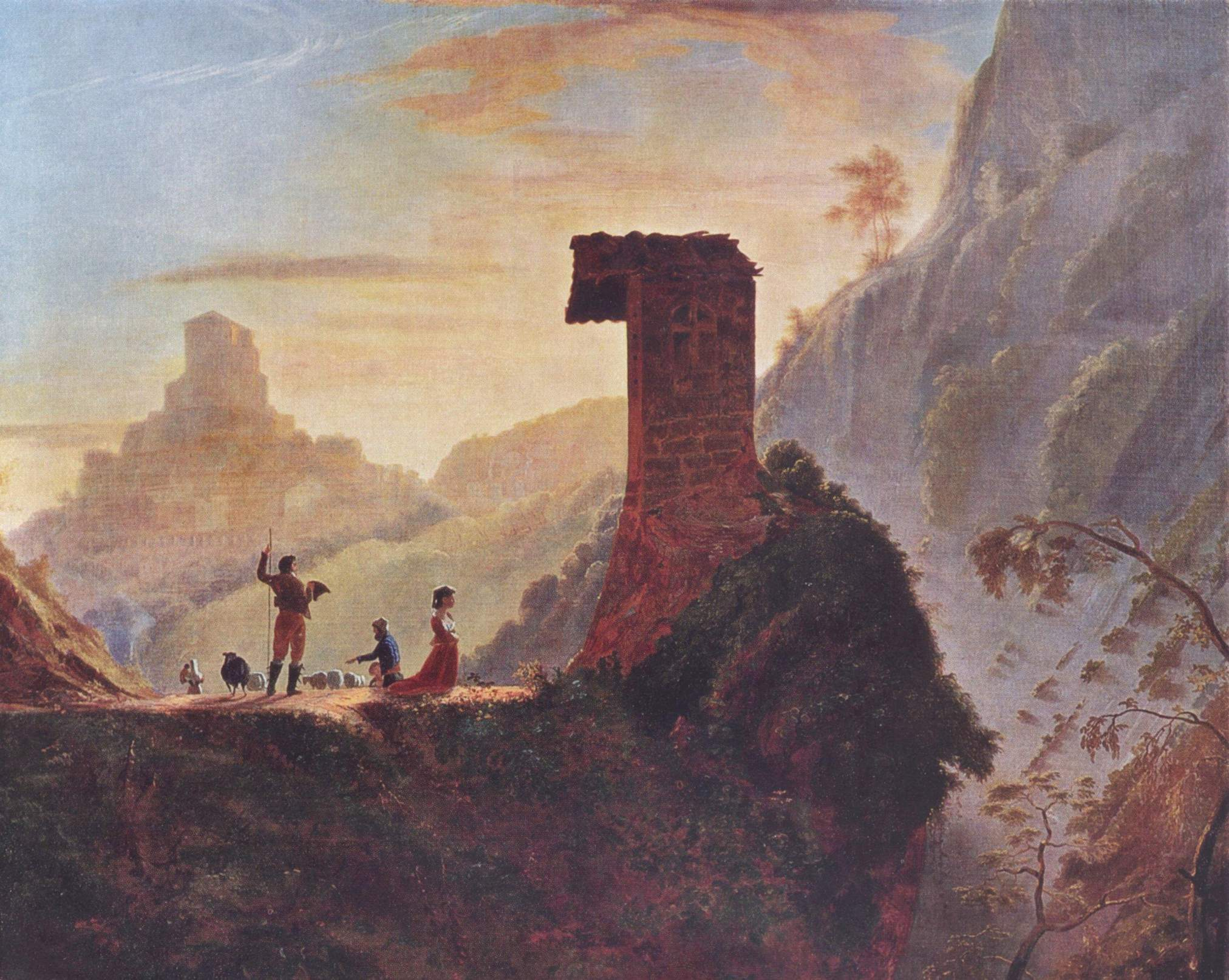
The Chapel of the Virgin at Subiaco, 1830

The artist chose to paint the House of Representatives, in a similar way, with careful attention to architecture and dramatic lighting. He also wished to select a uniquely American topic that would bring glory to the young nation. His subject did just that, showing American democracy in action. He traveled to Washington D.C. to draw the architecture of the new Capitol and placed eighty individuals within the painting. He chose to portray a night scene, balancing the architecture of the Rotunda with the figures, and using lamplight to highlight the work. Pairs of people, those who stood alone, individuals bent over their desks working, were each painted simply but with faces of character. Morse chose nighttime to convey that Congress' dedication to the principles of democracy transcended day.

The House of Representatives failed to draw a crowd when exhibited in New York City in 1823. By contrast, John Trumbull's Declaration of Independence had won popular acclaim a few years earlier. Viewers may have felt that the architecture of The House of Representatives overshadows the individuals, making it hard to appreciate the drama of what was happening. Morse was honored to paint the Marquis de Lafayette, the leading French supporter of the American Revolution. He felt compelled to paint a grand portrait of the man who helped to establish a free and independent America. He features Lafayette against a magnificent sunset. He has positioned Lafayette to the right of three pedestals: one has a bust of Benjamin Franklin, another of George Washington, and the third seems reserved for Lafayette. A peaceful woodland landscape below him symbolized American tranquility and prosperity as it approached the age of fifty. The developing friendship between Morse and Lafayette and their discussions of the Revolutionary War affected the artist after his return to New York City.

In 1826, he helped found the National Academy of Design in New York City. He served as the academy's president from 1826 to 1845 and again from 1861 to 1862. Forty-nine of his paintings were exhibited there. From 1830 to 1832, Morse traveled and studied in Europe to improve his painting skills, visiting Italy, Switzerland, and France. During his time in Paris, he developed a friendship with the writer James Fenimore Cooper. As a project, he painted miniature copies of 38 of the Louvre's famous paintings on a single canvas (6 ft. x 9 ft), which he entitled The Gallery of the Louvre. He completed the work upon his return to the United States.

In 1832, after his return to the United States, Morse was appointed professor of painting and sculpture at the University of the City of New York, now New York University. This was the first such professorship in the United States. On a subsequent visit to Paris in 1839, Morse met Louis Daguerre. He became interested in the latter's daguerreotype—the first practical means of photography. Morse wrote a letter to the New York Observer describing the invention, which was published widely in the American press and provided broad awareness of the new technology. Mathew Brady, one of the earliest photographers in American history, famous for his depictions of the Civil War, initially studied under Morse and later took photographs of him.

Some of Morse's paintings and sculptures are on display at his Locust Grove estate in Poughkeepsie, New York.

Morse artworks

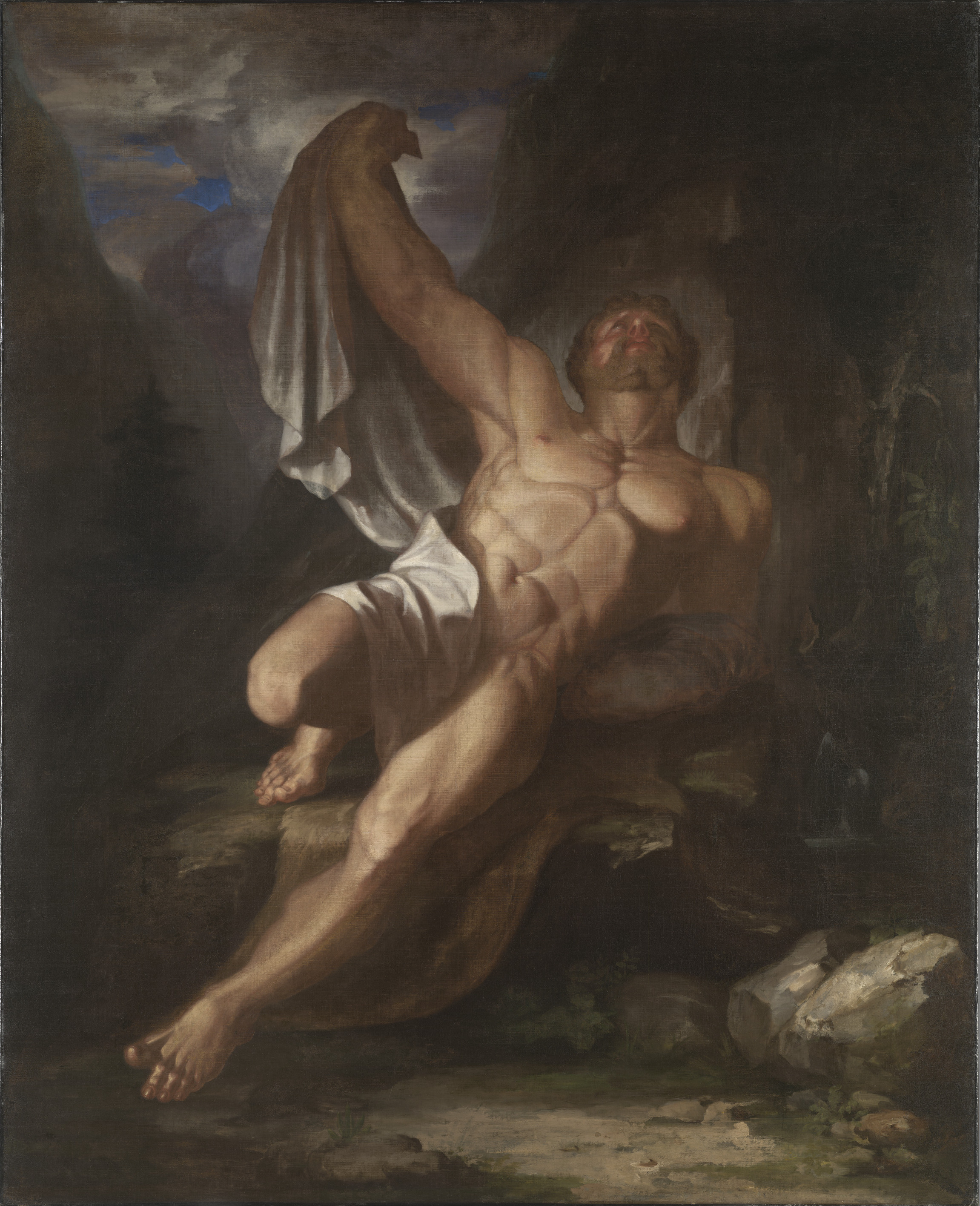
Dying Hercules, Morse's early masterpiece

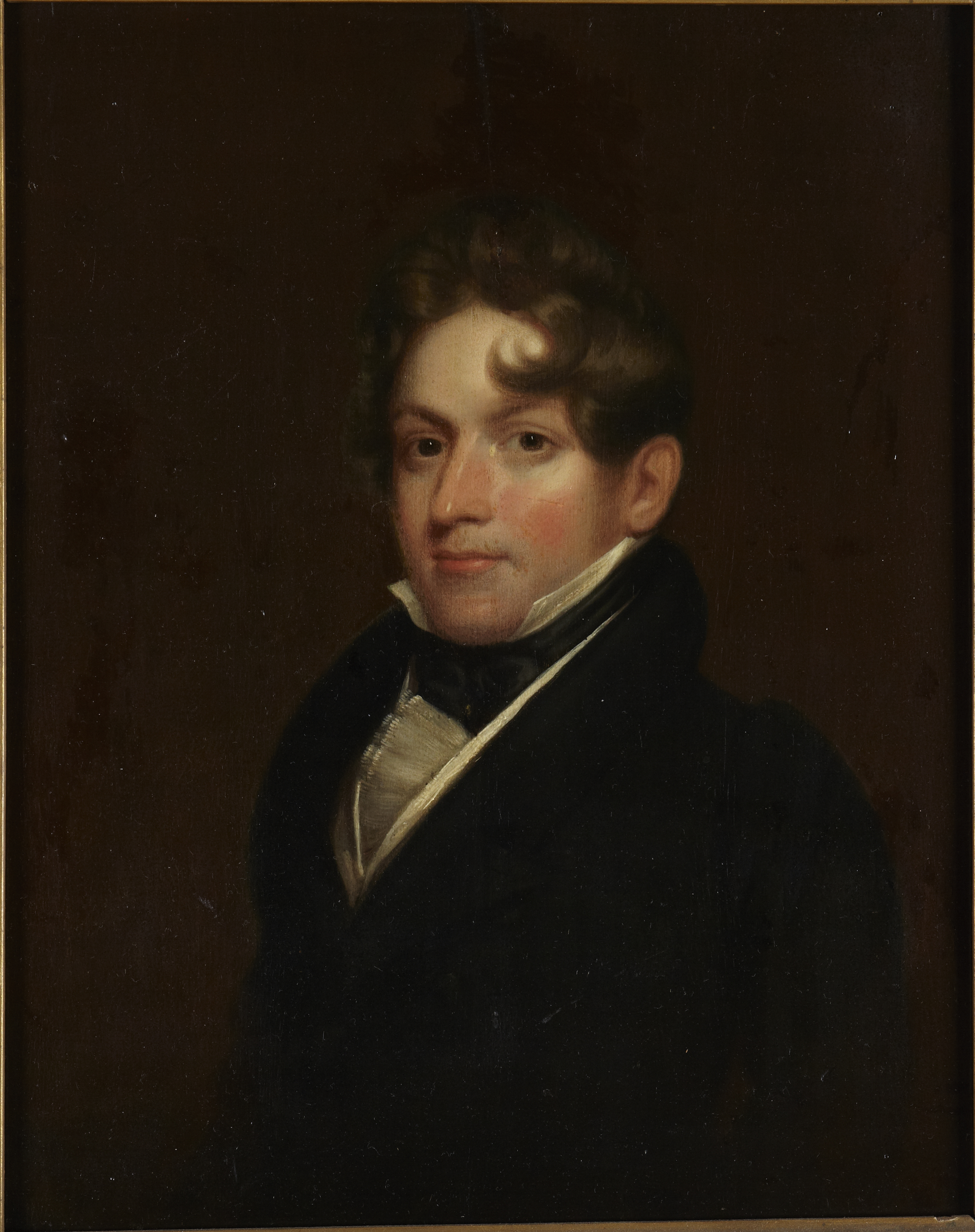
Captain Demaresque of Gloucester, Massachusetts, Princeton University Art Museum

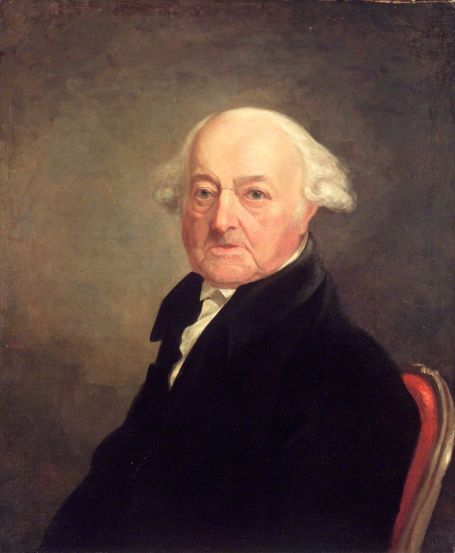
Portrait of John Adams

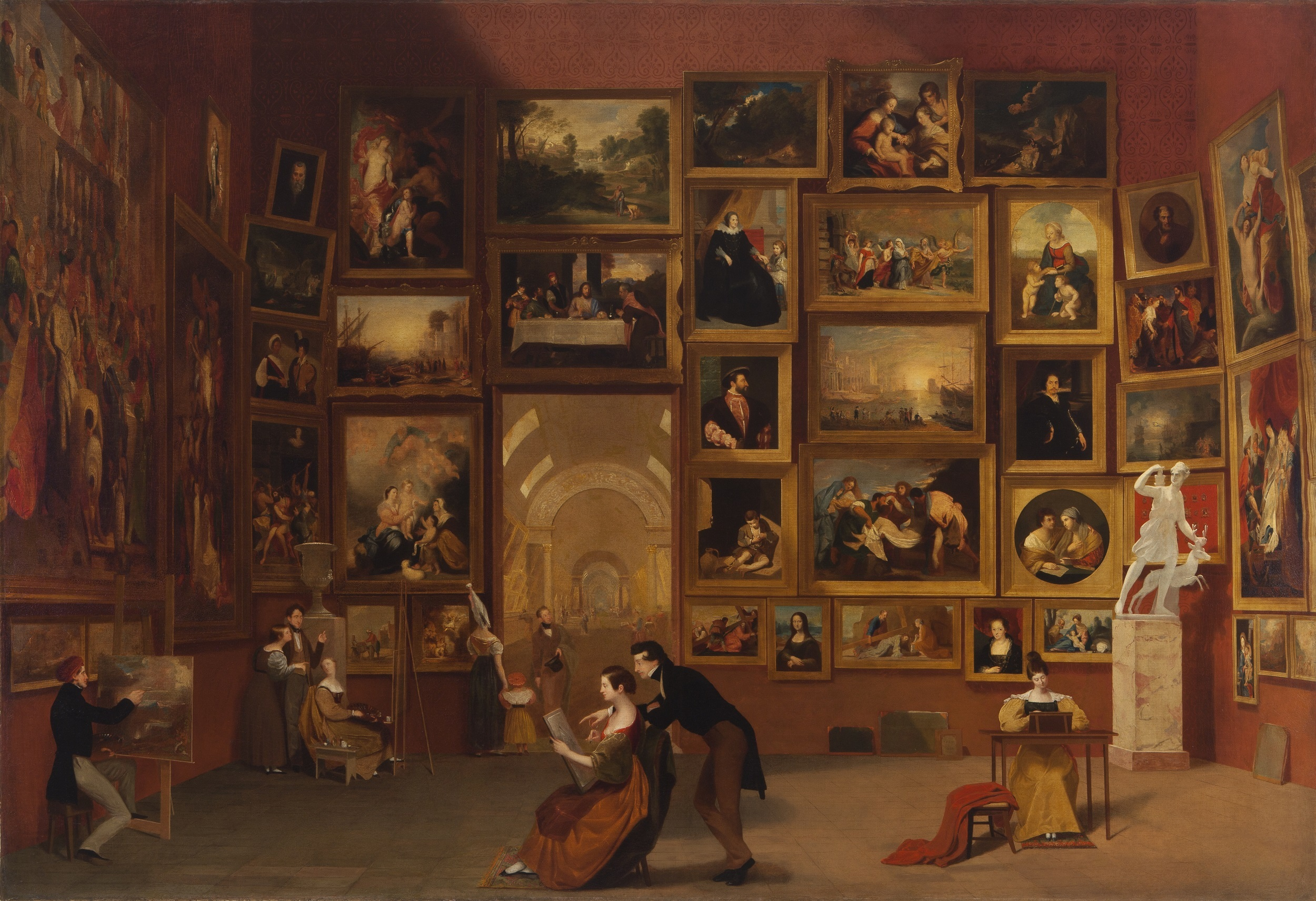
Gallery of the Louvre 1831–33

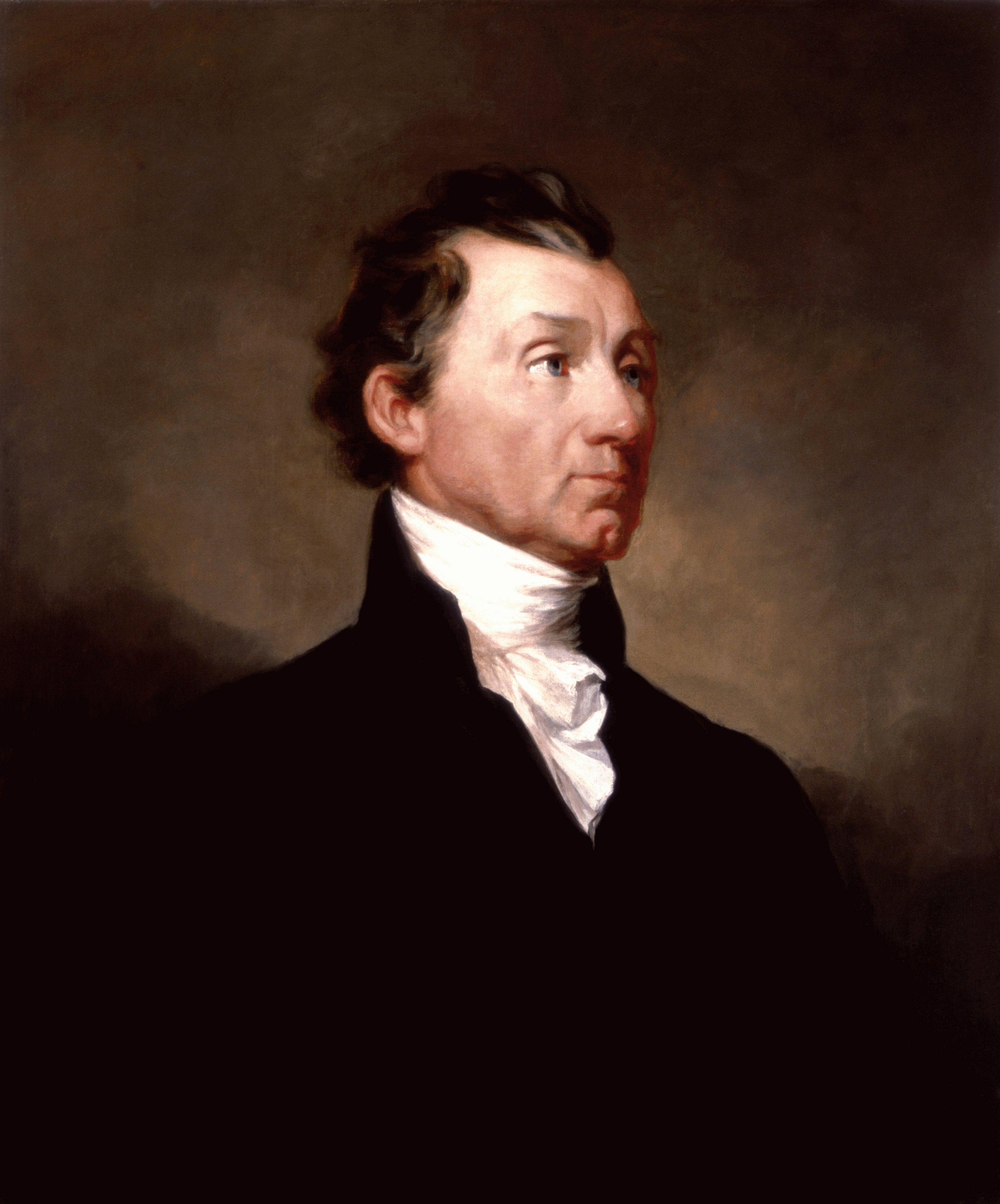
Portrait of James Monroe, 5th President of the United States c. 1819

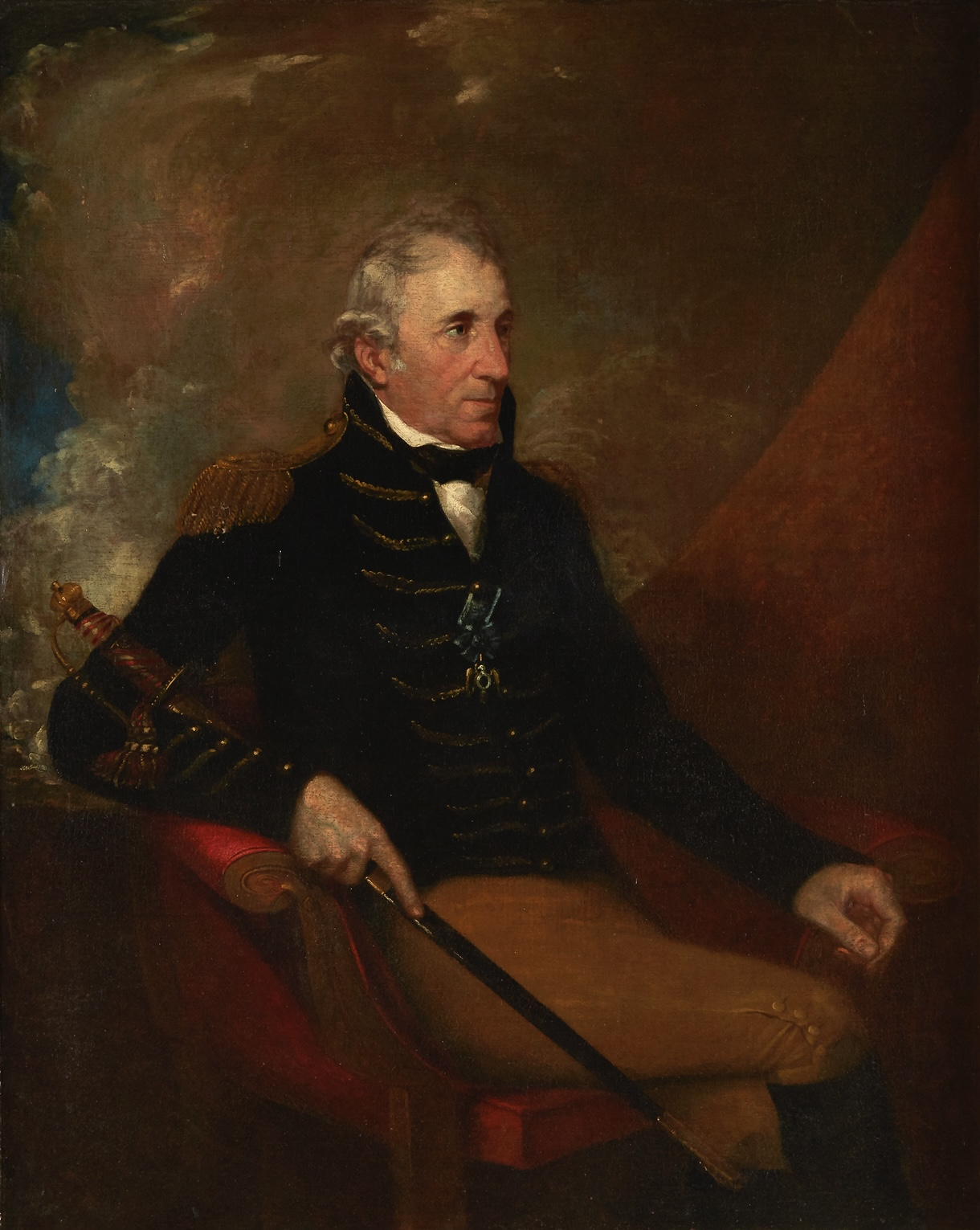
Portrait of Thomas Pinckney, c. 1820

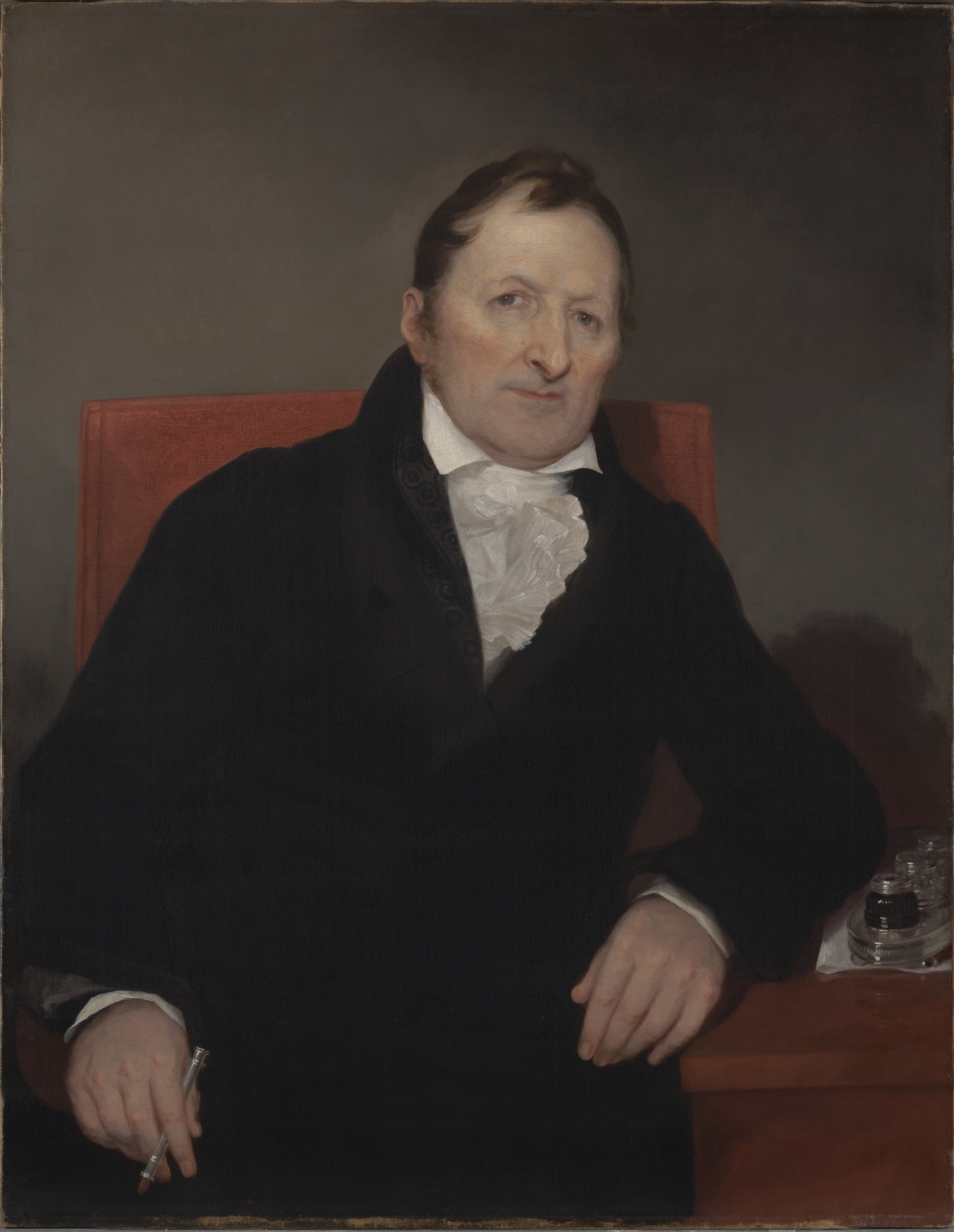
Eli Whitney, inventor, 1822. Yale University Art Gallery

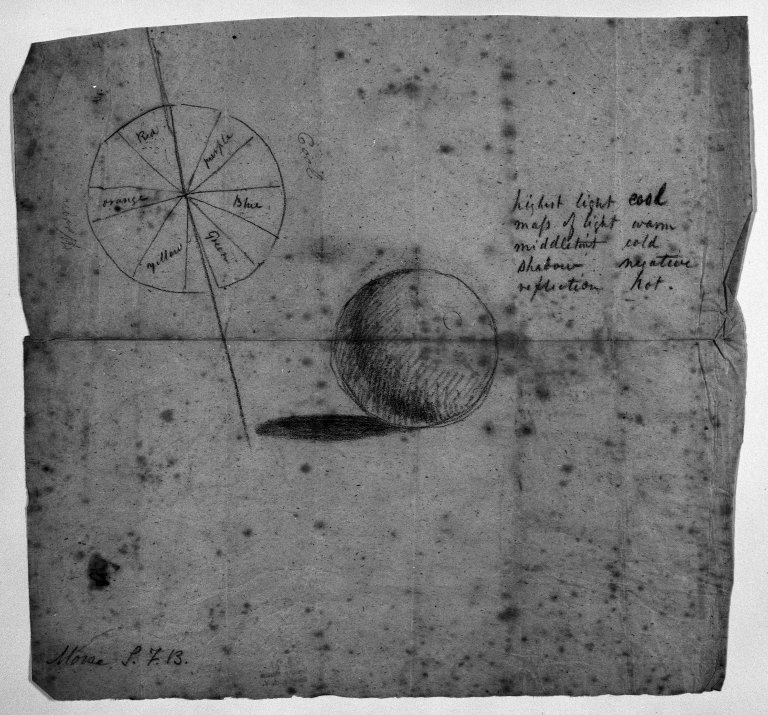
Chart of Colors, drawn to illustrate his palette of colors

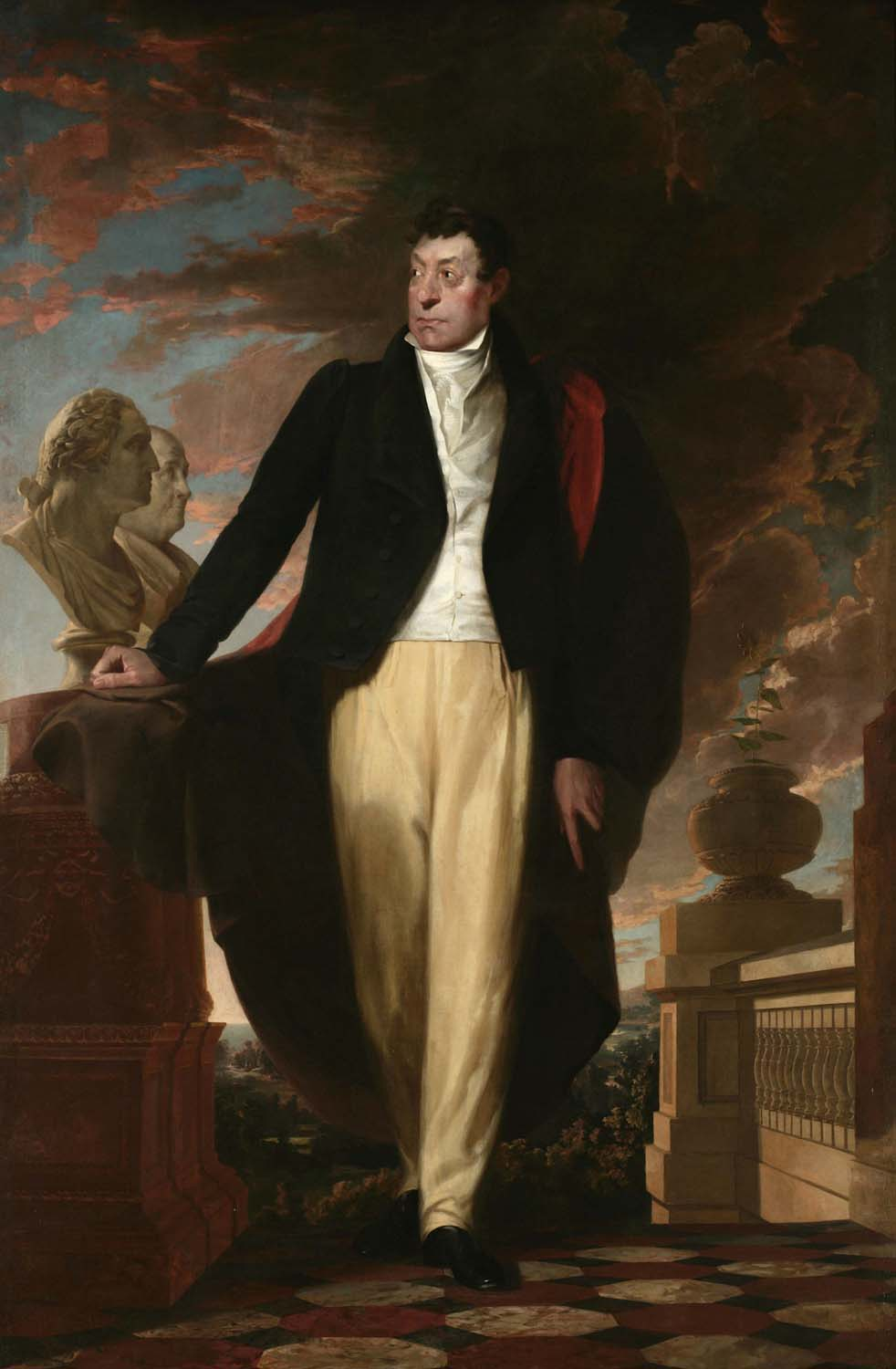
Portrait of the Marquis de Lafayette, 1826

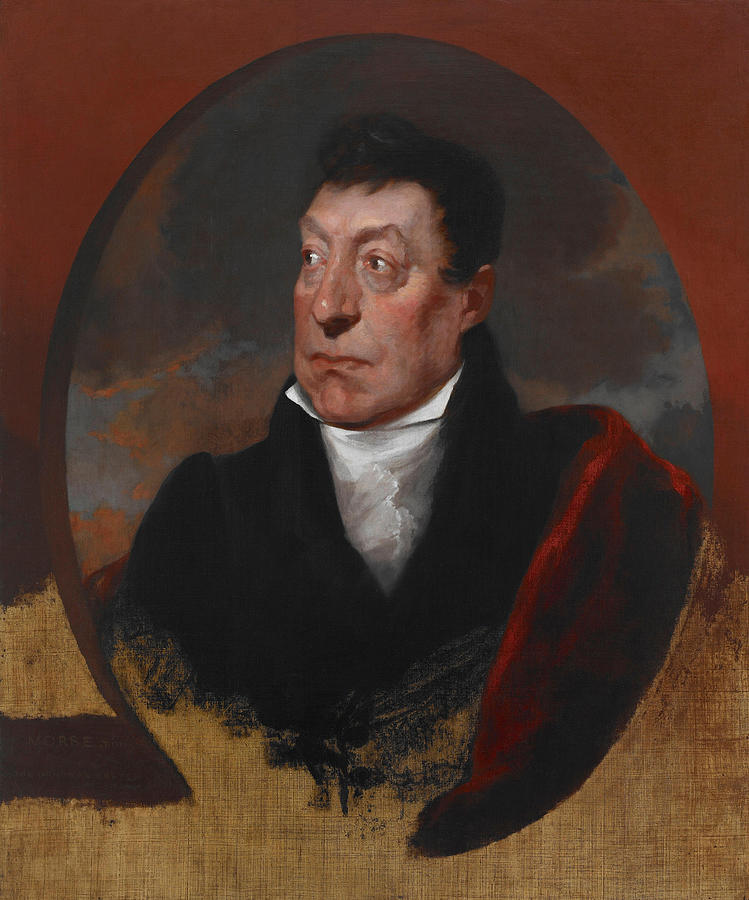
Portrait of Lafayette

== Attributed artworks ==
Year	Title	Image	Collection	Comments
1820	Latham Avery (c. 1820), oil on canvas (attributed to Samuel F. B. Morse)	view		Subject: lived 1775–1845; husband of Betsey Wood Lester (m. 1816). IAP 8E110005
1820	Mrs. Latham Avery (c. 1820), oil on canvas (attributed to Samuel F. B. Morse)			Subject: Betsey Wood Lester (1787–1837). IAP 8E110006

== Telegraph ==
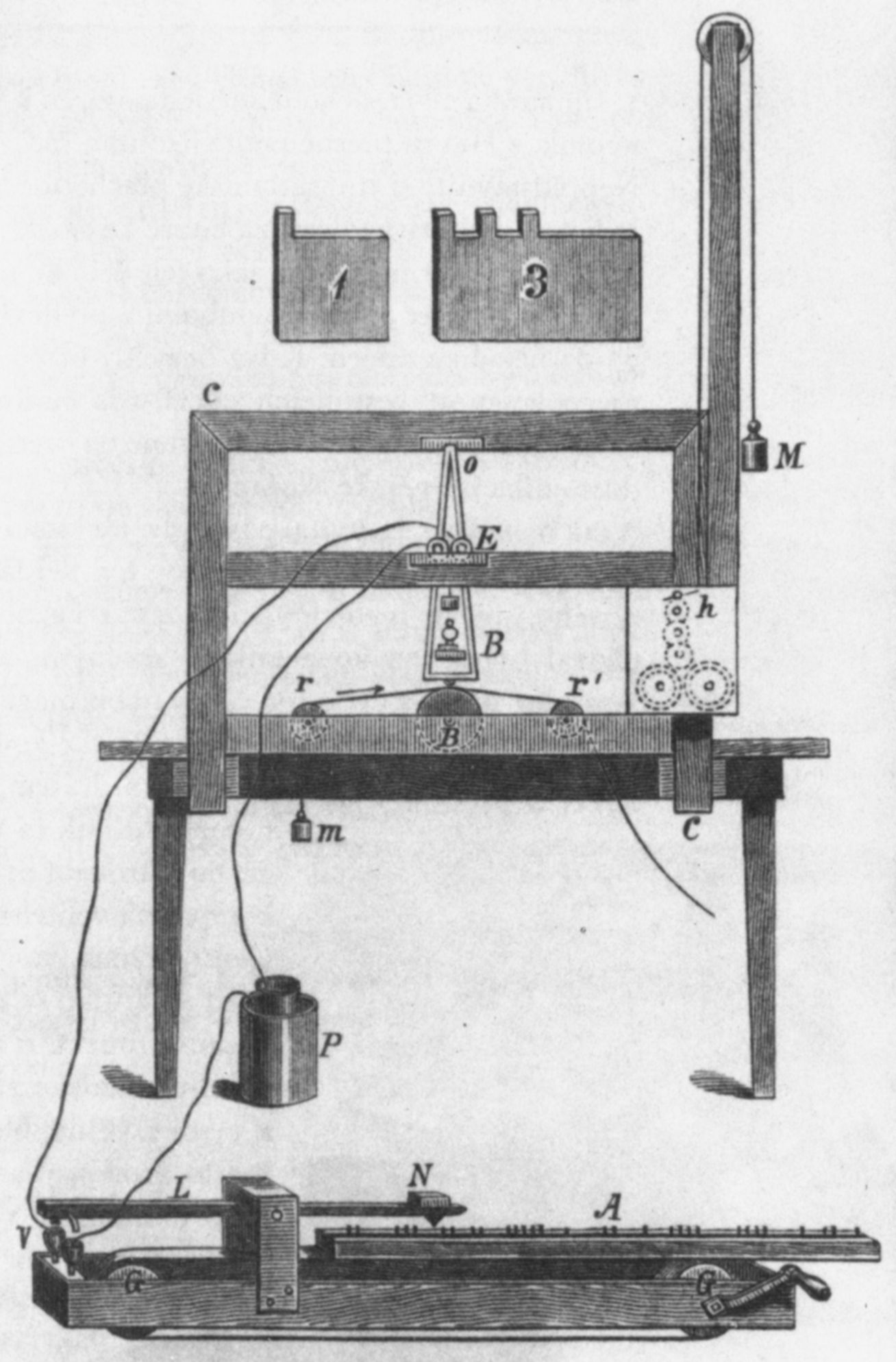
Original Samuel Morse telegraph

While returning by ship from Europe in 1832, Morse encountered Charles Thomas Jackson of Boston, a man who was well schooled in electromagnetism. Witnessing various experiments with Jackson's electromagnet, Morse developed the concept of a single-wire telegraph. He set aside the painting he had been working on, The Gallery of the Louvre. The original Morse telegraph, submitted with his patent application, is part of the collections of the National Museum of American History at the Smithsonian Institution. In time, the Morse code that he developed would become the primary language of telegraphy in the world. It is still the standard for rhythmic transmission of data.

Meanwhile, William Cooke and Professor Charles Wheatstone had learned of the Wilhelm Weber and Carl Gauss electromagnetic telegraph in 1833. They had reached the stage of launching a commercial telegraph prior to Morse, despite starting later. In England, Cooke became fascinated by electrical telegraphy in 1836, four years after Morse. Aided by his greater financial resources, Cooke abandoned his primary subject of anatomy and built a small electrical telegraph within three weeks. Wheatstone also was experimenting with telegraphy and (most importantly) understood that a single large battery would not carry a telegraphic signal over long distances. He theorized that numerous small batteries were far more successful and efficient in this task. (Wheatstone was building on the primary research of Joseph Henry, an American physicist.) Cooke and Wheatstone formed a partnership and patented the electrical telegraph in May 1837, and within a short time had provided the Great Western Railway with a 13-mile (21 km) stretch of telegraph. However, within a few years, Cooke and Wheatstone's multiple-wire signaling method would be overtaken by Morse's cheaper method.

In an 1848 letter to a friend, Morse describes how vigorously he fought to be called the sole inventor of the electromagnetic telegraph despite the previous inventions.

I have been so constantly under the necessity of watching the movements of the most unprincipled set of pirates I have ever known, that all my time has been occupied in defense, in putting evidence into something like legal shape that I am the inventor of the Electro-Magnetic Telegraph! Would you have believed it ten years ago that a question could be raised on that subject?

— S. Morse.

== Relays ==
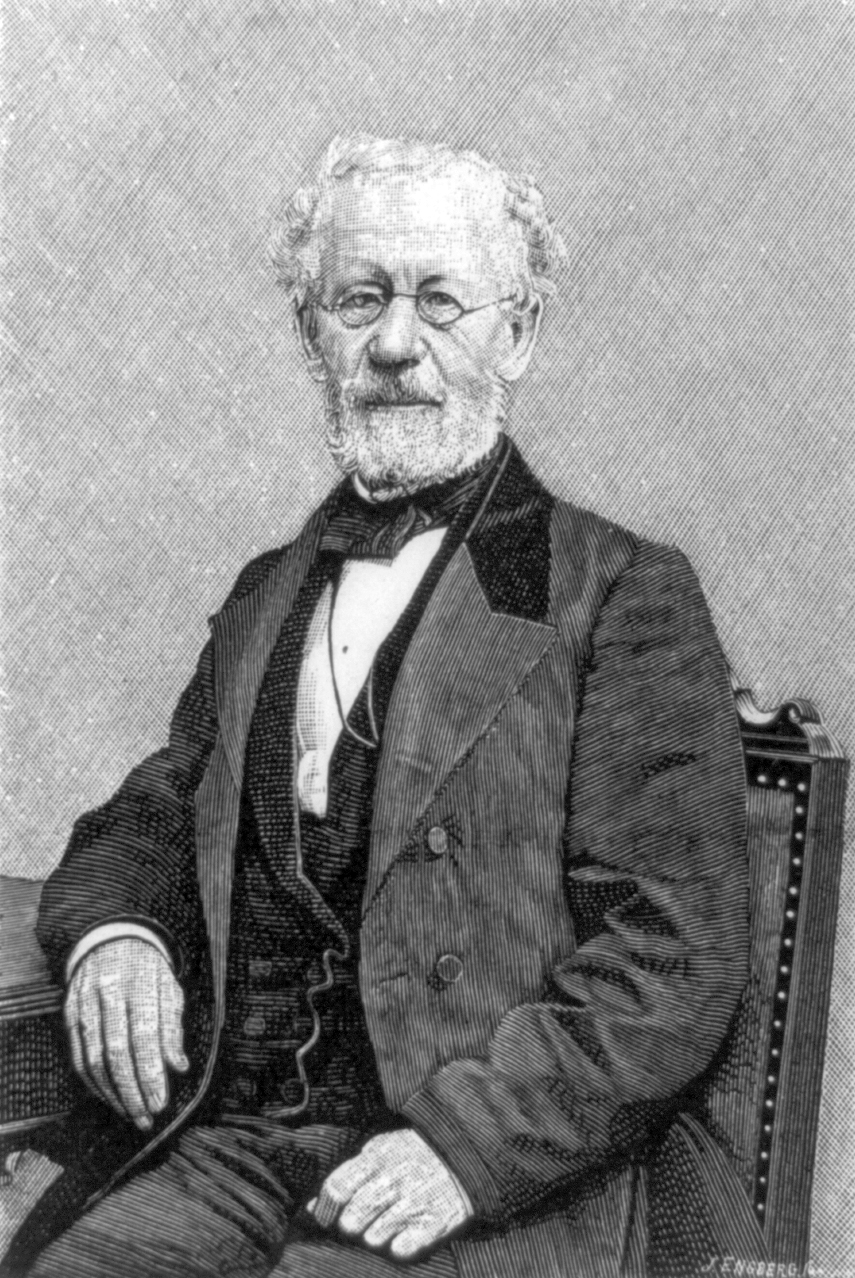
Leonard Gale, who helped Morse achieve the technological breakthrough of getting the telegraphic signal to travel long distances over wire

Morse encountered the problem of getting a telegraphic signal to carry over more than a few hundred yards of wire. His breakthrough came from the insights of Leonard Gale, who taught chemistry at New York University (he was a personal friend of Joseph Henry). With Gale's help, Morse introduced extra circuits or relays at frequent intervals and was soon able to send a message through ten miles (16 km) of wire. This was the great breakthrough he had been seeking. Morse and Gale were soon joined by Alfred Vail, an enthusiastic young man with excellent skills, insights, and money.

At the Speedwell Ironworks in Morristown, New Jersey on January 11, 1838, Morse and Vail made the first public demonstration of the electric telegraph. Although Morse and Alfred Vail had done most of the research and development in the ironworks facilities, they chose a nearby factory house as the demonstration site. Without the repeater, Morse devised a system of electromagnetic relays. This was the key innovation, as it freed the technology from being limited by distance in sending messages. The range of the telegraph was limited to two miles (3.2 km), and the inventors had pulled two miles (3.2 km) of wires inside the factory house through an elaborate scheme. The first public transmission, with the message, "A patient waiter is no loser", was witnessed by a mostly local crowd.

Morse traveled to Washington, D.C. in 1838 seeking federal sponsorship for a telegraph line but was not successful. He went to Europe, seeking both sponsorship and patents, but in London discovered that Cooke and Wheatstone had already established priority. After his return to the US, Morse finally gained financial backing by Maine congressman Francis Ormand Jonathan Smith. This funding may be the first instance of government support to a private researcher, especially funding for applied (as opposed to basic or theoretical) research.

== Federal support ==
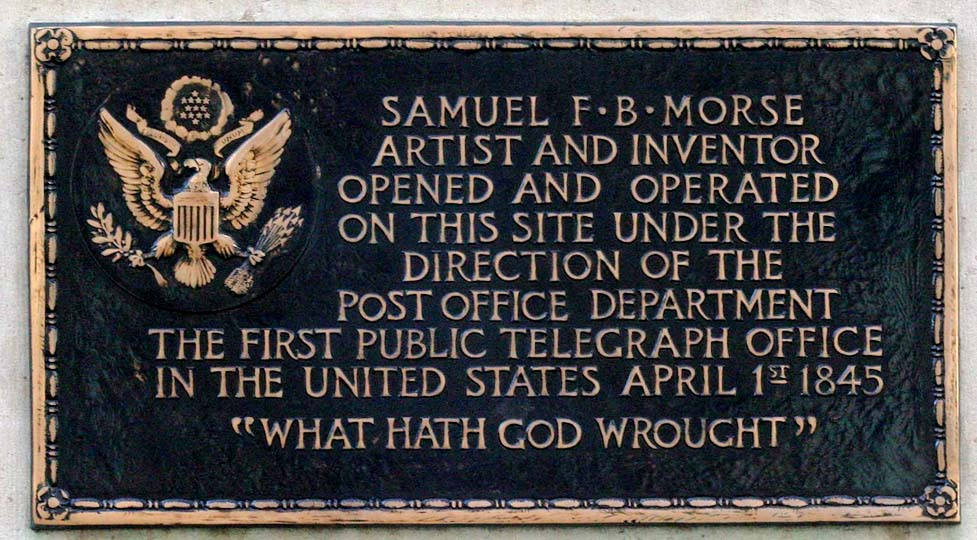
Plaque at the first telegraph office

Morse made his last trip to Washington, D.C., in December 1842, stringing "wires between two committee rooms in the Capitol, and sent messages back and forth" to demonstrate his telegraph system. Congress appropriated $30,000 (equivalent to $1,037,000 in 2025) in 1843 for construction of an experimental 38-mile (61 km) telegraph line between Washington, D.C., and Baltimore along the right-of-way of the Baltimore and Ohio Railroad. An impressive demonstration occurred on May 1, 1844, when news of the Whig Party's nomination of Henry Clay for U.S. president was telegraphed from the party's convention in Baltimore to the Capitol Building in Washington.

On May 24, 1844, the line was officially opened as Morse sent the now-famous words, "What hath God wrought," from the Supreme Court chamber in the basement of the U.S. Capitol building in Washington, D.C., to the B&O's Mount Clare Station in Baltimore. Annie Ellsworth chose these words from the Bible (Numbers 23:23); her father, U.S. Patent Commissioner Henry Leavitt Ellsworth, had championed Morse's invention and secured early funding for it. His telegraph could transmit thirty characters per minute.

In May 1845, the Magnetic Telegraph Company was formed in order to build telegraph lines from New York City toward Philadelphia, Boston, Buffalo, and the Mississippi. Telegraphic lines rapidly spread throughout the United States in the next few years, with 12,000 miles of wire laid by 1850.

Morse at one time adopted Wheatstone and Carl August von Steinheil's idea of broadcasting an electrical telegraph signal through a body of water or down steel railroad tracks or anything conductive. He went to great lengths to win a lawsuit for the right to be called "inventor of the telegraph" and promoted himself as being an inventor. But Alfred Vail also played an important role in the development of the Morse code, which was based on earlier codes for the electromagnetic telegraph.

== Patent ==
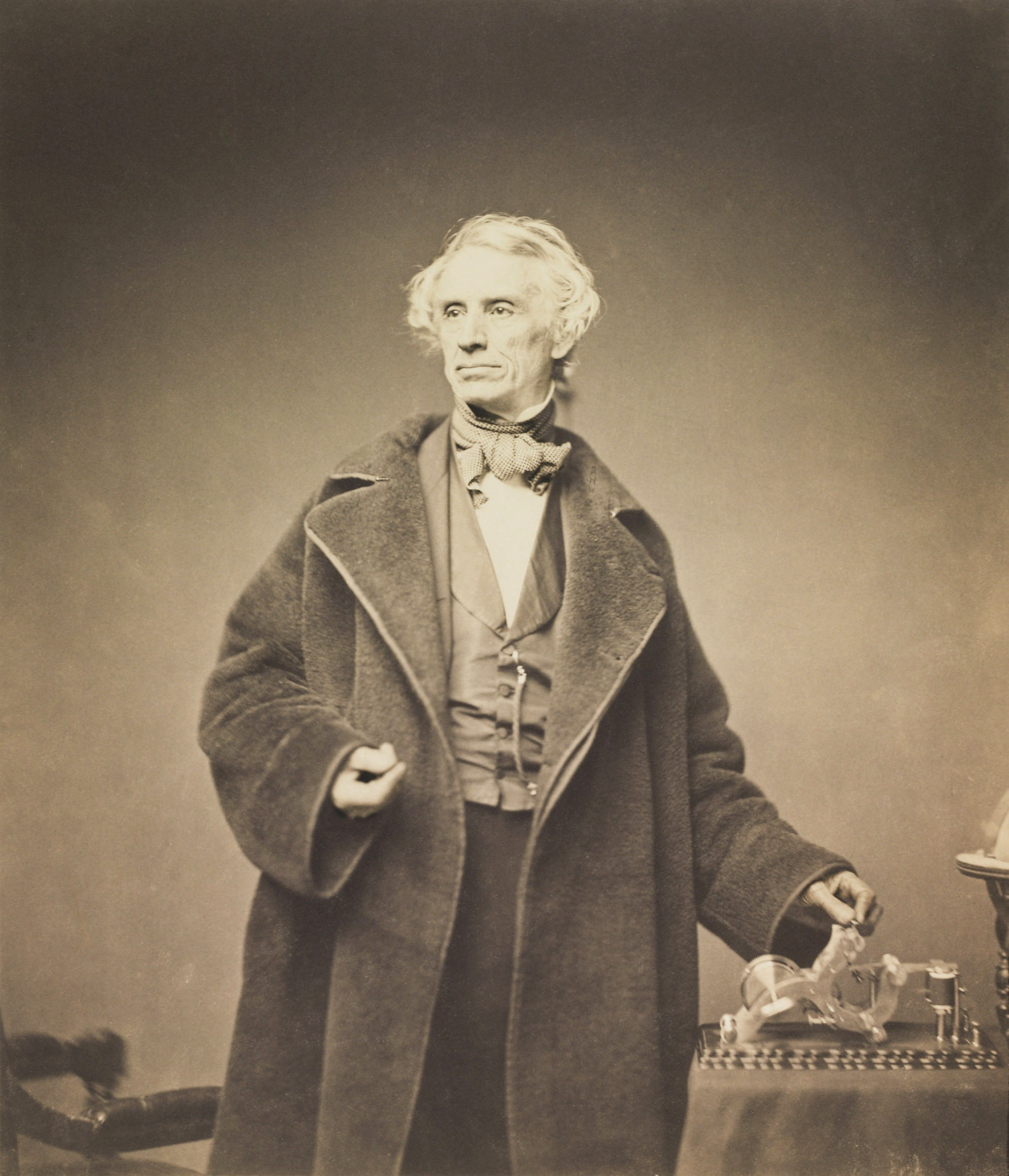
Morse with his recorder. Photograph taken by Mathew Brady in 1857.

Morse received a patent for the telegraph in 1847, at the old Beylerbeyi Palace (the present Beylerbeyi Palace was built in 1861–1865 on the same location) in Istanbul, which was issued by Sultan Abdülmecid, who personally tested the new invention. He was elected an Associate Fellow of the American Academy of Arts and Sciences in 1849. The original patent went to the Breese side of the family after the death of Samuel Morse.

In 1856, Morse went to Copenhagen and visited the Thorvaldsens Museum, where the sculptor's grave is in the inner courtyard. He was received by King Frederick VII, who decorated him with the Order of the Dannebrog for the telegraph. Morse expressed his wish to donate his Thorvaldsen portrait from 1831 in Rome to the king. The Thorvaldsen portrait today belongs to Margrethe II, the abdicated Queen of Denmark.

The Morse telegraphic apparatus was officially adopted as the standard for European telegraphy in 1851. Only the United Kingdom (with its extensive overseas empire) kept the needle telegraph of Cooke and Wheatstone. (Note: "It was in the month of J, a century ago, that Franklin made his celebrated experiment with the Electric Kite, by means of which he demonstrated the identity of electricity and lightning".)

In 1858, Morse introduced wired communication to Latin America when he established a telegraph system in Puerto Rico, then a Spanish Colony. Morse's oldest daughter, Susan Walker Morse (1819–1885), would often visit her uncle Charles Pickering Walker, who owned the Hacienda Concordia in the town of Guayama. During one of her visits, she met Edward Lind, a Danish merchant who worked in his brother-in-law's Hacienda La Henriqueta in the town of Arroyo. They later married. Lind purchased the Hacienda from his sister when she became a widow. Morse, who often spent his winters at the Hacienda with his daughter and son-in-law, set a two-mile telegraph line connecting his son-in-law's Hacienda to their house in Arroyo. The line was inaugurated on March 1, 1859, in a ceremony flanked by the Spanish and American flags. The first words transmitted by Samuel Morse that day in Puerto Rico were:

Puerto Rico, beautiful jewel! When you are linked with the other jewels of the Antilles in the necklace of the world's telegraph, yours will not shine less brilliantly in the crown of your Queen!

== Political views ==
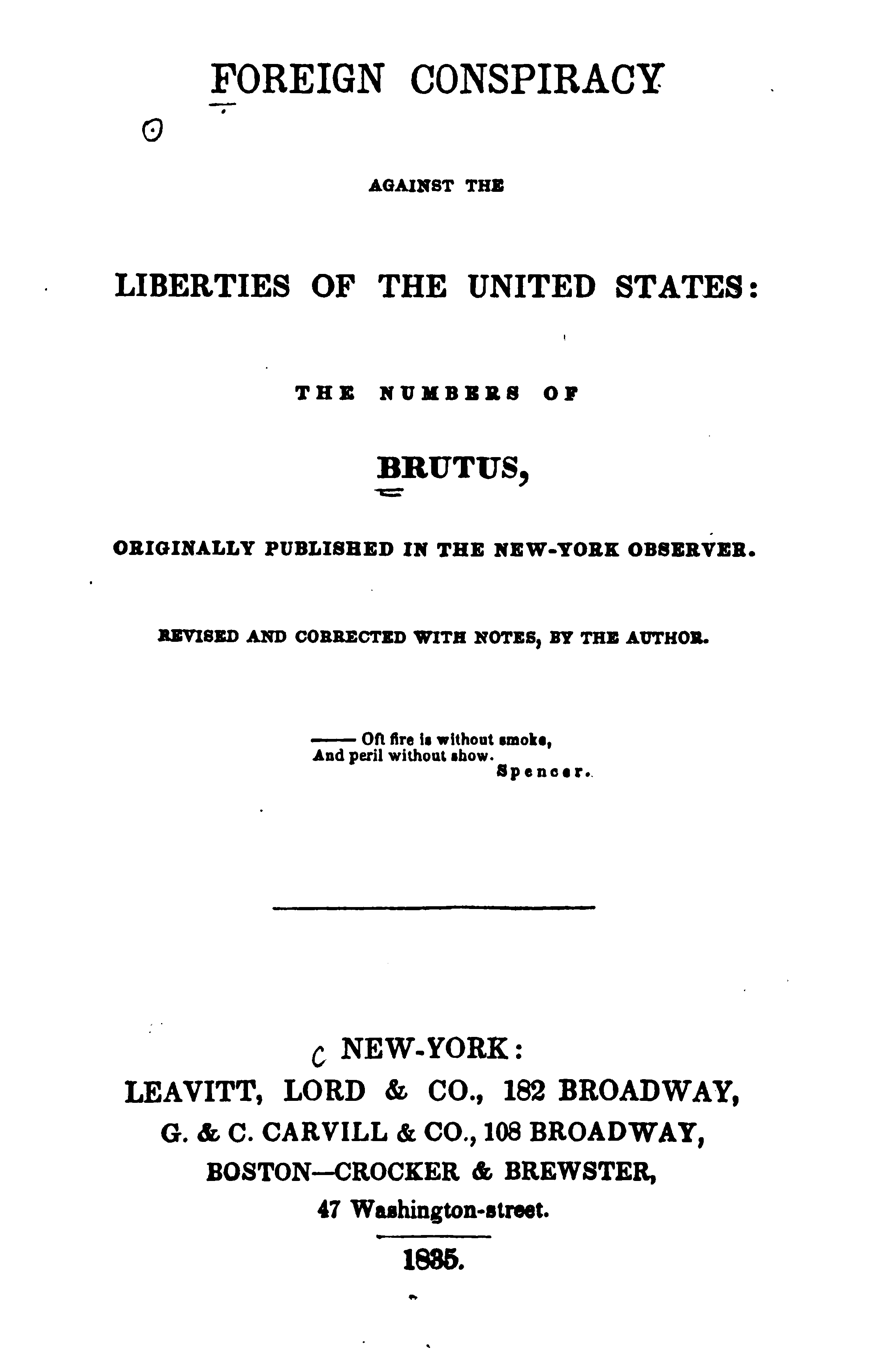
Cover of Foreign Conspiracy Against the Liberties of the United States by Samuel F.B. Morse, 1835 edition

=== Anti-Catholic ===
Morse was a leader in the anti-Catholic and anti-immigration movement of the mid-19th century. In 1836, he ran unsuccessfully for mayor of New York under the anti-immigrant Nativist Party's banner, receiving only 1,496 votes. When Morse visited Rome, he allegedly refused to take his hat off in the presence of the Pope.

Morse worked to unite Protestants against Catholic institutions (including schools), wanted to forbid Catholics from holding public office, and promoted changing immigration laws to limit immigration from Catholic countries. On this topic, he wrote, "We must first stop the leak in the ship through which muddy waters from without threaten to sink us."

He wrote numerous letters to the New York Observer (his brother Sidney was the editor at the time) urging people to fight the perceived Catholic menace. These were widely reprinted in other newspapers. Among other claims, he believed that the Austrian government and Catholic aid organizations were subsidizing Catholic immigration to the United States in order to gain control of the country.

In his Foreign Conspiracy Against the Liberties of the United States, Morse wrote:

Surely American Protestants, freemen, have discernment enough to discover beneath them the cloven foot of this subtle foreign heresy. They will see that Popery is now, what it has ever been, a system of the darkest political intrigue and despotism, cloaking itself to avoid attack under the sacred name of religion. They will be deeply impressed with the truth, that Popery is a political as well as a religious system; that in this respect it differs totally from all other sects, from all other forms of religion in the country.

In the same book, published in 1835 under the name of "Brutus", in speaking of "the foreign Emissaries of Popery re-warded in their own country," said: "Where is Bishop Kelly of Richmond, Va.? He also sojourns with us until his duties to foreign masters are performed, and then is rewarded by promotion." (Patrick Kelly was a native of Ireland, and the first bishop of Richmond, Virginia. When after a couple of years, differences regarding questions of jurisdiction arose between him and Ambrose Maréchal, Archbishop of Baltimore, Kelly was offered the recently vacant See of Waterford and Lismore in his homeland.)

=== Pro-slavery ===
In the 1850s, Morse became well known as a defender of slavery, considering it to be sanctioned by God. In his treatise "An Argument on the Ethical Position of Slavery," he wrote:

My creed on the subject of slavery is short. Slavery per se is not sin. It is a social condition ordained from the beginning of the world for the wisest purposes, benevolent and disciplinary, by Divine Wisdom. The mere holding of slaves, therefore, is a condition having per se nothing of moral character in it, any more than the being a parent, or employer, or ruler.

== Later years ==
=== Litigation over telegraph patent ===
In the United States, Morse held his telegraph patent for many years, but it was both ignored and contested. In 1853, The Telegraph Patent case – O'Reilly v. Morse came before the U.S. Supreme Court where, after very lengthy investigation, Chief Justice Roger B. Taney ruled that Morse had been the first to combine the battery, electromagnetism, the electromagnet, and the correct battery configuration into a workable practical telegraph. However, in spite of this clear ruling, Morse still received no official recognition from the United States government.

The Supreme Court did not accept all of Morse's claims. The O'Reilly v. Morse case has become widely known among patent lawyers because the Supreme Court explicitly denied Morse's claim 8 for any and all use of the electromagnetic force for purposes of transmitting intelligible signals to any distance.

The Supreme Court sustained, however, Morse's claim to such telecommunication when effectuated by means of Morse's inventive "repeater" apparatus. This was an electrical circuit in which a cascade of many sets comprising a relay and a battery were connected in series, so that when each relay closed, it closed a circuit to cause the next battery to power the succeeding relay, as suggested in the accompanying figure. This caused Morse's signal to pass along the cascade without degrading into noise as its amplitude decreased with the distance traveled. (Each time the amplitude of the signal approaches the noise level, the repeater [in effect, a nonlinear amplifier] boosts the signal amplitude well above the noise level.) This use of "repeaters" permitted a message to be sent to great distances, which was previously not feasible.

The Supreme Court thus held that Morse could properly claim a patent monopoly on the system or process of transmitting signals at any distance by means of the repeater circuitry indicated above, but he could not properly claim a monopoly over any and all uses of electromagnetic force to transmit signals. The apparatus limitation in the former type of claim limited the patent monopoly to what Morse taught and gave the world. The lack of that limitation in the latter type of claim (i.e., claim 8) both gave Morse more than was commensurate with what he had contributed to society and discouraged the inventive efforts of others who might come up with different and/or better ways to send signals at a distance using the electromagnetic force.

The problem that Morse faced (the deterioration of the signal with distance) and how he solved it is discussed in more detail in the article O'Reilly v. Morse. In summary, the solution, as the Supreme Court stated, was the repeater apparatus described in the preceding paragraphs.

The importance of this legal precedent in patent law cannot be overstated, as it became the foundation of the law governing the eligibility of computer program-implemented inventions (as well as inventions implementing natural laws) to be granted patents.

Morse's "repeater" circuit for telegraphy was the basis for the Supreme Court's holding some claims of Morse's patent valid.

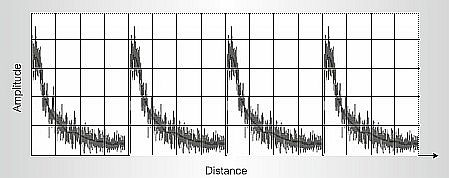
Effect of repeaters

=== Foreign recognition ===
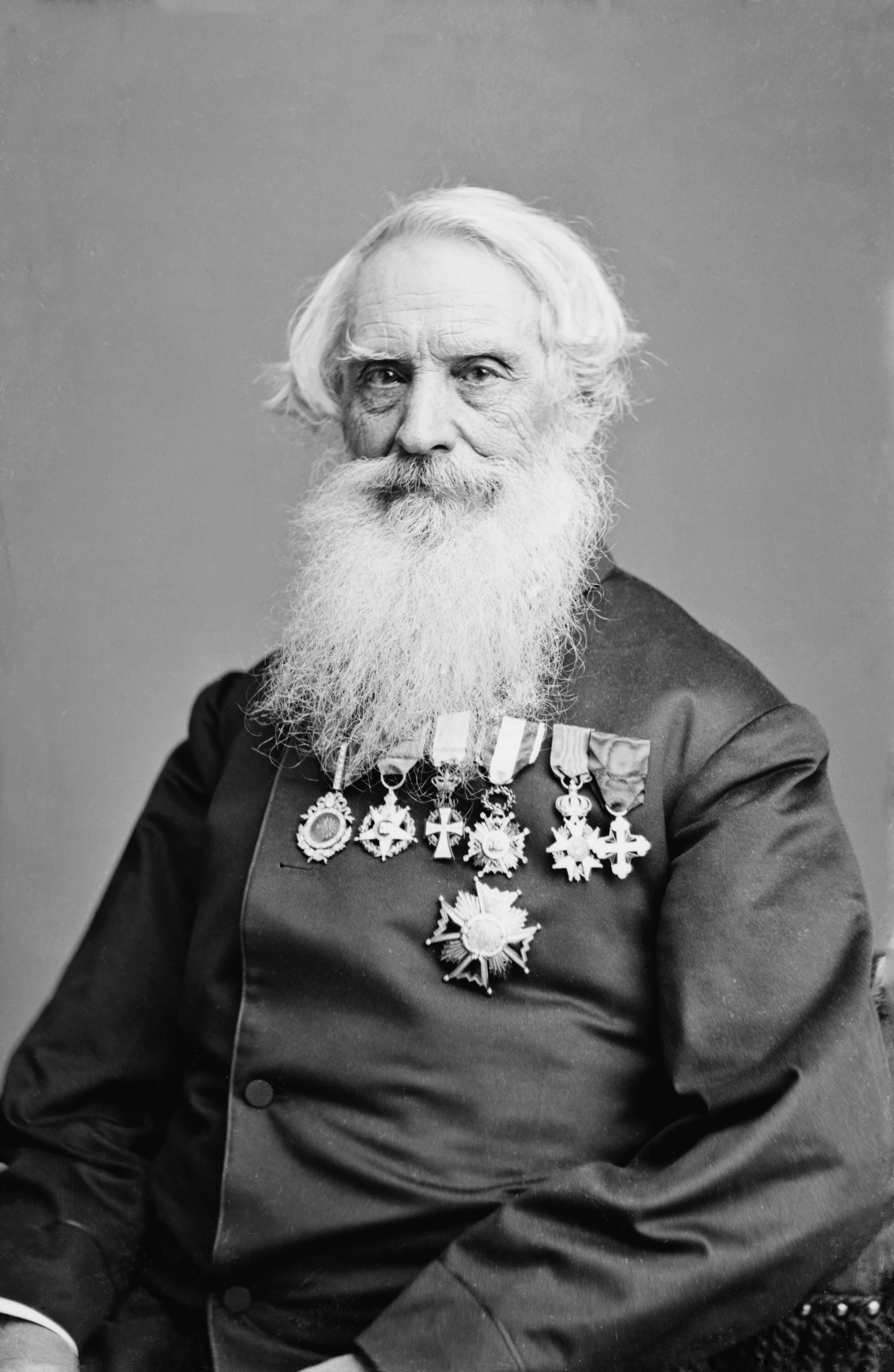
Portrait of Samuel F. B. Morse taken by Mathew Brady, in 1866. Medals worn (from wearer's right to left, top row): Nichan Iftikhar (Ottoman); Order of the Tower and Sword (Portugal); Order of the Dannebrog (Denmark); cross of the Order of Isabella the Catholic (Spain); Legion of Honour (France); Order of Saints Maurice and Lazarus (Italy). Bottom row: Grand cross of the Order of Isabella the Catholic (Spain)

Assisted by the American ambassador in Paris, the governments of Europe were approached about their long neglect of Morse while their countries were using his invention. There was a widespread recognition that something must be done, and in 1858 Morse was awarded the sum of 400,000 French francs (equivalent to about $80,000 at the time) by the governments of France, Austria, Belgium, the Netherlands, Piedmont, Russia, Sweden, Tuscany, and the Ottoman Empire, each of which contributed a share according to the number of Morse instruments in use in each country. In 1858, he was also elected a foreign member of the Royal Swedish Academy of Sciences.

=== Transatlantic cable ===
Morse lent his support to Cyrus West Field's ambitious plan to construct the first transoceanic telegraph line. Morse had experimented with underwater telegraph circuits since 1842. He invested $10,000 in Field's Atlantic Telegraph Company, took a seat on its board of directors, and was appointed honorary "Electrician". In 1856, Morse traveled to London to help Charles Tilston Bright and Edward Whitehouse test a 2,000-mile-length of spooled cable.

After the first two cable-laying attempts failed, Field reorganized the project, removing Morse from direct involvement. Though the cable broke three times during the third attempt, it was successfully repaired, and the first transatlantic telegraph messages were sent in 1858. The cable failed after just three months of use. Though Field had to wait out the Civil War, the cable laid in 1866 proved more durable, and the era of reliable transatlantic telegraph service had begun.

In addition to the telegraph, Morse invented a marble-cutting machine that could carve three-dimensional sculptures in marble or stone. He could not patent it, however, because of an existing 1820 Thomas Blanchard design.

=== Last years and death ===
Samuel Morse gave large sums to charity. He also became interested in the relationship of science and religion and provided the funds to establish a lectureship on "the relation of the Bible to the Sciences". Though he was rarely awarded any royalties for the later uses and implementations of his inventions, he was able to live comfortably.

Morsemere in Ridgefield, New Jersey, takes its name from Morse, who had bought property there to build a home, but died before its completion.

He died of pneumonia in New York City on April 2, 1872, and was interred at Green-Wood Cemetery in Brooklyn. By the time of his death, his estate was valued at some $500,000 ($13.4 million today).

In his will he provided an award medal that is presented annually by New York University to one undergraduate student who shows special ability in physics.

== Honors and awards ==
Morse was elected a member of the American Antiquarian Society in 1815.

Despite honors and financial awards received from foreign countries, there was no such recognition in the U.S. until he neared the end of his life when on June 10, 1871, a bronze statue of Samuel Morse was unveiled in Central Park, New York City. An engraved portrait of Morse appeared on the reverse side of the United States two-dollar bill silver certificate series of 1896. He was depicted along with Robert Fulton. An example can be seen on the website of the Federal Reserve Bank of San Francisco's website in their "American Currency Exhibit".

A blue plaque was erected to commemorate him at 141 Cleveland Street, London, where he lived from 1812 to 1815.

In 1848, Morse was elected as a member to the American Philosophical Society.

According to his The New York Times obituary published on April 3, 1872, Morse received respectively the decoration of the Atiq Nishan-i-Iftikhar (English: Order of Glory) [first medal on wearer's right depicted in photo of Morse with medals], set in diamonds, from Sultan Abdülmecid of Turkey (c.1847), a "golden snuff box containing the Prussian gold medal for scientific merit" from the King of Prussia (1851); the Great Gold Medal of Arts and Sciences from the King of Württemberg (1852); and the Great Golden Medal of Science and Arts from the Emperor of Austria (1855); a cross of Chevalier in the Légion d'honneur from the Emperor of France; the Cross of a Knight of the Order of the Dannebrog from the King of Denmark (1856); the Cross of Knight Commander of the Order of Isabella the Catholic, from the Queen of Spain, besides being elected member of innumerable scientific and art societies in this [United States] and other countries. Other awards include Order of the Tower and Sword from the kingdom of Portugal (1860), and Italy conferred on him the insignia of chevalier of the Order of Saints Maurice and Lazarus in 1864. Morse's telegraph was recognized as an IEEE Milestone in 1988.

In 1975, Morse was inducted into the National Inventors Hall of Fame.

On April 1, 2012, Google announced the release of "Gmail Tap", an April Fools' Day joke that allowed users to use Morse Code to send text from their mobile phones. Morse's great-great-grandnephew Reed Morse—a Google engineer—was instrumental in the prank, which became a real product. (Note: Introducing Gmail Tap. Mail.google.com. Retrieved on October 6, 2013.)

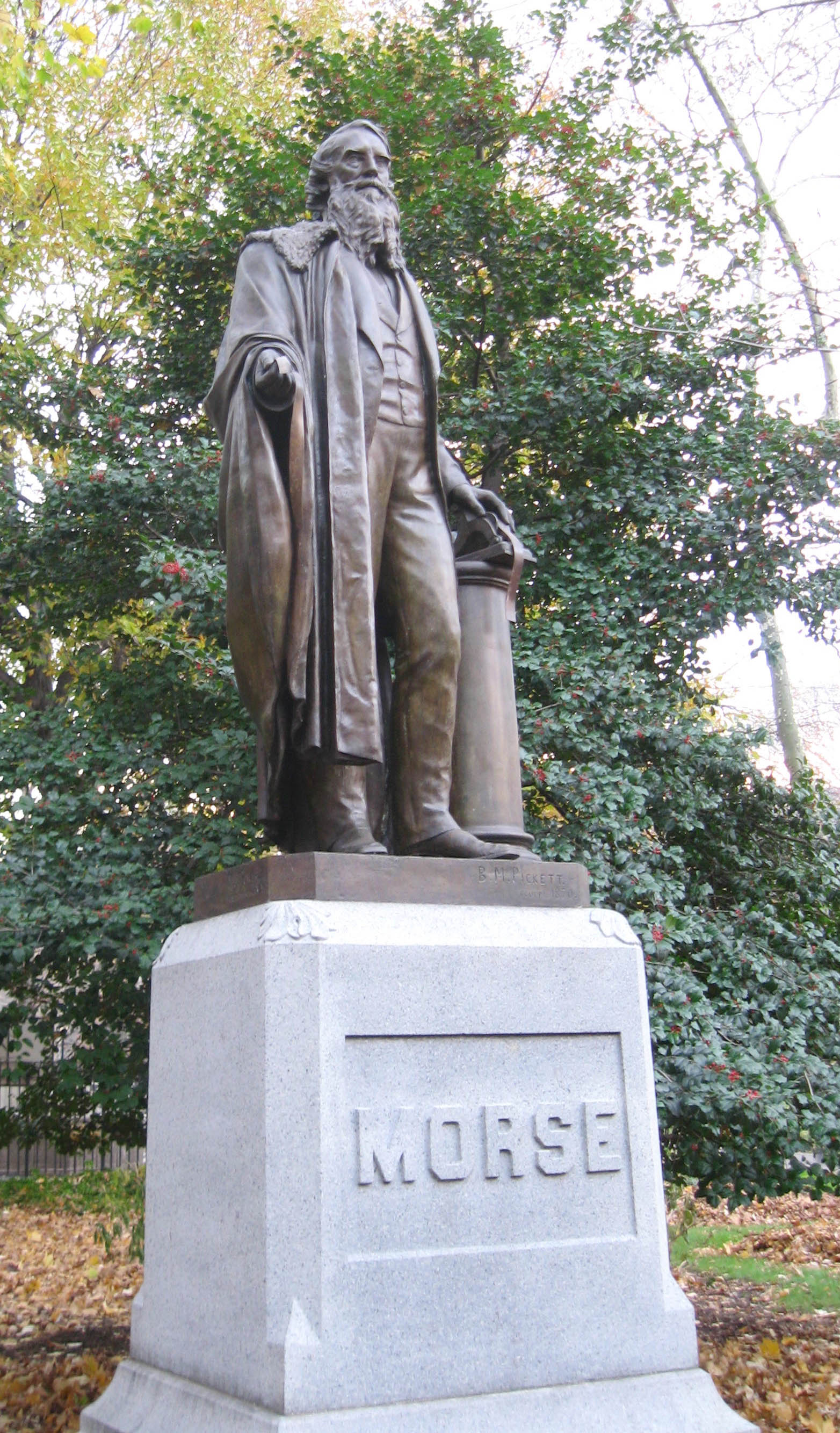
Statue of Samuel F. B. Morse by Byron M. Picket, New York's Central Park, dedicated 1871

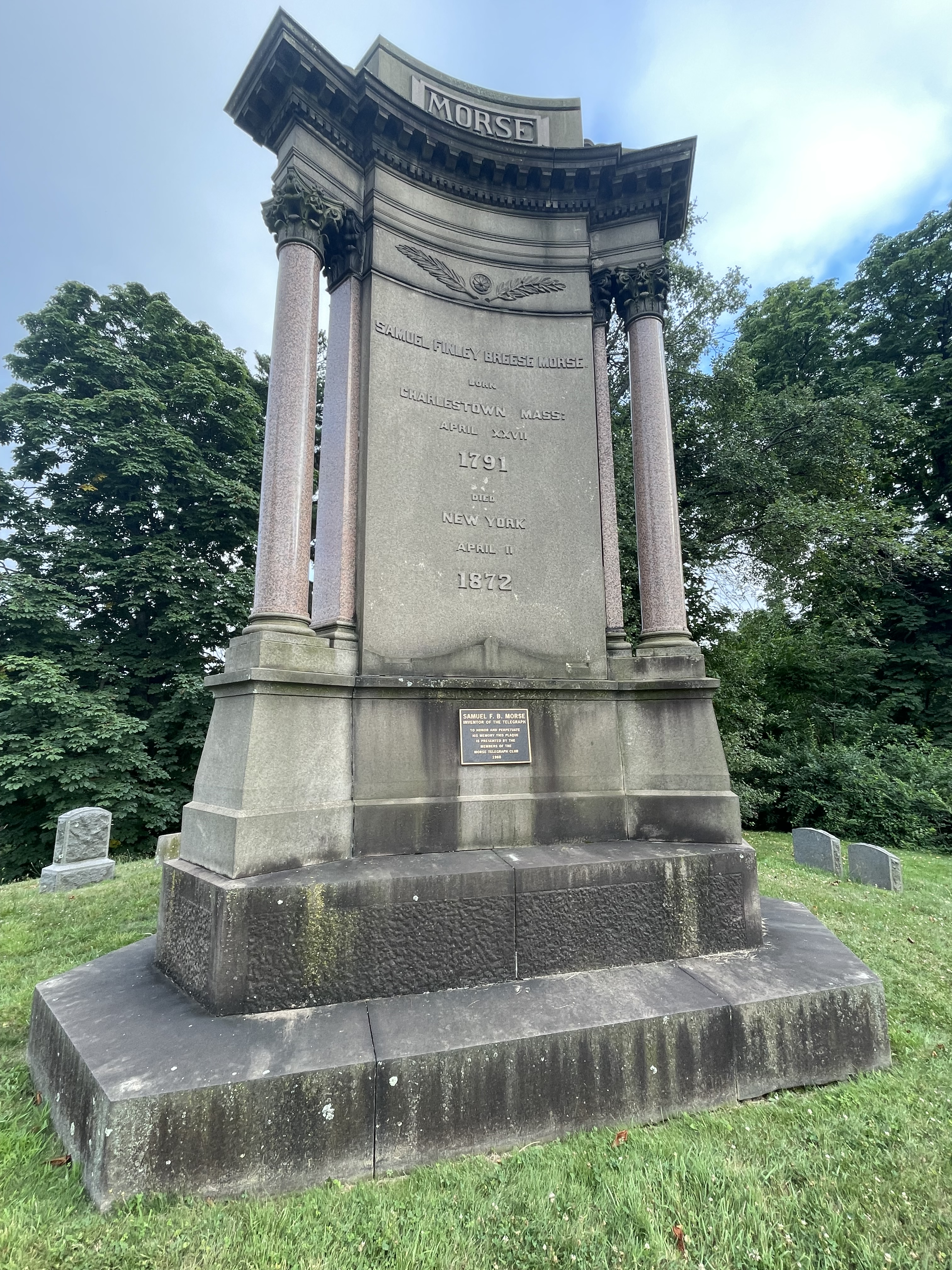
Samuel Morse gravesite at Green-wood Cemetery

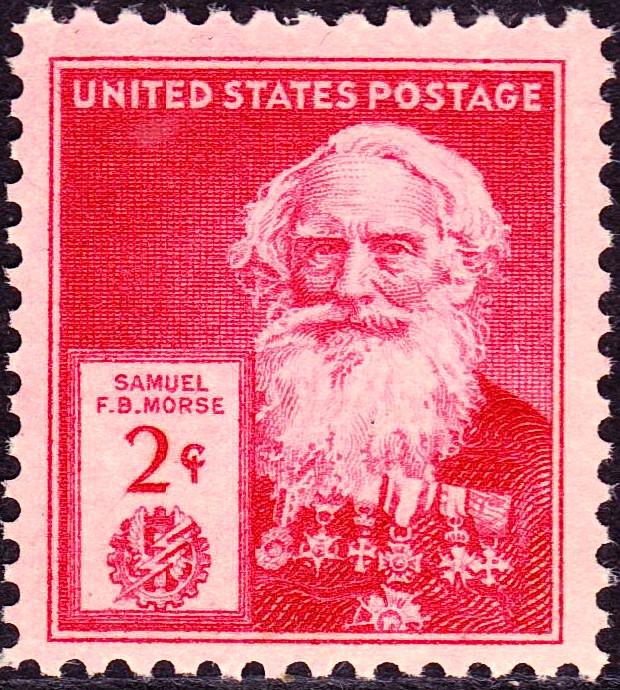
Morse was honored on the US Famous Americans Series postal issue of 1940.

Coat of Arms of Samuel Morse

== Patents ==
- US Patent 1,647, Improvement in the mode of communicating information by signals by the application of electro-magnetism, June 20, 1840
- US Patent 1,647 (Reissue #79), Improvement in the mode of communicating information by signals by the application of electro-magnetism, January 15, 1846
- US Patent 1,647 (Reissue #117), Improvement in electro-magnetic telegraphs, June 13, 1848
- US Patent 3,316, Method of introducing wire into metallic pipes, October 5, 1843
- US Patent 4,453, Improvement in Electro-magnetic telegraphs, April 11, 1846
- US Patent 4,453 (Reissue #118), Improvement in Electro-magnetic telegraphs, June 13, 1848
- US Patent 6,420, Improvement in electric telegraphs, May 1, 1849

== See also ==
- Daniel Davis Jr.
- Seconds pendulum
- Telegraph in United States history

== General and cited references ==
- Bellion, Wendy (2011), Citizen Spectator: Art, Illusion, and Visual Perception in Early National America, Chapel Hill: University of North Carolina Press, ISBN 978-0-8078-3388-9
- Bellis, Mary (2009), Biography of Samuel F.B. Morse, Inventor of the Telegraph
- Bellis, Mary (2009a), Samuel Morse and the Invention of the Telegraph
- Carter, Samuel III (1968), Cyrus Field: Man of Two Worlds, New York: G.P. Putnam's Sons
- Gleick, J. (2011), The Information: a History, a Theory, a Flood, London, Fourth Estate
- Invent Now staff (February 19, 2007), Inventor profile: Samuel F. B. Morse, National Inventors Hall of Fame Foundation, archived from the original on October 27, 2013
- Jackson, Kenneth T.; Keller, Lisa; Flood, Nancy, eds. (2010), The Encyclopedia of New York City (2nd ed.), Yale University Press, p. 855, ISBN 978-0-300-11465-2
- Mabee, Carleton (2004), Samuel F. B. Morse, archived from the original on December 12, 2006
- McCullough, David (2011), The Greater Journey: Americans in Paris, Simon & Schuster, ISBN 978-1-4165-7176-6
- McCullough, David (September 2011), "Reversal of Fortune", Smithsonian, 42 (5): 80–88
- McEwen, Neal (1997), Morse Code or Vail Code? Did Samuel F. B. Morse Invent the Code as We Know it Today?, The Telegraph Office
- Morse, Samuel (December 26, 2006) [1839], "Letter to the New-York Observer Vol. 17, No. 16 (April 20, 1839) p. 62.", The Daguerrotipe, The Daguerreian Society, archived from the original on November 15, 2008
- Morse, Samuel F. B. (May 2, 2013) [19], Samuel F. B. Morse, His Letters and Journals (Part 5 of 9), FullTextArchive.com — Produced by Carlo Traverso, Richard Prairie, and PG Distributed Proofreaders. This file was produced from images generously made available by the Bibliothèque nationale de France (BnF/Gallica)
- Morse, Samuel F. B. (June 20, 1840), U.S. Patent No. 1647, Telegraph Signs, archived from the original on December 5, 2021
- NYT staff (November 11, 1852), "Franklin and his Electric Kite – Prosecution and Progress of Electrical researches – Historical Sketch of the Electric Telegraph – Claims of Morse and others – Uses of Electricity – Telegraphic Statistics", The New York Times
- Silverman, Kenneth (2004), Lightning Man: The Accursed Life of Samuel F. B. Morse, Hachette Books, ISBN 978-0-306-81394-8
- Stover, John F. (1987), History of the Baltimore and Ohio Railroad, West Lafayette, Indiana: Purdue University Press, pp. 59–60, ISBN 978-0-911198-81-2
- Standage, Tom (1998), The Victorian Internet, London: Weidenfeld & Nicolson
- Wilson, Courtney B. (2003), The Baltimore & Ohio Railroad Museum: The Birthplace of American Railroading, Baltimore, Maryland: Traub Company, p. 11, ISBN 978-1-932387-59-9

Attribution
