= Speedwell Ironworks =

- The Factory, Speedwell Village
- U.S. National Register of Historic Places
- U.S. National Historic Landmark
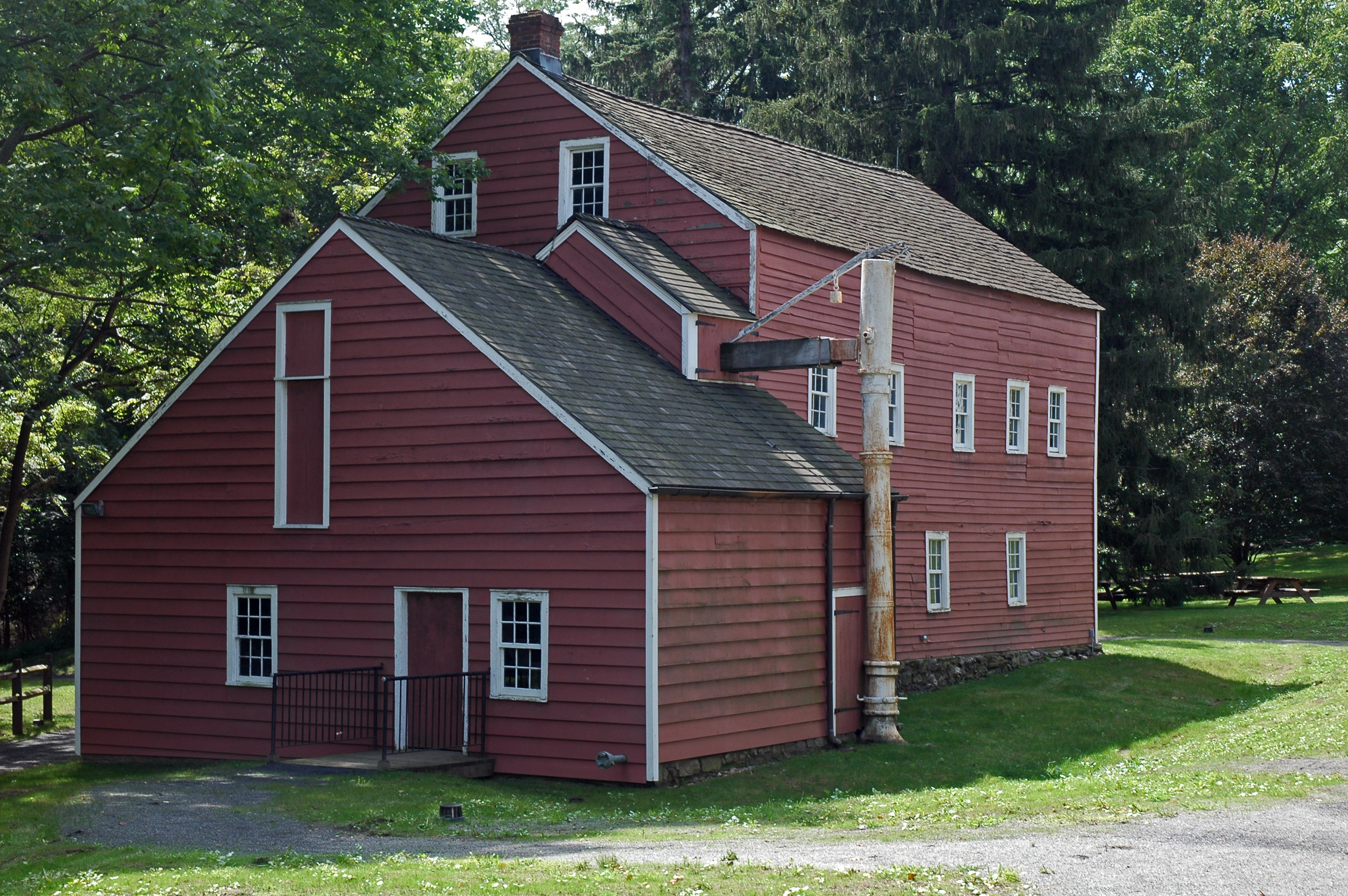
- The Factory House, birthplace of the Morse electric telegraph, pictured in 2006

- Location within Morris County, New Jersey Location within New Jersey Location within the United States
- Location: 333 Speedwell Avenue, Morristown, New Jersey
- Coordinates: 40°48′50.976″N 74°28′49.7568″W
- Built: 1837
- NRHP reference No.: 74001186

Significant dates
- Added to NRHP: September 13, 1974
- Designated NHL: May 30, 1974

Speedwell Ironworks was an ironworks in Speedwell Village, on Speedwell Avenue (part of U.S. Route 202), just north of downtown Morristown, in Morris County, New Jersey, United States. At this site Alfred Vail and Samuel Morse first demonstrated their electric telegraph. Speedwell Ironworks also provided most of the machinery for the SS Savannah, the first steamship to cross the Atlantic Ocean. The site is still open to the public, and has seven buildings on display. The site, now named Historical Speedwell, is a historic site of the Morris County Park Commission. It was designated a National Historic Landmark in 1974.

== History ==
Situated at a natural gorge of the Whippany River, several hydraulic powered forges existed, predating the establishment of the ironworks by Stephen Vail and two business partners. Vail became sole owner of the works in 1815 and expanded it, producing a variety of agricultural and industrial machinery. The ironworks innovated the first durable iron tire for railroad locomotives in January 1836. With changing industrial trends and a decline in the flow of the Whippany River, the ironworks were shut down in 1873, its equipment being sold to ironworks in Brooklyn and Coatbridge, Scotland. The remains of the Ironworks buildings burned in 1908, and the property is now a public park.

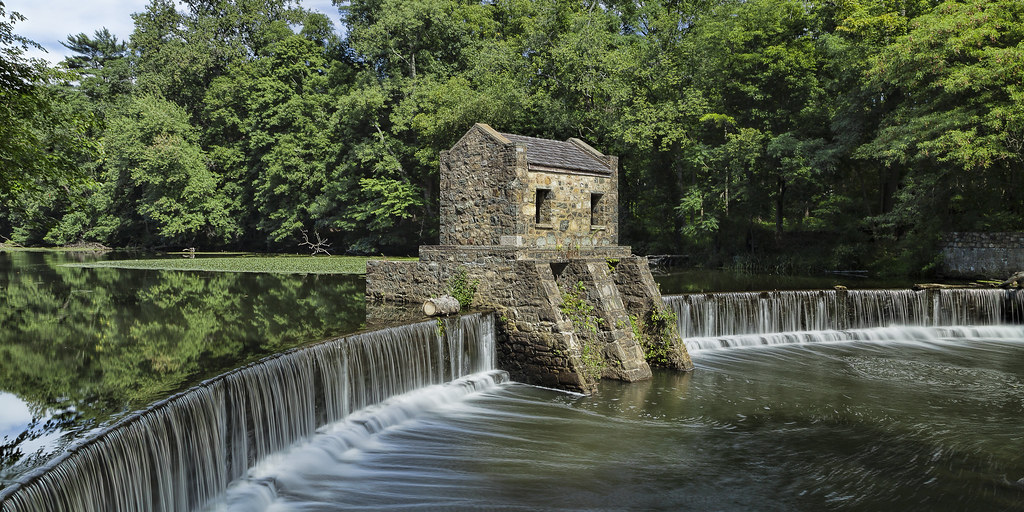
Speedwell Park, a public park situated on Stephen Vail's former Ironworks, 2016

Stephen Vail also bought an adjacent 40-acre (16 ha) lot to which he eventually retreated in 1844 for an active retirement. The Vail Homestead or Speedwell Village, as it is sometimes known, is the site of Historic Speedwell, a National Historic Landmark, part of the Morris County Park Commission. The site is set up as an open-air 19th century estate, complete with residential buildings, a granary and two carriage houses. The site is currently open to the public, with 19th century ironworking materials and historical artifacts about communication on exhibit.

Today, the site is maintained as a public park and museum by the Morris County Park Commission. It includes nine buildings furnished to depict life at Speedwell during the early 19th century. The Vail House, a historic house museum restored to 1840s period style, possesses some original family furniture and Vail memorabilia. The Wheel House houses an operational 24-foot (7.3 m) overshot waterwheel. The Homestead Carriage House houses an exhibit on the SS Savannah, the first steamship to cross the Atlantic Ocean, with an engine built at the Speedwell Ironworks, and an exhibit about the history of the ironworks. The Ford Cottage is a 19th-century saltbox cottage, the Moses Estey House is an 18th-century Georgian mansion, and the early 19th century L'Hommedieu-Gwinnup House houses changing exhibits and education space. On exhibit in the factory buildings are 19th century ironworking materials and historical artifacts of communication.

Speedwell Village was declared a National Historic Landmark in 1974, preserving seven buildings. The designation was made in recognition of the role the facility and its proprietors the Vails played in the development of the telegraph.

== Telegraph ==
The old factory building on the grounds of the ironworks was constructed by Stephen Vail for hobby purposes upon his retirement. It is the site of the first public demonstration of the Morse electromagnetic telegraph on January 11, 1838. Although Morse and Alfred Vail had conducted most of the research and development in the ironworks facilities, they chose the factory house for demonstration. Without the repeater, the range of the telegraph was limited to two miles (3 km). The inventors had pulled two miles (3 km) of wires inside the factory house for the demonstration. The first public transmission was witnessed by a mostly local crowd.

== See also ==
- National Register of Historic Places listings in Morris County, New Jersey
- List of National Historic Landmarks in New Jersey
- List of museums in New Jersey
- Electric Telegraph
