= Edward Lewis Young =

American banker (1862-1940)

- Born: 1862
- Died: March 24, 1940 (aged 78)
- Parent: Edward Faitoute Condict Young

Edward Lewis Young (1862 – March 24, 1940), was the Senior Director of First National Bank of Jersey City and was on the Morris Canal Commission.
