= Young Skyheater =

Skyheater

General information
- Type: Homebuilt aircraft
- National origin: United States
- Designer: Ed Young

The Young Skyheater is an American aircraft that was designed by Ed Young for homebuilt construction.

== Design and development ==
The Skyheater is a two-seat, single engine, conventional landing gear-equipped, parasol wing aircraft. Rather than a separate distinct vertical tail section, the Skyheater fuselage is tapered only along its sides, leaving a square tail or full-height dorsal fin extending to the wing root. The fuselage is constructed of welded steel tubing with fabric covered control surfaces. The wings are of all aluminum construction.

== Specifications (Young Skyheater) ==
Data from Air Progress

General characteristics

- Crew: 1
- Capacity: 1
- Length: 21 ft (6.4 m)
- Wingspan: 28 ft (8.5 m)
- Powerplant: 1 × Continental O-300 horizontally-opposed piston engine, 145 hp (108 kW)
- Propellers: 2-bladed

== See also ==
Aircraft of comparable role, configuration, and era

- Baker MB-1 Delta Kitten Fuselage faired tail homebuilt
