= Malapardis, New Jersey =

- Unincorporated community
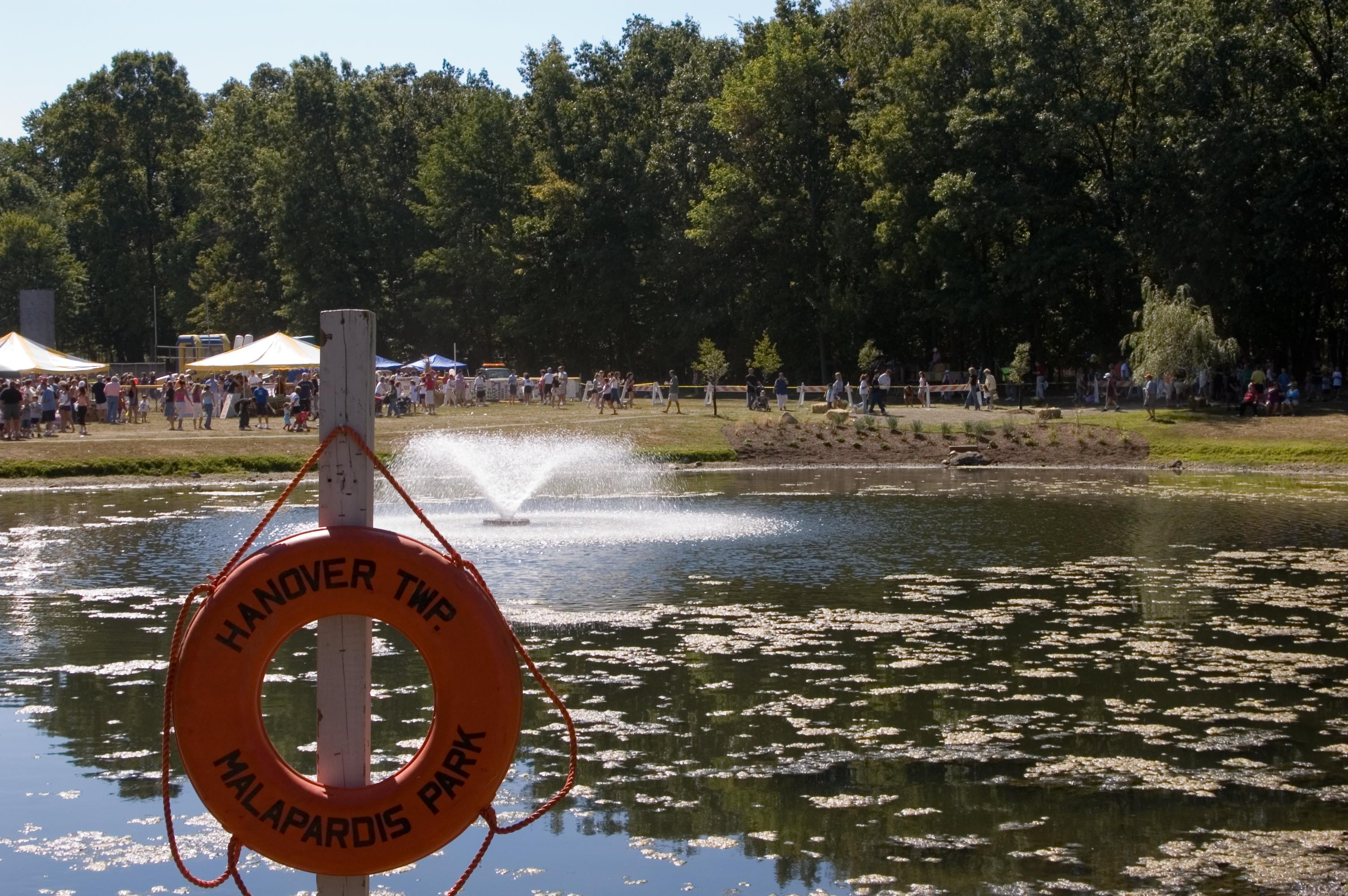
- Malapardis Park in 2006
- Interactive map of Malapardis, New Jersey
- Coordinates: 40.8295441°N 74.4318200°W
- Country: United States
- State: New Jersey
- County: Morris
- Township: Hanover
- Elevation: 269 ft (82 m)
- ZIP Code: 07981
- Area code: 973, 862

Malapardis is an unincorporated community located within Hanover Township, New Jersey, United States.

== History ==
Malapardis was settled sometime in 1735. The name is derived from the Lenape word “Malapahus” which means “place of the poor flint.” The first settlement in Malapardis was located along Stony Brook. It formerly had a woolen mill and iron forge, but has since been redeveloped.

The forge at Malapardis was established sometime between 1750 and the American Revolutionary War. At that time, the roads were so poor that the iron for the forges was brought in by horseback, as wagons could not be used.

Another early building was the carding and fulling mill founded by Abraham Fairchild in 1810; Fairchild brought in machines from the New York State Prison. This building was later replaced on the same site by the wool mill established by G.R. Fairchild. Among the other historic buildings was the Stony Brook Mill, which was built in the late 1890s. This building was torn down in the 1980s.

In 1820, a school district for Malapardis was established. This was numbered New Jersey School District #86. In the 1920s, three schools operated in Malapardis. The Malapardis School was converted to the Hannover Township municipal building in the 1950s. The old wooden Malapardis schoolhouse was turned into the rectory for the Saint John the Baptist Ukrainian Catholic Church. This church was established near Malapardis Creek by Ukrainians in 1921. These buildings are now part of Whippany.

In 1905, traces of an old Native American settlement were still visible between Malapardis and nearby Littleton, to the west.

As the population of New Jersey grew, community boundaries shifted, and Malapardis "receded", according to one author. Malapardis and Whippany had been established in the 1700s, two centuries before Cedar Knolls, which was established to the west of Malapardis in 1913. When Whippany and Cedar Knolls were established as Census Designated Places, their boundaries were established at Interstate 287. A number of sources thus call Malapardis a "former village" or "once thriving" community.

== Geography ==
The community sits at a major junction between Interstate 287, New Jersey Route 24 and New Jersey Route 10.

Malapardis Brook is a stream that runs through the community.

== See also ==
- Jacksonville, Morris County, New Jersey
