= Timeline of North American telegraphy =

US & Canada telegraph history: 1844-1861 milestones

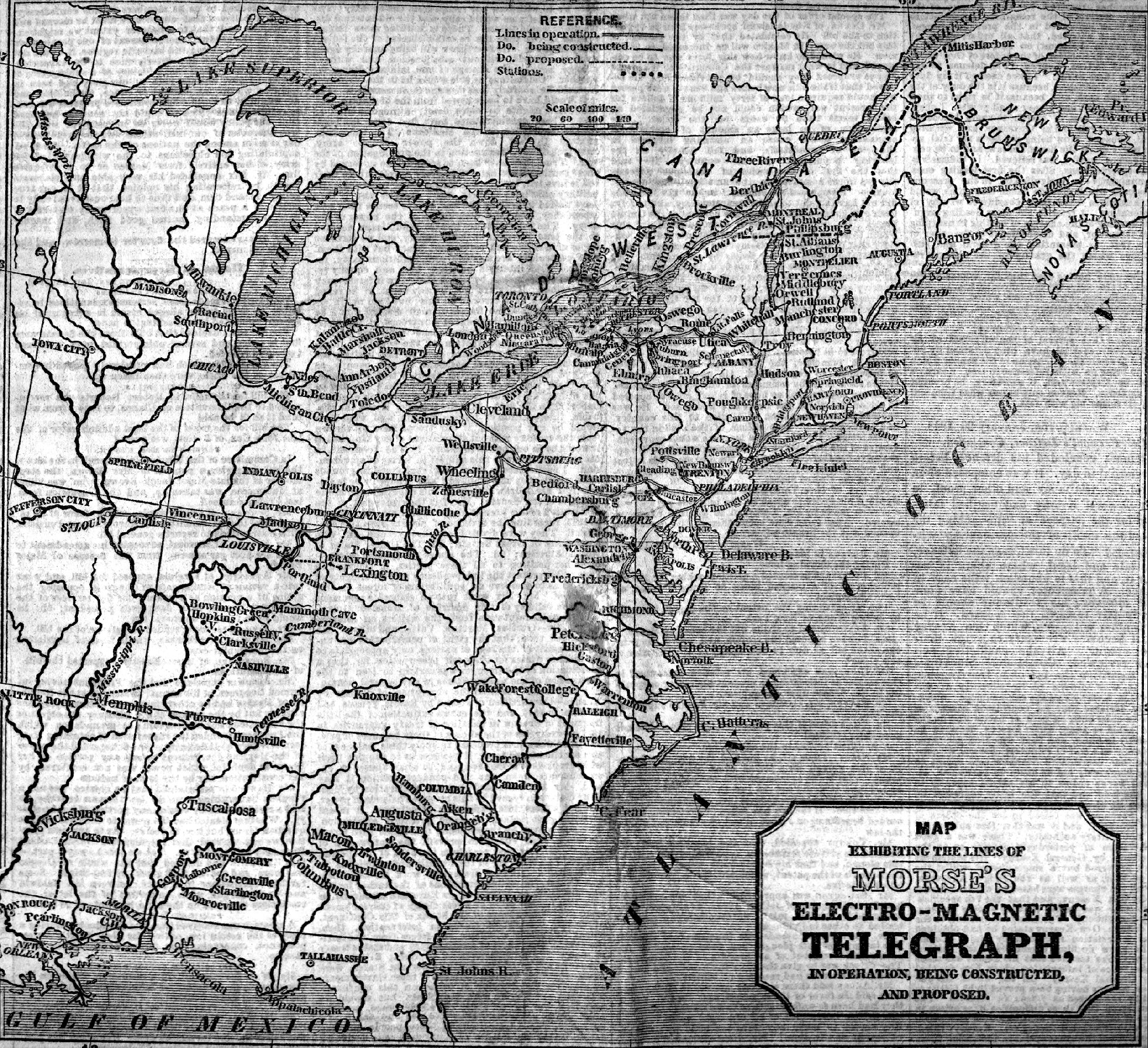
January 22, 1848 map in New York Herald showing extent of existing and planned North American telegraph lines. At this time, the service area for the United States reached Petersburg, Virginia in the south, Portland, Maine in the northeast, Cleveland, Ohio in the northwest, and as far west as East St. Louis, Illinois. In Canada, lines reached from Hamilton, Ontario to Quebec City, and linked to the United States via Buffalo, New York.

The timeline of North American telegraphy is a chronology of notable events in the history of the electric telegraphy in the United States and Canada, including the rapid spread of telegraphic communications starting from 1844 and completion of the first transcontinental telegraph line in 1861.

== Timeline ==
=== Early events ===
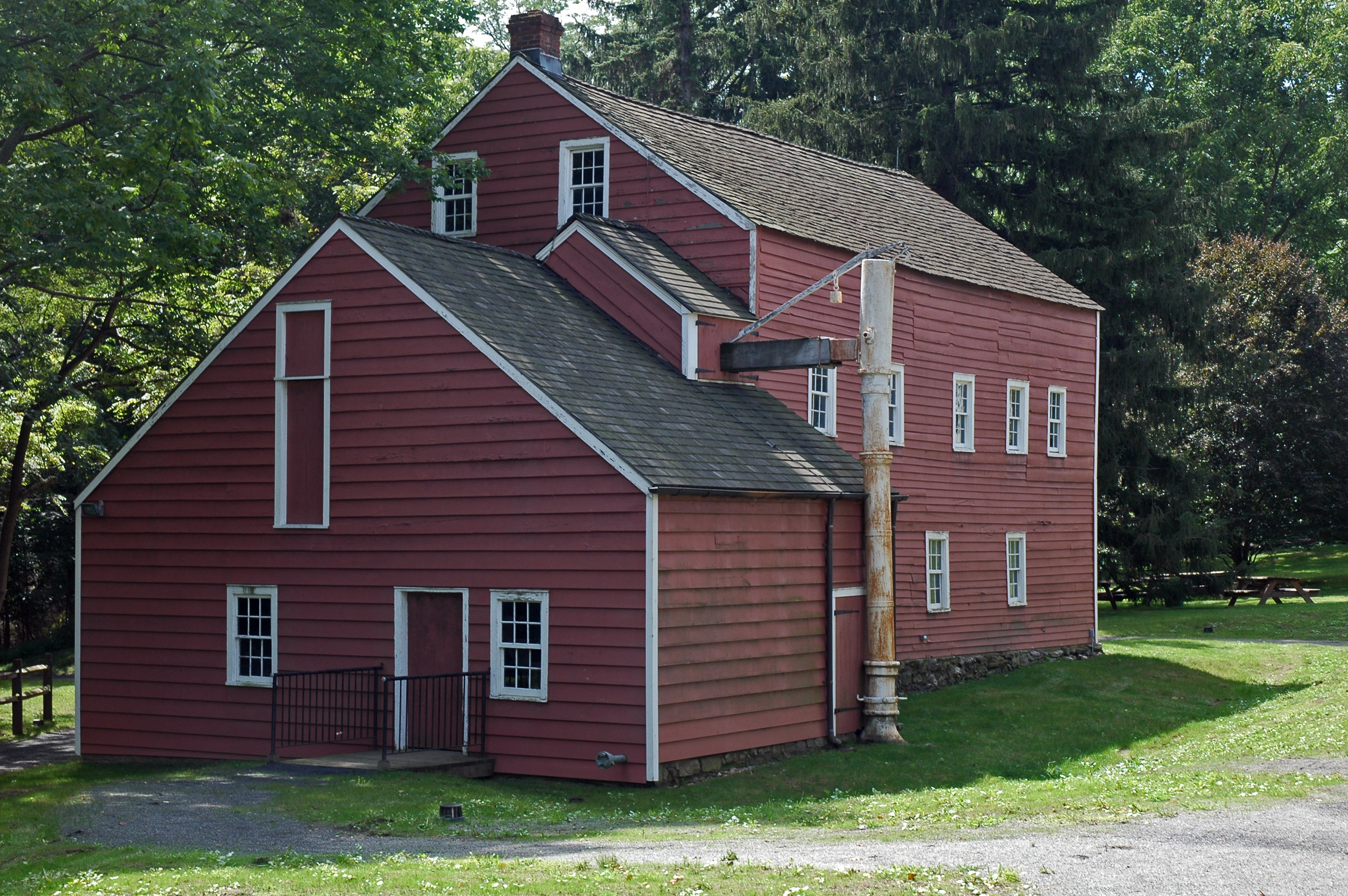
The Speedwell Ironworks, site of Morse's 1838 telegraph demonstration.

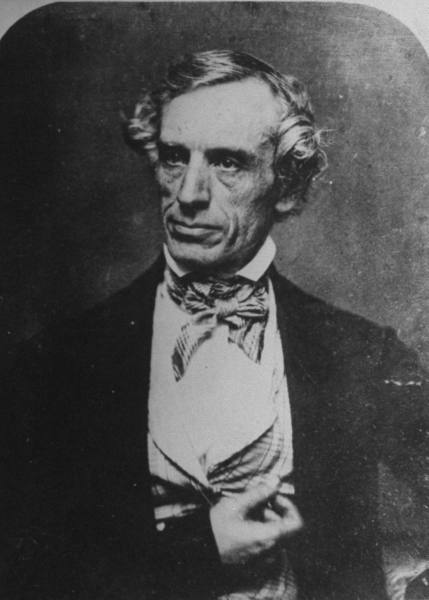
Samuel Morse in 1845.

- 1826-27: Harrison Gray Dyar successfully experiments with electrical telegraphy but abandons the pursuit.
- 1836: David Alter of Pennsylvania develops a working electrical telegraph system, but never develops the idea into a practical system.
- Jan 1837: Samuel Chester Reid proposes that the U.S. Congress fund an optical telegraph (semaphore line) from New York to New Orleans.
- Sept 1837: Morse employs Alfred Vail to improve his telegraph from demonstration purposes for a share of future patent rights.
- Sept 1837: Samuel Morse files for a patent for his electrical telegraph in the United States.
- 6 Jan 1838: Samuel Morse sends his first public demonstration message over two miles of wire at Speedwell Ironworks in New Jersey. Morse also demonstrates his invention to the Franklin Institute and President Martin Van Buren in early 1838.
- April 1838: Congressman Francis Ormand Jonathan Smith proposes to give $30,000 for Morse to build a line to demonstrate the telegraph, but the bill does not pass.
- 20 June 1840: Morse obtains patent.
- 1843

- 3 March 1843: The United States Congress appropriates funds for Samuel Morse to lay a telegraph line from Washington, D.C. to Baltimore.
- 21 October 1843: Originally Morse decided to lay his wire underground, and asked Ezra Cornell to lay the line using a special cable-laying plow that Cornell had developed. Wire began to be laid in Baltimore on October 21, 1843, but the project was stopped after 15 km of wire was laid because the line was failing. Morse learned that Cooke and Wheatstone in England were now using poles for their lines, and he decided to follow that lead.

- 1844

- 1 April 1844: Work begins in Washington on laying the line to Baltimore using poles. Gamaliel "Gam" E. Smith, Esq., an acquaintance of Samuel Morse and a lighthouse-building mason from Maine, was chosen to complete the job. He used chestnut poles of seven meters in height, and 60 meters apart. Two wires were laid, Number 16 copper wire, covered by cotton thread with shellac, and a covering mixture of "beeswax, resin, linseed oil, and asphalt.".
- 1 May 1844: Test of line conveys news of the Whig Party's nomination of Henry Clay for U.S. President from the party's convention in Baltimore to the Capitol Building in Washington.
- 24 May 1844: Morse's first message over the Baltimore-Washington telegraph line, "What hath God wrought!" is transmitted, chosen from the Bible for Morse by Annie G. Ellsworth, because she knew Morse was religious.
- Summer 1844: To generate interest in building a line from New York to Boston, Cornell strings short exhibition line in Boston, from School Street and over Old City Hall to Sudbury Street, which generates public interest, but no investors. Cornell then sets up a similar exhibition in New York.

=== Spread of telegraphic lines ===
==== 1845 ====
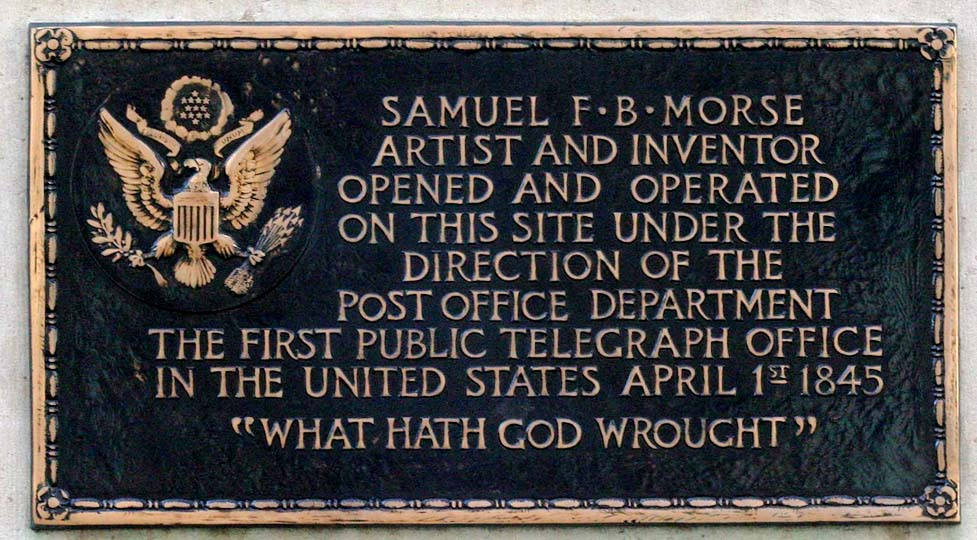
The first telegraph office

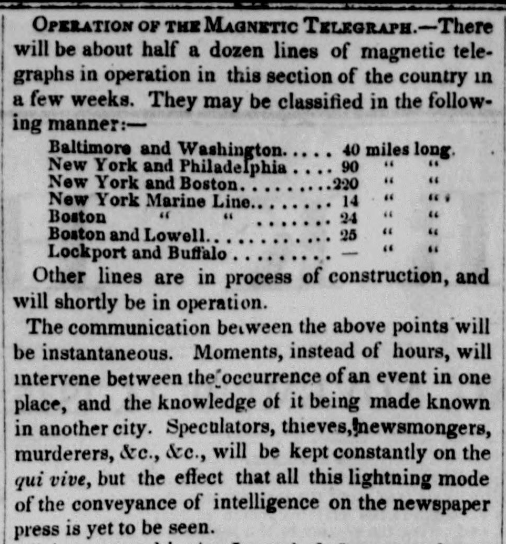
November 14, 1845 report in New York Herald on telegraph lines coming into operation.

- 1 April 1845: First public telegraph office opens in Washington, D.C., under the control of the Postmaster-General. The public now had to pay for messages, which were no longer free.
- 15 May 1845: Morse forms the Magnetic Telegraph Company with Amos Kendall, Francis O.J. Smith, Ezra Cornell, and Orrin S. Wood, with a goal to extend the Washington-Baltimore line to New York.
- 16-18 September 1845: Orrin S. Wood builds a short telegraph line of about one mile from Utica, New York to the city fairgrounds (the site of that year's New York State Fair), for public demonstration.
- September 1845: Henry O'Reilly commences building line intended to extend from Philadelphia to St. Louis. Work on first segment begins in Harrisburg, Pennsylvania, heading east to Philadelphia.
- October 1845: Samuel Colt partners with William Robinson (a New York book dealer) to form the New York and Offing Electric Telegraph Association. A line is laid from an observation tower built on Coney Island to Manhattan to get news from shipping traffic to the New York Mercantile Exchange more quickly. The first line laid across the East River from Brooklyn by Colt on October 23 or 24 quickly fails. The northern terminus of the line becomes the Fulton Ferry in Brooklyn, with news then ferried across the river. A second line across the East River at Hell Gate was operational by March 1846.
- 7 November 1845: Wood builds a line from Buffalo, New York to Lockport, New York (about 30 miles) that goes into operation on November 7 - the first line opened for regular commercial business. The first message announced the electoral victory of the Whigs in Niagara County.
- November 1845: November 14, 1845 New York Herald notes another short planned line, the "Boston Marine Line", which, similar to the New York Offing Line would be a line from Nantasket outside Boston to inner Boston to transmit news from incoming ships. In a letter to the Herald dated February 23, 1846, Ezra Cornell noted that the Boston line had not yet been put into operation.
- 24 November 1845: Line from Lancaster, Pennsylvania to Harrisburg, Pennsylvania (about 35 miles) is completed, but not operational until January 8, 1846.
- November 1845: In the fall of 1845, the Magnetic Telegraph Company commences building a line from Philadelphia to New York. By early November, a 14 mile segment from Philadelphia to Norristown, Pennsylvania had been laid, and opened due to great public interest in the work.

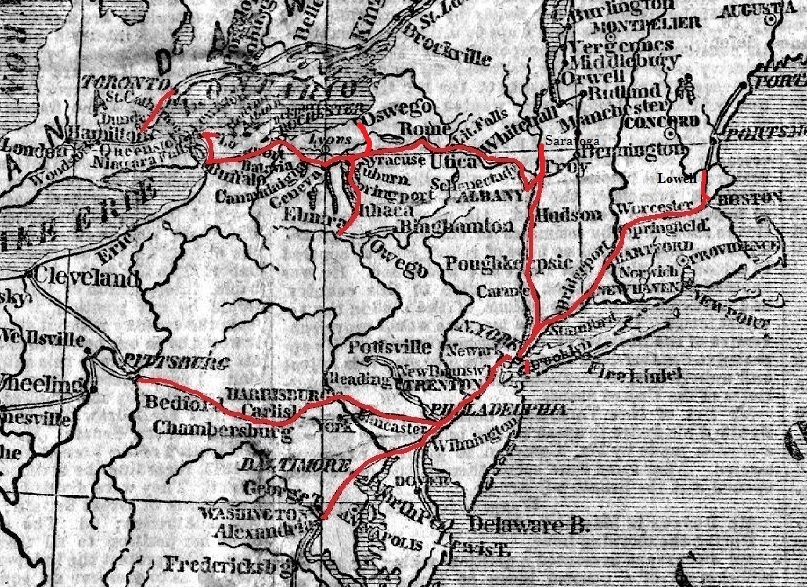
Map shows extent of operational lines by the end of 1846. At the start of the year, there were only four short lines in operation: the original Baltimore-D.C. line, the Buffalo-Lockport line, a short stretch in Philadelphia, and the New York-Coney Island line. By year's end, lines ran from Washington to Boston, west to Pittsburgh, and north from New York City to Albany and west to Buffalo. Rapid expansion was continuing.

==== 1846 ====
- 8 January 1846: Line from Harrisburg, Pennsylvania to Lancaster, Pennsylvania opens. The first telegram from Harrisburg to Lancaster was "Why don't you write, you rascals?" The line did not yet connect to Philadelphia, and only stayed in service until March 1, 1846; Harrisburg service restarted on October 5, 1846.
- 20 January 1846: Philadelphia-New York line is completed to Newark, New Jersey, and to Fort Lee, New Jersey (just across the Hudson River from New York City) two days later. Direct connection to New York City is delayed due to failed attempts to extend wires across the river.
- 31 January 1846: Line from Albany, New York to Utica, New York (96 miles) is open.
- 21 February 1846: Boston to Lowell, Massachusetts line opens, with Sarah Bagley (generally credited as the first female telegraph operator) at Lowell end.
- 22 March 1846: Boston line reaches Springfield, Massachusetts.
- 26 March 1846: Boston line reaches Hartford, Connecticut.
- 7 April 1846: The New York and Offing Company (operating its short line to Coney Island for shipping news) opens an office in Manhattan in the New York Post building.
- 13 April 1846: Line from Philadelphia to Wilmington, Delaware starts operations.
- 1 May 1846: Boston line reaches New Haven, Connecticut about May 1.
- 1 June 1846: Albany-Utica extends further west to Syracuse, New York.
- 5 June 1846: With completion of link between Baltimore and Philadelphia, line from New York City to Washington, D.C. by Magnetic Telegraph Company is now operational.
- 27 June 1846: Commercial line between New York City and Boston completed by F.O.J. Smith. On July 4, the next steamer from Europe to Boston (the Britannia) arrives. Does not appear that telegraph was used, and Herald reports how news traveled from Boston to New York in 10 hours. Next steamer (Cambria) arrives in Boston on July 18 and the New York papers use the new telegraph line.

- 27 June 1846: First transmission over line from Syracuse, New York to Oswego, New York.
- 3 July 1846: Albany line reaches Buffalo, New York.
- 24 July 1846: Line from Troy, New York opens to Saratoga Springs, New York. Line is orphaned from larger network until Albany-New York City line opens on September 9.
- September 1846: Lancaster, Pennsylvania connected to Philadelphia.
- 9 September 1846: Albany-New York City line opens.
- 16 September 1846: Line from Ithaca, New York to Auburn, New York (43 miles) opens. Service is extended to Elmira, New York later in the year. Elmira service stops after a few months due to lack of business; a new service begins in 1847.
- 5 October 1846: Harrisburg reconnected to service to Lancaster, and thus now to Philadelphia as well.
- 19 December 1846: Line in the Province of Canada, from Toronto to Hamilton (about 40 miles) opens.
- 29 December 1846: Line from Harrisburg to Pittsburgh, Pennsylvania is reached on December 26 and goes into service on December 29.

==== 1847 ====
- January 1847: The New York Evening Express uses the new Albany-New York telegraph line to beat the pony express of New York Herald to press.
- 14 January 1847: Toronto line is extended to Buffalo, New York.
- March 1847: Morse's Magnetic Telegraph Company buys the Baltimore-Washington telegraph line from the U.S. Government.
- By April 1847: Boston line extended to Portland, Maine.
- 21 April 1847: Service to Fredericksburg, Virginia from Washington is established.
- 10 May 1847: New line from Philadelphia opens to Reading, Pennsylvania.
- 17 May 1847: Line from Reading, Pennsylvania reaches Pottsville, Pennsylvania, the intended ending point of this new line.
- 8 July 1847: Telegraph station opened at Wheeling, West Virginia (then Virginia).
- 25 July 1847: Richmond, Virginia reached from Washington, D.C. line.
- 3 August 1847: Toronto line extended to Montreal by the Montreal Telegraph Company (which had hired Orrin S. Wood).
- 5 August 1847: Station opened at Zanesville, Ohio.
- 11 August 1847: Station opened at Columbus, Ohio.
- 20 August 1847: Eastern line reaches Cincinnati, Ohio.
- August 1847: Line from Pittsburgh reaches Cleveland, Ohio.
- 4 September 1847: Leg from north reaches Petersburg, Virginia.
- 17 September 1847: First transmission to Dayton, Ohio.
- 29 September 1847: Station opened at Madison, Indiana.
- 2 October 1847: Toronto-Montreal line opens line to Quebec City.
- 12 October 1847: Line to Binghamton, New York put into service.
- 26 November 1847: Line leg between Vincennes, Indiana and Louisville, Kentucky opens.
- 29 November 1847: Line completed from Detroit, Michigan to Ypsilanti, Michigan.
- 1 December 1847: On Southern project, line segment between Charleston, South Carolina and Columbia, South Carolina opens.
- 6 December 1847: Line from east has reached Vincennes, Indiana.
- 20 December 1847: Line operations from east reach East St. Louis, Illinois.
- 25 December 1847: Michigan line reaches Ann Arbor, Michigan.

==== 1848 ====
- 1 January 1848: O'Reilly Line reaches Erie, Pennsylvania.
- 15 January 1848 Line opens from Chicago, Illinois to Milwaukee, Wisconsin.
- 21 January 1848: Fayetteville, North Carolina to Cheraw, South Carolina leg operational.
- 28 January 1848: Chicago line extended east to Michigan City, Indiana.
- 2 February 1848: Line from Troy, New York opens through Burlington, Vermont. Line enters Vermont at Bennington and passes through Manchester, Rutland, Castleton, Whitehall, Orwell, Brandon, Middlebury, and Vergennes. It was soon after carried through to Montreal via St. Albans.
- 14 February 1848: Charleston, South Carolina connected to line from the North.
- 1 March 1848: Eastern lines reach Detroit, Michigan.
- March 1848: Line from East St. Louis, Illinois crosses Mississippi River to St. Louis, Missouri. Storm on 4 May 1848 topples one of the masts used to string wire across the river.
- 6 March 1848: Line extended to Nashville, Tennessee.
- 6 April 1848: Chicago line is attached to eastern line network via Detroit.
- 7 April 1848: Line from Nashville extended south to Tuscumbia, Alabama.
- 1 June 1848: Springfield, Illinois reached by wire.
- 18 July 1848: New Orleans reached with completion of link between Macon, Georgia and Montgomery, Alabama. Amos Kendall's completion of the line from Richmond, Wilmington, Charleston, Montgomery, Mobile, and New Orleans.
- 12 August 1848: Dubuque, Iowa reached.
- December 1848: Line from Portland, Maine extended through Belfast, Maine and Bangor, Maine. Belfast-to-Bangor leg opened on 23 November 1848.
- 28 December 1848: Leg between Calais, Maine and Saint John, New Brunswick (80 miles) is operational.

==== 1849 ====
- 20 January 1849: After many trials, the line from Baltimore to New York City is finally extended across the Hudson River at Jersey City.
- 13 February 1849: Line from Boston reaches Saint John, New Brunswick with completion of leg to Calais, Maine, and this spurs the start of the Nova Scotia Pony Express to take news from European steamers' first port of call in Halifax, Nova Scotia. The ship Europa that reached Halifax on February 21, 1849, was the first to carry news that used the pony express.
- 1 May 1849: Southern line at Macon, Georgia extended north to Atlanta, Georgia.
- 11 October 1849: Line reaches Norfolk, Virginia.
- 17 October 1849: Extension of Boston line to Sackville, New Brunswick used to transmit new Halifax news.
- 9 or 14? November 1849: Telegraph lines reach Halifax, Nova Scotia, ending the short-lived Nova Scotia Pony Express
- 15 November 1849: First steamer to arrive in Halifax from Europe has news telegraphed directly to New York.

==== 1850s ====
- 1850: About 12,000 miles of line from 20 companies now exist in the United States.
- 29 March 1850: Line reaches Danville, Virginia.
- 1851: The New York and Mississippi Valley Printing Telegraph Company, which later became Western Union, is organized in Rochester, New York.
- May 1851: Wilmington, North Carolina reached by line.

- 22 September 1853: First line in San Francisco opens between Lobos Hill and Telegraph Hill, superseding a four year old optical line.
- 26 October 1853: Service extended from San Francisco to San Jose, Stockton, Sacramento, and Marysville.
- January 1854: Service from Sacramento extended east to Mormon Island, California, Diamond Springs, California, and Nevada City, California.
- 14 February 1854: Marshall, Texas connected to Louisiana line.
- Later 1854: Houston, Texas, Galveston, Texas, and other Texas towns reached by telegraph line.
- 1855: Internal service within Oregon begins, with link between Portland, Oregon and Oregon City, Oregon.
- 1856: Service within Oregon extended south to Corvallis. Link to San Francisco not completed until 1864 (see timeline).
- 1856: In the far northeast, submarine cable is laid across the Cabot Strait from Aspy Bay in Nova Scotia to Cape Ray in Newfoundland. A land line from Cape Ray is also run to St. John's. This eventually led to news boats being stationed off Cape Race to get news from European steamers before they reached Halifax.
- 1856: The New York and Mississippi Valley Printing Telegraph Company merges with the Erie and Michigan Telegraph Company

=== Spread to continental and intercontinental service ===
- 1858

- 4 August 1858: Line from San Francisco opens north to Yreka, California (about 190 miles north from Marysville).
- 16 Aug 1858: The first transatlantic telegraph cable between North America and Europe starts operation, but fails after three weeks; a reliable new cable is not established until 1866.
- 30 August 1858: First service to Knoxville, Tennessee.
- October 1858: Line reaches La Crosse, Wisconsin.
- 29 November 1858: Line from Placerville, California east to Genoa, Nevada (then Utah Territory) completed by Frederick Bee.
- 20 December 1858: Line west to Kansas City, Missouri from Boonville, Missouri is completed.

- 1859

- Mid 1859: Western United States line reaches east to Carson City and to Virginia City by latter part of the year.
- 15 August 1859: Eastern lines reach Atchison, Kansas.

- 1860

- 3 April 1860 The Pony Express starts operations, running from St. Joseph, Missouri (where the rail and telegraph lines from the east ended) to San Francisco (Sacramento to San Francisco leg by steamer, rest by horse).
- 3 April 1860 Line starts operating from Springfield, Missouri to St. Louis, Missouri via Bolivar and Jefferson City. The line was later extended to Fayetteville, Arkansas and Ft. Smith, Arkansas. The road from St. Louis to Springfield to Ft. Smith was known as Telegraph Road or Wire Road, later Old Wire Road.
- 28 August 1860: Line from St. Joseph, Missouri, constructed by W.H. Stebbins, reaches Brownville, Nebraska, and communications commence the next day.
- 29 August 1860: Line reaches St. Paul, Minnesota.
- 1860: Nebraska line reaches Omaha, Nebraska.
- 8 October 1860: San Francisco-Sacramento line extended all the way to Los Angeles and starts service.
- Mid-October 1860: Western line is extended east to Fort Churchill. This is as far east as line reaches before work to finish transcontinental line start in July 1861.
- 31 October 1860: Nebraska line reaches west to Fort Kearny, Nebraska.
- 14 November 1860: Line opens in Minneapolis, Minnesota.

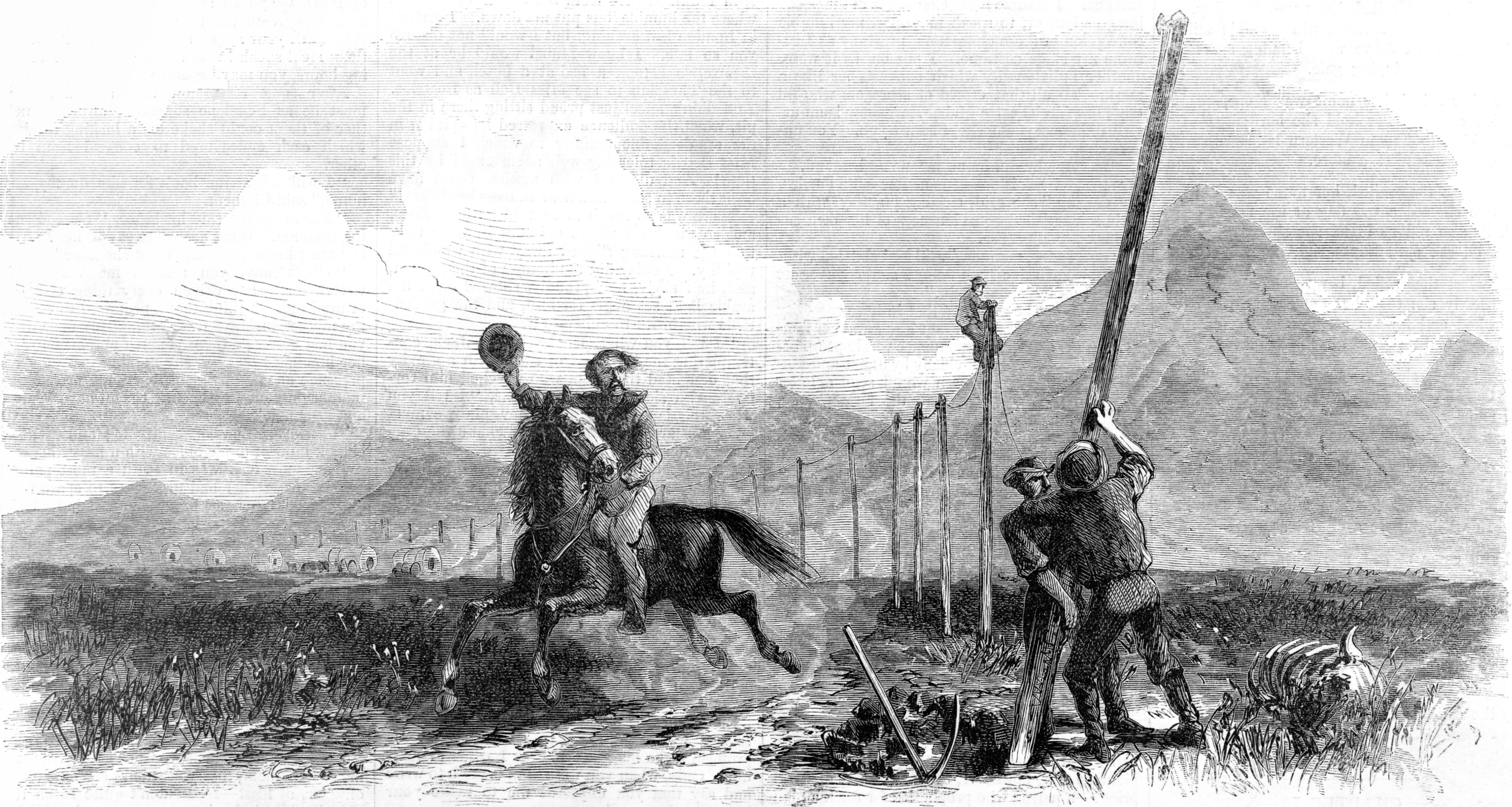
Depiction of the construction of the first Transcontinental Telegraph, with a Pony Express rider passing below.

- 1861

- March 1861: The Pony Express reduces its route from Salt Lake City, Utah to Sacramento, California.
- 4 July 1861: Work to complete the first transcontinental telegraph begins, with James Gamble in charges of the western crew starting in Nevada, and Edward Creighton heading the eastern crew.
- 20 July 1861: In the west, a California newspaper reports that line has now reached fifty miles east of Fort Churchill (in Nevada). The State Telegraph Company was sending one of their best operators to the eastern end so that news from the Pony Express could be immediately transmitted, and this plan would continue as the line advanced east. The portion of the line to be constructed west from Salt Lake City was starting to haul poles along the route and waiting arrival of wire from the East. In the East, the paper reported that wire should be up to Julesburg (now far northeast Colorado), two hundred miles west of Kearney, Nebraska by August 1.
- 25 July 1861: In west, transcontinental line reaches Middle Gate Station on the Pony Express line, 75 miles east of Fort Churchill.
- 5 August 1861: A team laying wire reaches Fort Laramie from the east.
- 21 August 1861: California newspaper reports that its latest news from the Pony Express came from the Willow telegraph station 50 miles west of Fort Kearney, and then traveled by horse to the Dry Creek station, 168 miles east of Fort Churchill. The total gap between ends of the line was now about 1,159 miles, not counting the unconnected section under construction from Salt Lake.
- 17 September 1861: In west, telegraph line is operational to Diamond Springs (Nevada) station on Pony Express. Messages from San Francisco can now reach New York in six days.
- 20 September 1861: Eastern line operational to a point 120 miles west of Fort Kearney.
- 28 September 1861: California newspaper reports that line from Fort Kearney, Nebraska has reached about 200 miles west to Julesburg. Another eastern work team has reached 300 miles east from Salt Lake City, only about 200 miles west of Julesburg. In the west, the line has been completed to Ruby Valley (now Nevada, then Utah Territory), somewhat over 200 miles to reach Salt Lake. (The distances reported in the article are not exact.) The total gap in telegraphic connection between west and east is now about 550 miles, which the Pony Express can normally cover in less than four days.
- 2 October 1861: Newspaper report shows eastern line now operating through Sweetwater Station (near Independence Rock in Wyoming).
- 17 October 1861: A link between line headed east from Salt Lake City is joined to the eastern line at Fort Bridger. Creighton telegraphs his wife "in a few days the two oceans will be united."
- 18 October 1861: Brigham Young sends first official telegraph message from Salt Lake City to the eastern United States. It is sent to Jeptha Wade, the president of the Pacific Telegraph Company. On the same day, Frank Fuller, acting governor of Utah, sent a message to President Lincoln.
- 24 October 1861: The first transcontinental telegraph across the United States is completed at Salt Lake City, Utah, causing the Pony Express to close two days later.

- 10 October 1863: Line opens to Denver, Colorado.
- March 1864: Service from San Francisco reaches north to Portland, Oregon.
- 25 October 1864: Service reaches north to Seattle, Washington.
- 1865: International Telecommunication Union is formed
- 18 July 1866: A new transatlantic telegraph cable between North America and Europe is successfully completed.
- 1870: Telegraph lines from Britain are connected to India.
- 20 November 1871: Service to Winnipeg opens.
- 1871: Practical duplex telegraphy system, allowing two messages to be sent over wire at the same time, one in each direction.
- 1872: Dallas, Texas reached by telegraph line.
- October 1872: Australia is linked to the world system by a submarine telegraph line between Darwin and the Dutch East Indies (Indonesia).
- 1874: Thomas Edison sells his invention of quadruplex telegraph to Western Union for $10,000. It allows a total of four separate signals to be transmitted and received on a single wire at the same time (two signals in each direction.)
- October 1902: The first trans-Pacific line links Brisbane, Australia to Vancouver, Canada (via Fiji and Norfolk Island).

=== End of telegraph era ===
- 27 January 2006: Western Union discontinues telegram services. Indian company BSNL continues telegraphic service into 2013.

== See also ==
- Electrical telegraph
