= High Street Historic District (Camden, Maine) =

Historic district in Maine, United States

- U.S. National Register of Historic Places
- U.S. Historic district
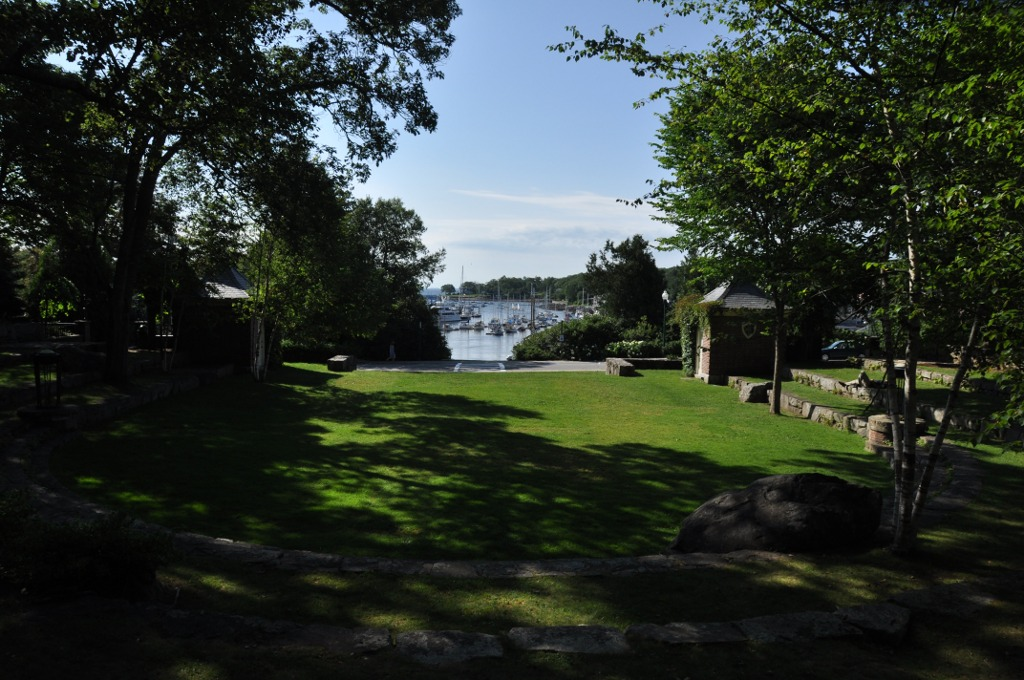
- The Amphiteater

- Location within Maine Location within the United States
- Location: Roughly High St. between Main St. and Sherman Point Rd., Camden, Maine
- Coordinates: 44°12′58″N 69°3′40″W
- Area: 65 acres (26 ha)
- Built: 1929
- Architect: Parker Morse Hooper & Charles Greely Loring (Camden Public Library)
- Architectural style: Queen Anne, Shingle Style, Federal
- NRHP reference No.: 88001843 (original); 99001186 (increase)

Significant dates
- Added to NRHP: January 5, 1989
- Boundary increase: September 24, 1999

The High Street Historic District encompasses a well-preserved 19th-century residential area of Camden, Maine. Extending along High Street (United States Route 1), the district has maintained its character since the 1920s, despite encroaching commercialization of nearby areas, and retains a cross-section of architecture of the 19th and early 20th centuries. It was listed on the National Register of Historic Places in 1989, and enlarged in 1999 to include the Olmsted Brothers-designed Harbor Park at Main and Atlantic.

== Description and history ==
The town of Camden is located on the west side of Penobscot Bay in the Mid Coast area of Maine. Its town center is at the mouth of the Megunticook River, where the first English settlers established mills in 1771. The town was incorporated in 1791, and grew in the 19th century as a shipping and shipbuilding port. United States Route 1 is the primary road through the community, passing through the commercial center at the river and continuing north toward Belfast. The area immediately north of the river was initially farmland, but was developed over time as the town's economy grew over the course of the 19th century, transitioning from a fishing and shipbuilding community, to one that is based mainly on tourism.

The High Street district begins at the junction of Main and Atlantic Streets, abutting the Camden Great Fire Historic District, which encompasses the town's commercial area. Its southernmost properties are the Harbor Park and the 1929 Camden Public Library and adjacent landscaped amphitheater, the latter two a National Historic Landmark for the landscape work by Fletcher Steele. The park, designed by the Olmsted Brothers, was developed in the 1930s, and retains its original path layout and other features. From the library, the district extends north along Main and High Streets as far as Marine Drive, including houses that once served as farmhouses early in the 19th century, and the elaborate Queen Anne Norumbega Castle and Carriage House (the latter now a separate residence).

== See also ==
- National Register of Historic Places listings in Knox County, Maine
