= Arthur Jennings =

Arthur Jennings may refer to:

- Arthur Bates Jennings (1850–1927), American architect
- Arthur Jennings (rugby union) (born 1940), Fijian-born New Zealand rugby union player
