= Julius Wilhelm Gintl =

Austrian physicist

Julius Wilhelm Gintl (November 12, 1804 – December 22, 1883) was an Austrian physicist.

== Biography ==
Gintl was born in 1804 in Prague and attended university in his hometown. He was chair of physics at Vienna University and later at Gratz. In 1847, the Austrian government commissioned him to manage the introduction of the electrical telegraph.

In 1853, Gintl developed an early form of duplex electrical telegraph, which allowed two messages to be transmitted on a single wire in opposite directions. This duplex communication was an early specific case of the general practice of multiplexing. While Gintl's technology was not commercial successful, his method was improved upon by German engineer Carl Frischen and later by J. B. Stearns, who would patent a version in 1872. Edison, who was also working on the design, would further refine his method in his implementation of a quadruplex telegraph.

Gintl was a member of Vienna's Academy of Arts and Sciences by 1849. In 1863, he became a member of the Society of Arts in London.
