= Norumbega Carriage House =

- U.S. National Register of Historic Places
- Location within Maine Location within the United States
- Location: High St., Camden, Maine
- Coordinates: 44°13′0″N 69°3′25″W
- Area: 0.3 acres (0.12 ha)
- Built: 1886
- Architect: Arthur Bates Jennings
- Architectural style: Queen Anne
- NRHP reference No.: 82000766
- Added to NRHP: February 19, 1982

The Norumbega Carriage House is a historic house on High Street in Camden, Maine. Built in 1886 as the carriage house for the adjacent Norumbega Castle of Joseph B. Stearns, it is now a private residence. It was designed by Norumbega's architect, Arthur Bates Jennings, and is (along with the main house) one of Camden's finest and most unusual examples of Queen Anne architecture. It was listed on the National Register of Historic Places in 1982.

== Description and history ==
The former Norumbega Carriage House stands southeast of Norumbega Castle (now the Norumbega Inn), and is accessed via either High Street (from a drive shared in part with Norumbega) or Marine Drive. It is a 2 1/2-story structure, built out of fieldstone and frame construction finished in wooden shingles. Its main block is rectangular, with a cross-gabled roof, and a tall circular tower at its eastern corner. The bottom half of the tower is stone, while the upper part of frame, and it is topped by a conical roof. The main facade faces northwest, and has an off-center stone section rising to a wall dormer at the roof level. In its ground level is a large entry set in a segmented-arch opening, with an arched bay above. A square ell extends southwest from the main block, giving the building an L shape.

The carriage house was built, along with the main house, in 1886 for Joseph Barker Stearns, a telecommunications magnate who made his fortune in developing and patenting the duplex telegraph. It was designed by New York City architect Arthur Bates Jennings, whose credits in Maine also include the St. Lawrence Church in Portland. The carriage house has for many years been under separate ownership from the main house, and has been adapted to residential use.

== See also ==
- National Register of Historic Places listings in Knox County, Maine
