= Arthur Bates Jennings =

American architect

- Born: April 30, 1847; North Brookfield, Massachusetts
- Died: March 30, 1927 (aged 79); New York City
- Occupation: Architect

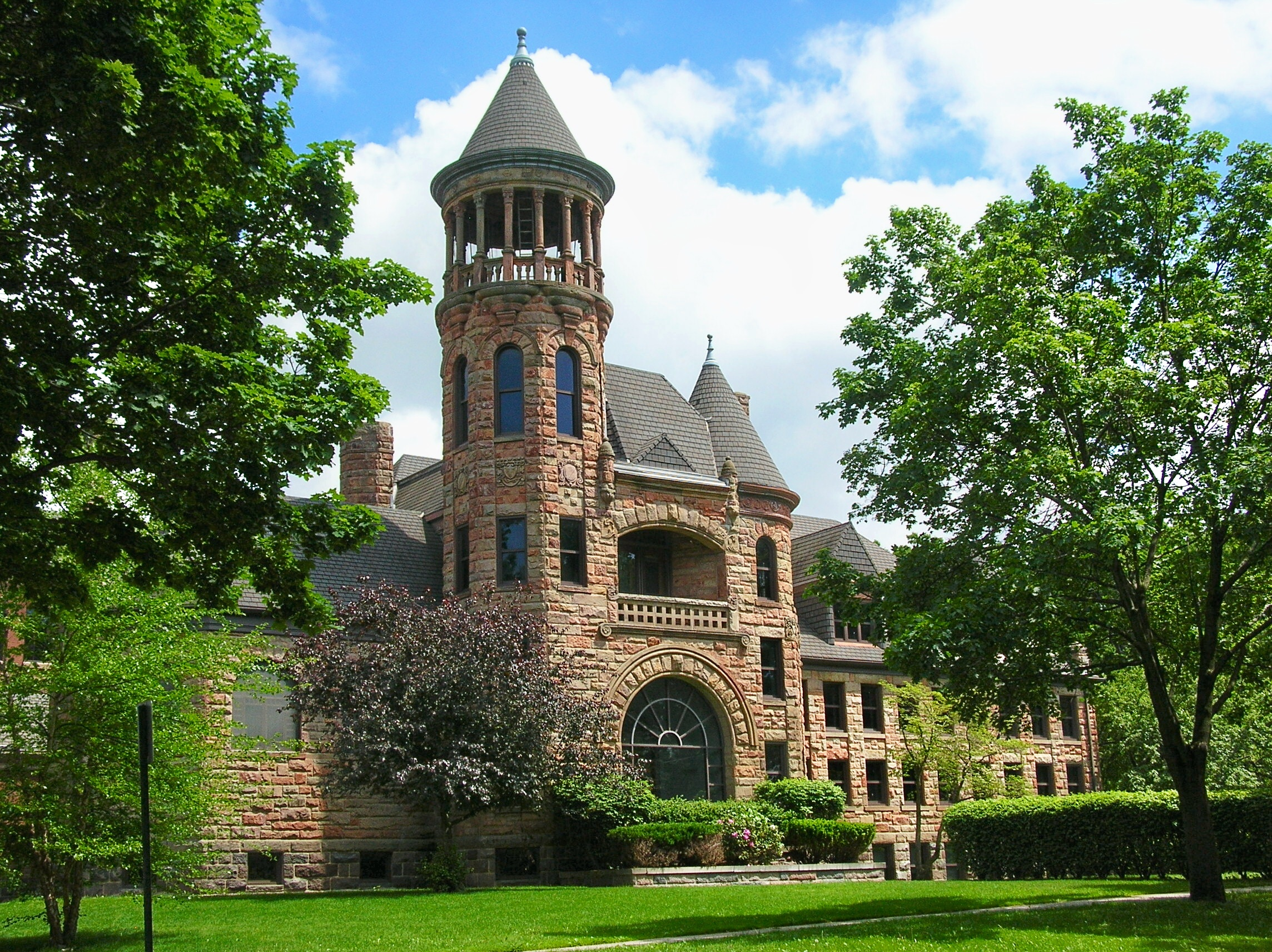
Burrage Library of Olivet College in Michigan, designed by Jennings and completed in 1890.

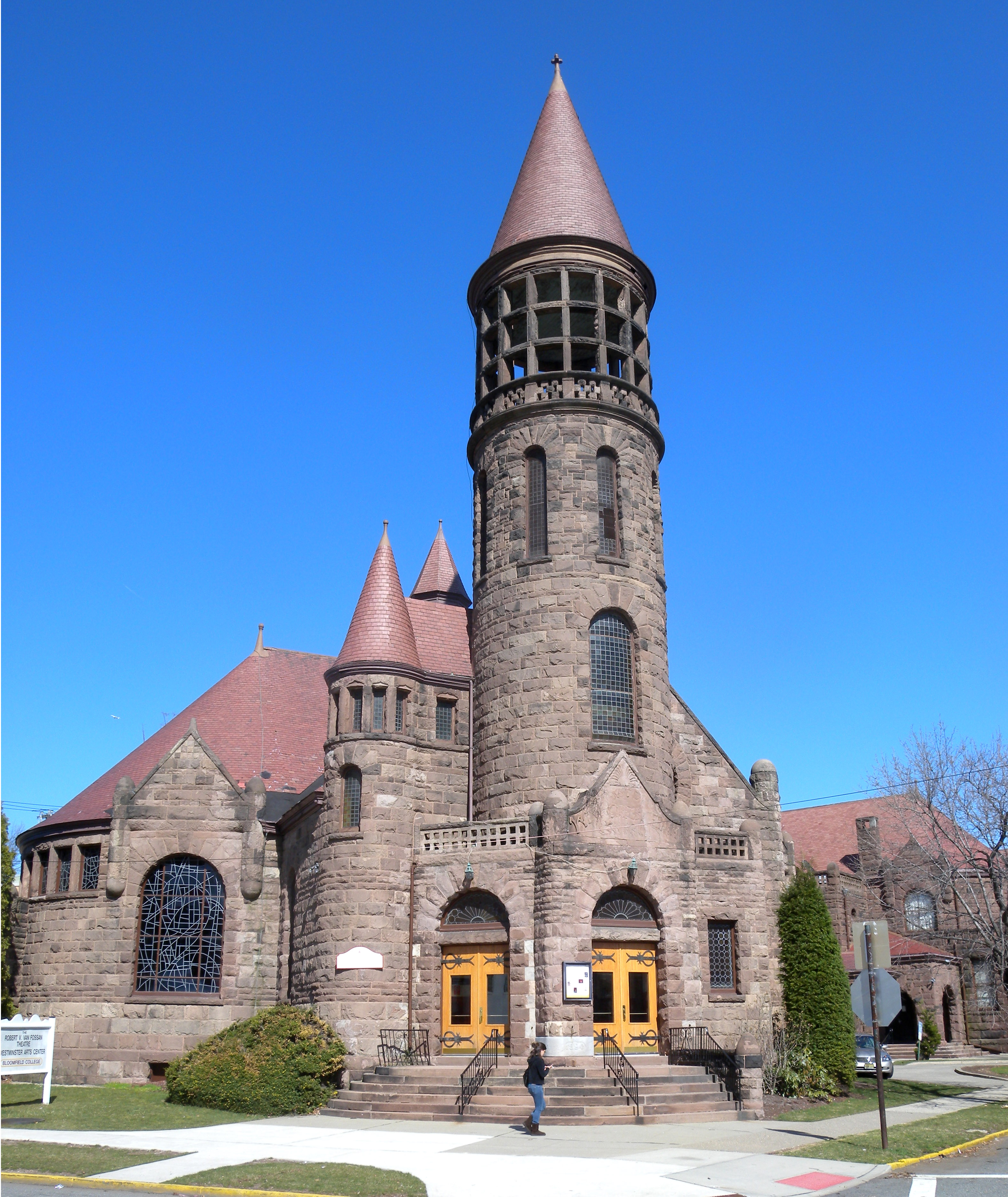
The former Westminster Presbyterian Church in Bloomfield, New Jersey, completed in 1892.

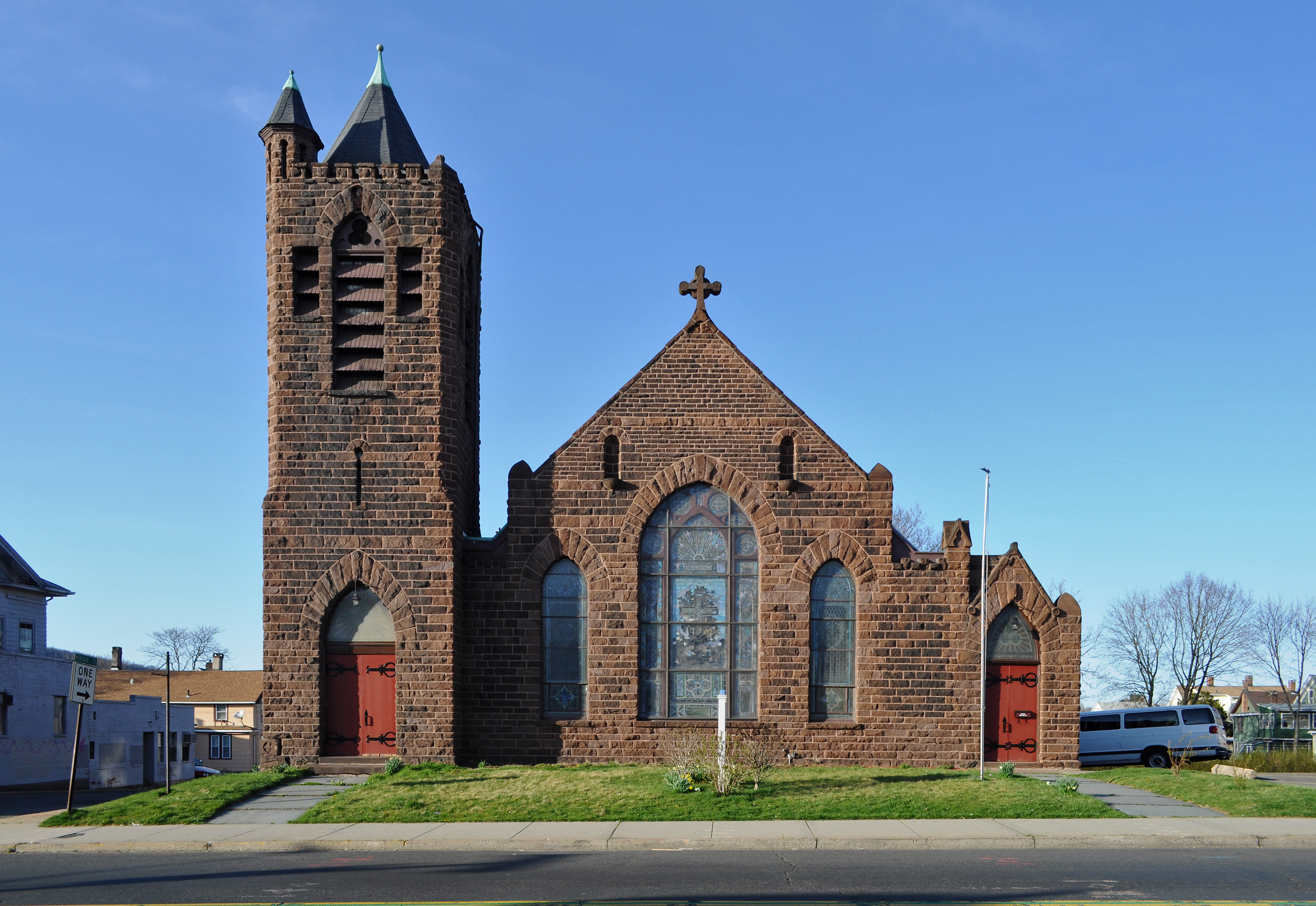
The All Saints Memorial Episcopal Church in Meriden, Connecticut, completed in 1893.

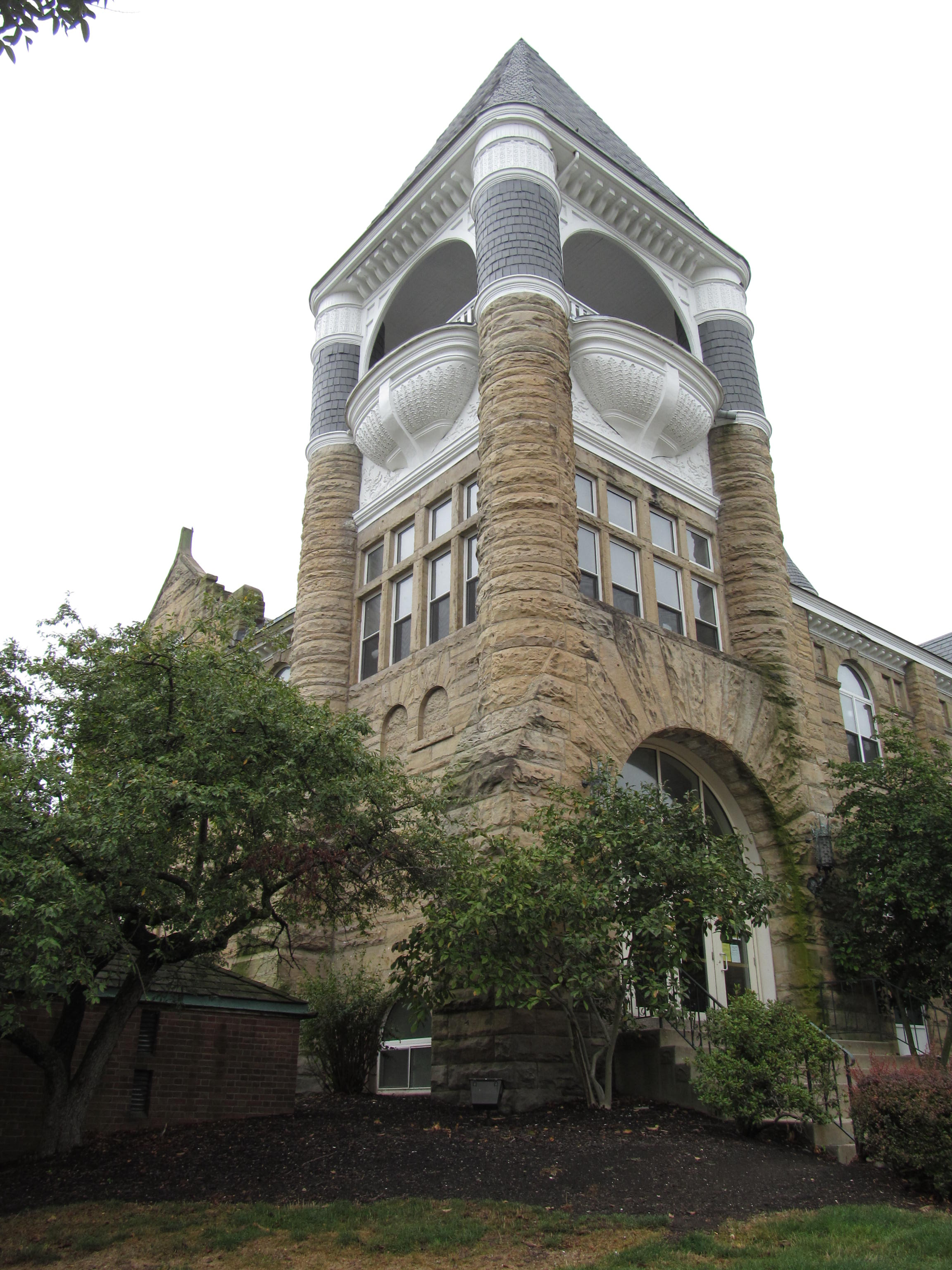
The Old Gym of Washington & Jefferson College in Pennsylvania, completed in 1893.

The Second Congregational Church in Winsted, Connecticut, completed in 1899.

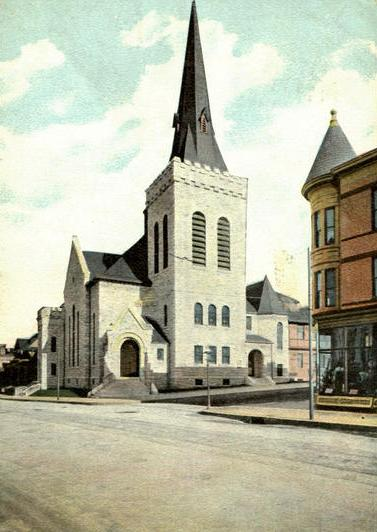
The former Salem Baptist Church in New Rochelle, New York, completed in 1904 and burned in 2011.

Arthur Bates Jennings FAIA (April 30, 1849 – March 30, 1927) was an American architect in practice in New York City from c. 1876 to 1919.

== Life and career ==
Arthur Bates Jennings was born April 30, 1849, in North Brookfield, Massachusetts, to Joel Albert Jennings, a lawyer, and Susan Frances (Bates) Jennings. He earned an A.B. from the College of the City of New York in 1870 and received architectural training in the offices of John Correja, George B. Post and Russell Sturgis. He opened his own office c. 1876, and initially worked on suburban developments in New Jersey for Stewart Hartshorn and others. He later became well-known as an architect of public buildings, including churches and college buildings.

Jennings's buildings followed popular styles, and frequently utilized multiple towers and bold ornament. They were constructed across the United States, from Portland, Maine, to Seattle, and at least as far south as Hot Springs, Arkansas. He retired from practice in 1919.

Jennings became a Fellow of the American Institute of Architects in 1890.

== Personal life ==
Jennings was married in 1881 Caroline Jerusha Allen of Meriden, Connecticut, and had three children: Edward Allen, Arthur Bates Jr. and Helen Bates. He died March 30, 1927, in New York City at the age of 79.

== Legacy ==
At least five buildings designed by Jennings have been listed on the United States National Register of Historic Places, though one has been substantially demolished.

== Works ==
=== In New York City ===
- James V. S. Woolley houses, 115-121 E 91st St, Manhattan (1876–77)
- Lucien C. Warner house, 2042 5th Ave, Manhattan (1883, demolished)
- Charles L. Guillaume houses, 133-145 W 87th St, Manhattan (1884)
- Stephen F. Sherman house, 410 Riverside Dr, Manhattan (1884, demolished 1906) - Better known as the residence of George Noakes.
- Joseph J. Kittell house, 495 Riverside Dr, Manhattan (1885, demolished)
- David S. Brown houses, 170-176 W 72nd St, Manhattan (1886) - Built by Brown and various family members. No. 174, the only survivor, was occupied by Albert S. Roe. No. 172 was occupied by Jacob A. Chamberlain.
- E. August Neresheimer house, 176 Malcolm X Blvd, Manhattan (1886, demolished 1901)
- John J. Gibbons house, 494 Riverside Dr, Manhattan (1887, demolished)
- Christian Blinn house, 3 W 81st St, Manhattan (1888, demolished)
- George Daiker houses, 718-730 St Nicholas Ave, Manhattan (1889–90)
- J. C. Desuris house, 607 W 113th St, Manhattan (1889, demolished 1910)
- Webb Institute, Fordham Hill Oval, the Bronx (1890–93, demolished)
- George E. Clay house, 21-49 45th Rd, Queens (1891)
- Hanover Fire Insurance Company Building, 34 Pine St, Manhattan (1893–94, demolished)
- Bay Ridge Reformed Church, 8101 Ridge Blvd, Brooklyn (1896–97)
- Bedford Presbyterian Church, 1200 Dean St, Brooklyn (1897)

=== In the New York metropolitan area ===
- John P. Allen house, 66 New England Ave, Summit, New Jersey (1881, demolished)
- Joseph T. Low house, 76 Rumson Rd, Rumson, New Jersey (1885, demolished)
- S. Bayard Dod house, 302 S Harrison St, East Orange, New Jersey (1885, demolished 1941)
- Westminster Presbyterian Church, 449 Franklin St, Bloomfield, New Jersey (1890–92) - Now the Westminster Arts Center of Bloomfield College.
- Summit Library, 10 New England Ave, Summit, New Jersey (1891, NRHP 2009)
- All Saints Memorial Episcopal Church, 201 W Main St, Meriden, Connecticut (1892–93)
- First Reformed Church, Clinton and Johnson Aves, Newark, New Jersey (1898, demolished)
- Second Congregational Church, 800 Main St, Winsted, Connecticut (1898–99)
- First Congregational Church, 95 N Main St, Winsted, Connecticut (1900–01)
- Salem Baptist Church, 438 Main St, New Rochelle, New York (1904, burned 2011)

=== Elsewhere ===
- Warner Hall, Oberlin College, Oberlin, Ohio (1884, demolished)
- Norumbega Castle, 63 High St, Camden, Maine (1886–87, NRHP 1974)
- Norumbega Carriage House, High St, Camden, Maine (1886, NRHP 1982)
- Denny Hotel, 3rd Ave and Virginia St, Seattle (1888–93, demolished 1906) - Construction resumed and completed in 1903 as the Washington Hotel. Demolished when Denny Hill was leveled.
- Burrage Library, Olivet College, Olivet, Michigan (1889–90)
- First Baptist Church, 212 S Lincoln St, Spokane, Washington (1890, demolished)
- Old Gym, Washington & Jefferson College, Washington, Pennsylvania (1892–93)
- St. Timothy's Protestant Episcopal Church, 226 SE 3rd St, Massillon, Ohio (1892, NRHP 1979)
- Cranston Street Baptist Church, 475 Cranston St, Providence, Rhode Island (1893)
- First Baptist Church, 202 Milton Ave, Ballston Spa, New York (1896)
- Penn Yan M. E. Church, 166 Main St, Penn Yan, New York (1897–99)
- St. Lawrence Congregational Church, 76 Congress St, Portland, Maine (1897, NRHP 1979, demolished 2008) - Parish house extant.
- Grace Street Baptist Church, Grace and Foushee Sts, Richmond, Virginia (1898, burned)
- New England Congregational Church, 125 Circular St, Saratoga Springs, New York (1900)
- First Baptist Church, 301 S Pittsburgh St, Connellsville, Pennsylvania (1901–03)
- First Reformed Church, 23 Kinderhook St, Chatham, New York (1901)
- First Baptist Church, E Jefferson St and 2nd St NE, Charlottesville, Virginia (1904, burned)
- Central M. E. Church, Central Ave and Chapel St, Hot Springs, Arkansas (1908, burned)
- First Baptist Church, 229 N King St, Hampton, Virginia (1909, burned 1914)
- First Baptist Church, Westover and Moran Aves, Norfolk, Virginia (1909–10, burned)
- Rice Memorial Hall, Oberlin College, Oberlin, Ohio (1909–10, altered)
- First M. E. Church, 17 E 6th St, Dunkirk, New York (1916)
