= Orrin S. Wood =

Orrin Squire Wood (December 14, 1817 – June 22, 1909) was one of the early pioneers of the telegraph industry in the United States and Canada.

The brother-in-law of Ezra Cornell, who assisted Samuel Morse in construction of the Baltimore-Washington telegraph line, Wood was recruited in August 1844 to be a telegraph operator on the line and was Morse's first pupil. He was one of the founders of the Magnetic Telegraph Company with Cornell, Morse, and others, in 1845. He helped set up a telegraph exhibition in lower Manhattan in New York and built a one-mile line for demonstration at the 1845 New York State Fair in Utica, New York. He also oversaw the building of the line between Albany, New York, and Utica which opened in early 1846, the beginning of the rapid expansion of the telegraph in North America. He then opened the first commercial telegraph office in New York City in the fall of 1846. In 1847, he was recruited to be president of the newly formed Montreal Telegraph Company, which rapidly established lines to Toronto and, Quebec City, and then New York in August 1847. He remained with that company until 1866 and substantially retired following a few years of additional work in the Wisconsin area. Duggan House, a mansion in Montreal now owned by McGill University, was built for Wood in 1861.

Wood was born in Sherburne, New York on December 14, 1817, and died in Turner, New York at age 91 on June 22, 1909. Having long outlived Morse, Alfred Vail, and Cornell, he was noted to be the "oldest living telegrapher" in his final years.
