= Victoria Beach =

Victoria Beach may refer to

- Rural Municipality of Victoria Beach, a municipality in Manitoba
- Victoria Beach, Nova Scotia
