= Norman Lee Swartout =

American playwright

Norman Lee Swartout, Sr.
- Born: April 17, 1879; Auburn, New York
- Died: November 30, 1930 (aged 51); Summit, New Jersey
- Education: University of Rochester
- Occupation: Playwright
- Known for: The Arrival of Kitty
- Spouse: Helen Louise Briggs
- Children: Norman Lee Swartout, Jr. Barbara Swartout

Signature
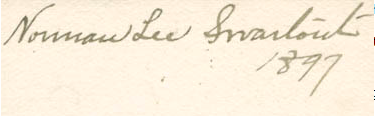

Norman Lee Swartout Sr. (April 17, 1879 - October 30, 1930) was an American playwright. He was the editor and manager of the play department for Longman, Green & Co. He became the director of the Summit Playhouse in 1918.

== Biography ==
He was born in Auburn, New York, on April 17, 1879. He attended the University of Rochester where he was a member of the Alpha Delta Phi fraternity and graduated around 1901. He made his stage debut Don Caesar's Return with James Keteltas Hackett at Wallack's Theatre in Manhattan. He wrote the farcical play The Arrival of Kitty in 1906.

He married Helen Louise Briggs around 1912. They had two children: Norman Lee Swartout Jr. (born 1914) who married Hildegarde Spindler; and Barbara Swartout.

He became the director of the Summit Playhouse in 1918.

He died on October 30, 1930, in Summit, New Jersey, he was 51 years old.

== Plays ==
- The Toastmaster
- Half Back Sandy
- One of the Eight
- The Arrival of Kitty (1906)
- One of The: A College Comedy in Four Acts (1908)
- Every Man For Himself
- Close to Nature: A Farcical Episode in the Life of an American Family, in Four Acts (1915)
