= Pony express (newspapers) =

Former American newspaper practice

In newspapers, a pony express were express delivery systems that newspapers used in the 19th century to obtain news faster or publish it prior to rival publications. As with the celebrated Pony Express of 1860–61, these systems were eventually supplanted by telegraph lines.

== Pony express systems ==
In December 1830, three New York concerns competed to be the first to publish President Andrew Jackson's annual message to Congress -- The Journal of Commerce, the New York Courier and Enquirer, and the Association of Morning Papers. James Gordon Bennett of the Courier and Enquirer arranged for a horseback express from Washington to Baltimore, followed by a ship to Philadelphia and second horseback leg to New York City. The run took six hours and cost almost $300, but the Courier and Enquirer prevailed over its competitors.

The Journal of Commerce initiated a regular eight-relay express from Philadelphia to New York in January 1833. After its rivals sought federal government's help through the establishment of an express government delivery system, the Journal expanded its line directly to Washington, D.C., giving it a news advantage of one to three days.

== The telegraph defeats the horse ==
By the 1840s, the New York Herald (founded by Bennett in 1835) had developed an express route from Albany, New York (the capital of the state of New York) to New York City. Bennett knew that telegraph lines were being built, but had rebuffed attempts to sell him on its merits, as he favored his established methods and the advantage it gave him over his competition. But in January 1847, the New York Evening Express accepted the offer of Ezra Cornell to use his new telegraph line from Albany to New York to get legislative news, and the Express was able to publish a new message from the governor in advance of the Herald pony express line. Beaten badly to press, the Herald was forced to abandon its opposition to the telegraph.

Pony express systems, however, continued to be developed when and where telegraph lines did not exist, though the systems would always dissolve once telegraph lines went into service. Thus, in 1846, during the Mexican–American War, the Baltimore Sun and Philadelphia Public Ledger established a sixty-pony express route to New Orleans. This provided Americans with their first taste of close to real-time coverage of warfare. And in 1861, The Oregonian newspaper organized a pony express and stagecoach replay to obtain dispatches and Civil War news days ahead of rival papers in Portland, Oregon, who relied on reports to arrive by steamer from San Francisco.

== Nova Scotia Pony Express (1849) ==
Getting news from Europe fostered a Pony Express service across Nova Scotia. In February 1849, the Associated Press financed this relay service to carry the latest European news to New York newspapers. Ships would arrive in Halifax from Europe, carrying news that would then travel by Pony Express across Nova Scotia from Halifax to Digby Gut, where it would travel again by ship across the Bay of Fundy to the nearest telegraph station at Saint John, New Brunswick. There, news was transmitted to other East Coast cities by telegraph. The trip covered some 146 miles in as little as eight hours, with mount changes along the route and a rider change at Kentville. Once the telegraph line reached Halifax in November 1849, the express was ended. After that, competition for European news focused on trying to send news from ships to the telegraph faster, such as the express newsboat which the Associated Press operated from Cape Race in Newfoundland from 1859–66, which ceased after reliable transatlantic telegraph cable service was established. The Pony Express was designated a National Historic Event in 1950, and a federal plaque was erected at its western terminus at Victoria Beach on the Digby Gut.
