= Quadruplex telegraph =

Type of electrical telegraph

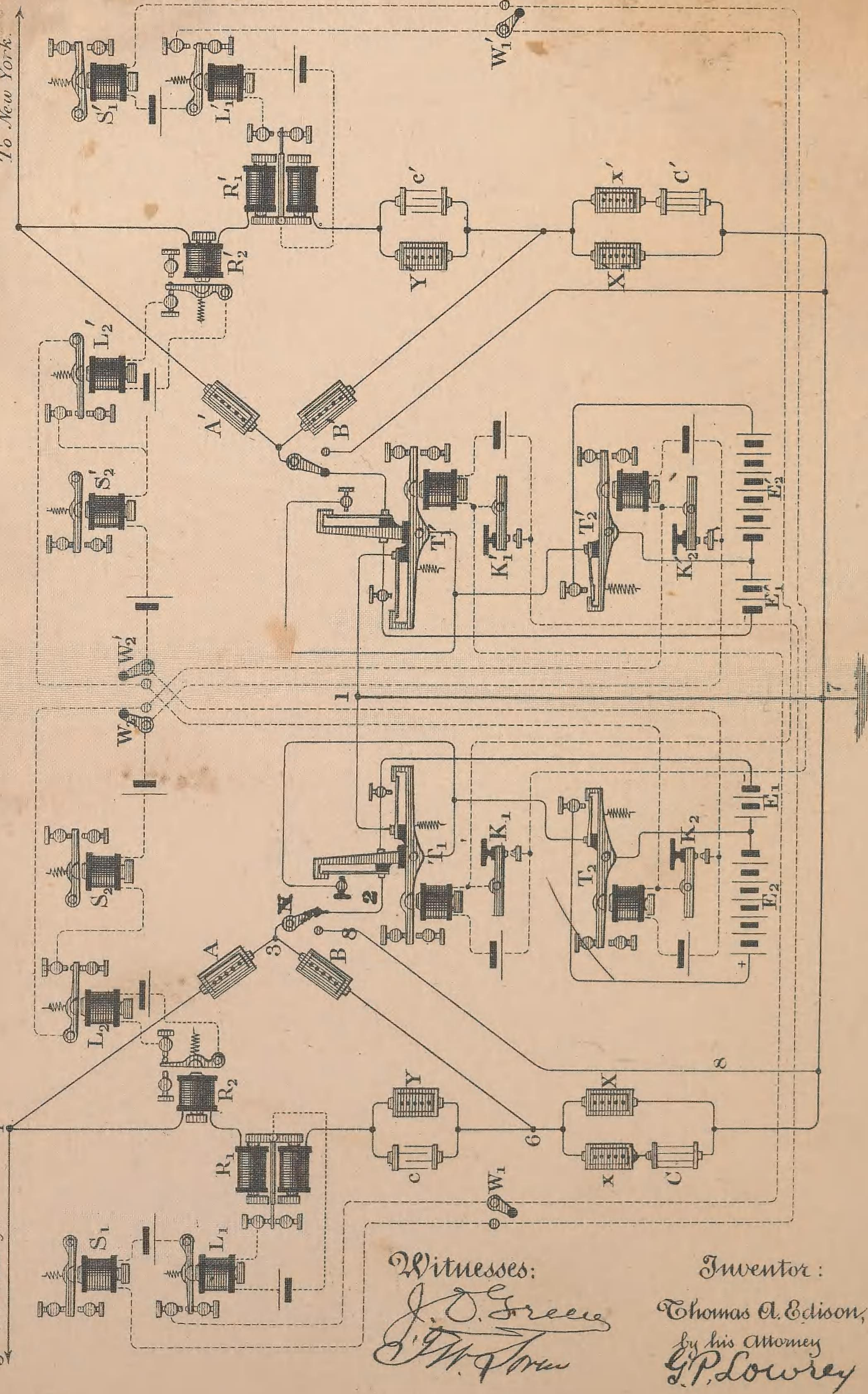
Patent drawing of Edison's Quadruplex

The Quadruplex telegraph is a type of electrical telegraph which allows a total of four separate signals to be transmitted and received on a single wire at the same time (two signals in each direction). Quadruplex telegraphy thus implements a form of multiplexing.

The technology was invented by Thomas Edison, who sold the rights to Jay Gould, the owner of the Atlantic and Pacific Telegraph Company, in 1874 for the sum of $30,000 (equivalent to $854,000 in 2025). Edison had previously been turned down by Western Union for the sale of the Quadruplex. This proved to be a grave mistake. Jay Gould used the Quadruplex to wage price wars on Western Union and to short its stock. Cornelius Vanderbilt was Western Union's largest shareholder and caught the brunt of Jay Gould's move. Vanderbilt died during the saga, which left his son William in charge. William Vanderbilt, much like his father, was no match for Jay Gould and quickly buckled. To stop the rate war Western Union bought Atlantic Pacific (and the rights to the Quadruplex from Jay Gould) for $5 million (equivalent to $142,000,000 in 2025).

The problem of sending two signals simultaneously in opposite directions on the same wire had been solved previously by Julius Wilhelm Gintl and improved to commercial viability by J. B. Stearns; Edison added the ability to double the number in each direction.

The method combined a diplex (multiplex two signals in the same direction), which Edison had previously invented, with a Stearns style Duplex (simultaneous bi-directional communication). In each case, a clever trick is used.

Since telegraphs use a single wire, the current must flow through the signal (noise producing) relay at both ends (local and remote). In the Duplex, the challenge is simply not to have the local signal relay clack when the key is pressed, but to clack when the remote is pressed. This is achieved by dividing the relay into two solenoid windings and feeding the local key's energizing voltage into the midpoint of these. Thus when the local key is pressed, the current divides equally in two directions. One of these goes through a relay coil, then into a matched termination load. The matched termination load and relay coil are matched to an identical setup at the receiving end, to keep the current between the two solenoid coils as even as possible. The other half of the current is sent down the wire to the remote relay (which often switches the remote signal relay) and its termination load. Since the current flowing into this Y-shaped junction between the solenoids flows in opposite directions in the two local solenoids they sum to no net magnetic field, and the local relay is not activated. At the remote end, the sent current flows through both solenoids in the same direction and into the termination load. Since current flows the same way in both solenoids the remote signal relay is activated by this local key.

For the Diplex, a different trick is used. To send two messages simultaneously, one has two independent local telegraph keys. These are arranged so the battery is reversed in polarity on one of these. First note the challenge to overcome: the duplex solenoid as described above would not resolve which way the current is flowing. While the solenoid's magnetic field would be in the opposite direction, the induced ferromagnet in the iron bar would be attracted either way, closing the signal relay regardless of the current flow direction. The solution is to replace the iron with a permanent magnet, and the relay switch is replaced with a double pole switch. Now the permanent magnet senses the field direction and is pushed or pulled. When the permanent magnet north is repelled, the switch closes to one pole, and when the permanent magnet south is repelled the switch closes to the other pole. To increase practicality, Edison found other additional relays were necessary to provide hysteresis that prevented the switch from being indeterminate or fluttering at the moment of current reversals, and to send the separated signal to the appropriate sound emitter.

== Innovations ==
While this is conceptually elementary to modern engineers, one has to appreciate that multiplexing was a patent-worthy breakthrough and a huge economic win for telegraphy, since most of the challenge and expense was in the long wires between stations. This sort of polarity-based diplexing is analogous to the modern so-called "Charlieplexing" often used in LED panels: there the diode nature of LEDs allows two different (red or green) LEDs connected to ground to be controlled with the same wire depending on the voltage polarity. Edison and Stearns were dealing with the limited electronic components of the day.

Stearn's innovation was to use a capacitor in the termination load. Without this, only short transmission distances were possible because the impedance mismatch of the reactive long wire would not balance the currents in the two halves of the local relay, activating it. This was innovative since impedance matching for transmission lines instead of a simple ohmic circuits was not appreciated initially. This was a significant technological advancement, as at the time capacitors were difficult to produce.

Edison's innovations were the use of a polarized permanent magnet relay (instead of the yet-to-be-invented diode) and the use of some ancillary relay logic to add a useful hysteresis to avoid the indeterminate current reversal states (avoiding the need for expensive capacitors). The method of combining the diplex and the duplex Edison developed enabled the Quadruplex.

== See also ==
- Polar modulation
- Phonograph
