= Norumbega Castle =

Historic house in Maine, United States

- Norumbega
- U.S. National Register of Historic Places
- U.S. Historic district – Contributing property
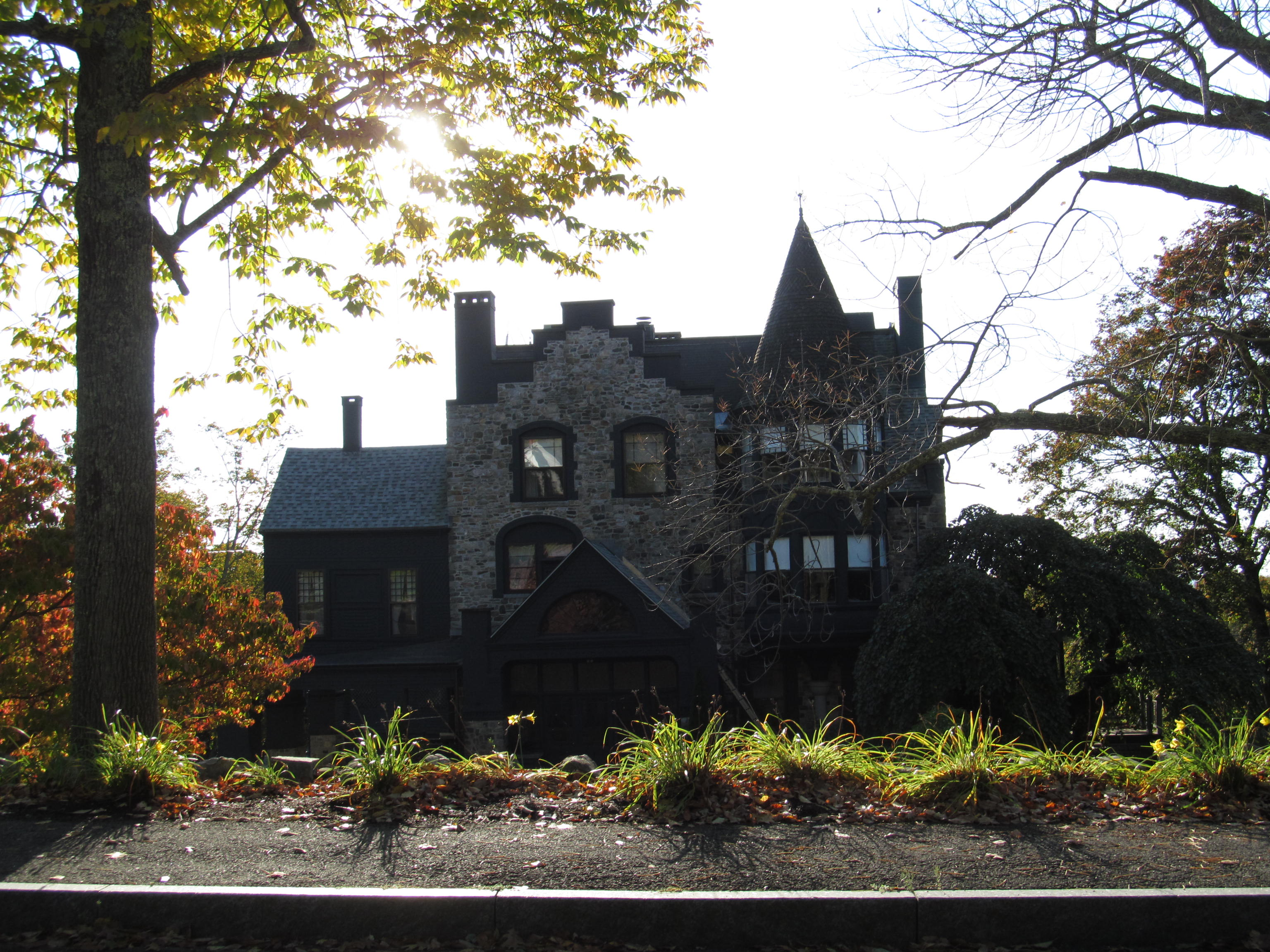

- Location within Maine Location within the United States
- Location: 63 High St., Camden, Maine
- Coordinates: 44°13′4″N 69°3′26″W
- Area: 1 acre (0.40 ha)
- Built: 1886
- Architect: Jennings, Arthur Bates
- Architectural style: Queen Anne
- Part of: High Street Historic District (ID88001843)
- NRHP reference No.: 74000174

Significant dates
- Added to NRHP: July 12, 1974
- Designated CP: January 5, 1989

Norumbega Castle is a historic house at 63 High Street in Camden, Maine. Built in 1886-87 for duplex telegraph inventor Joseph Barker Stearns, it is one of Mid Coast Maine's most elaborate 19th-century summer houses, exhibiting a sophisticated Queen Anne style in stone and wood. It now houses the Norumbega Inn, a bed and breakfast inn. It was listed on the National Register of Historic Places in 1974.

== Description and history ==
Norumbega Castle stands north of downtown Camden, on the southeast side of High Street (United States Route 1), beyond its junction with Marine Drive. It is a 2 1/2-story structure, finished in rusticated stone with brick and wooden trim. It is basically rectangular in shape, but its features are asymmetrically arranged, typical for the Queen Anne period. Its main facade has three sections. The center section rises three stories, and is topped by a stepped gable. The right section, also three stories, has a projecting section topped by a conical turret. The interior is elaborately finished, and featured the latest innovations in modern households of the period, including electric lights and steam heat.

Norumbega was designed by New York City architect Arthur B. Jennings, and built by a local contractor in 1886–87. It was built for Joseph Barker Stearns, a native of Weld, Maine, who made a fortune in the telegraph industry by patenting duplex telegraphy and licensing it worldwide. Jennings also designed the estate's carriage house, which is now in separate ownership, and is also listed on the National Register of Historic Places.

== See also ==
- National Register of Historic Places listings in Knox County, Maine
