= Montreal Telegraph Company =

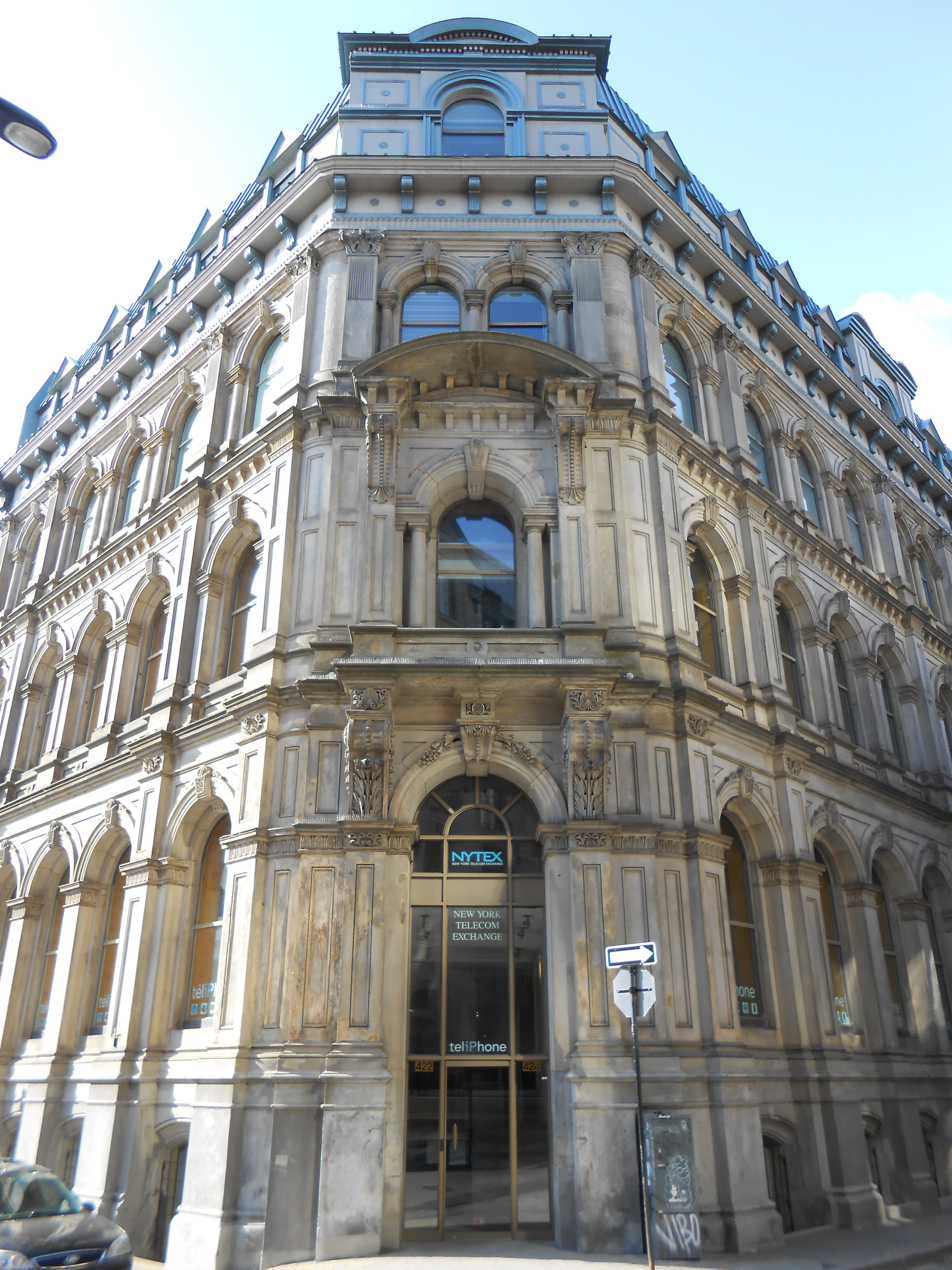
Montreal Telegraph building, 422-424, rue Saint-François-Xavier, Montreal

The Montreal Telegraph Company was the first significant telegraph company in Canada.

In 1847, early telegraph pioneer Orrin S. Wood was recruited to be president of the company, which rapidly established telegraph lines to Toronto and Quebec City from Montreal, and then New York by August 1847. The company's operations grew to 1,900 miles of line during the 1850s, and to 12,400 miles of line by 1870. Wood had technical expertise, but was not an established businessman in Canada, so Hugh Allan became president in 1852, and Wood continued as superintendent.

The creation of Dominion Telegraph Company in 1868 caused strong competition between the two companies, leading to a price war and decreased profits. Jay Gould's Great North Western Company merged with Dominion in 1881, clearly making the company its next target. Montreal yielded a 97-year lease of its lines to Great North Western in August 1881. After 1881, the company lost its dominant position, and was eventually integrated into Western Union.
