= Summit Free Public Library =

Coordinates: 40.7152°N 74.3603°W

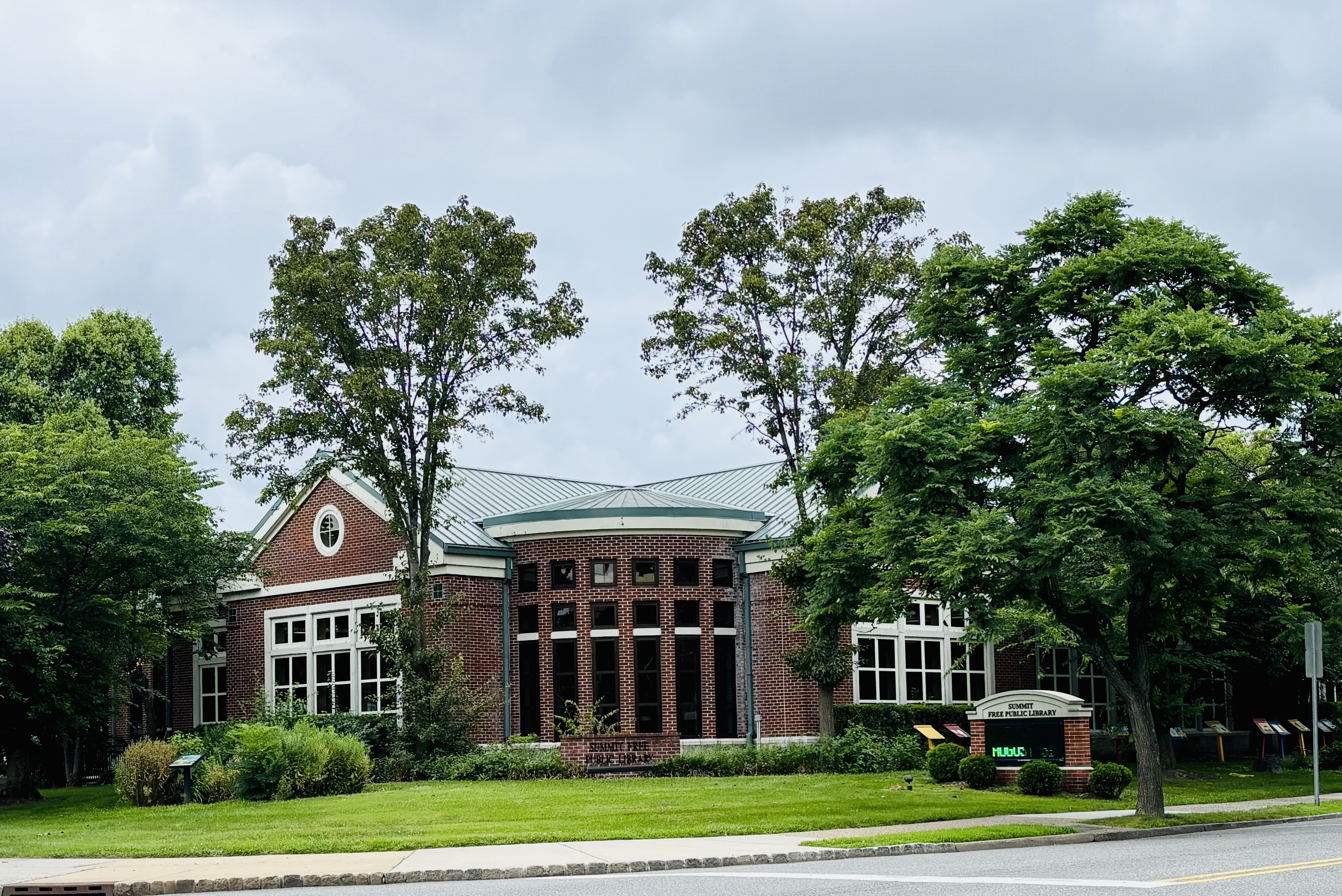
- Location: Summit, New Jersey, U.S.
- Established: 1911

Access and use
- Population served: 21,000 residents additional employees, visitors

Other information
- Director: Susan Permahos
- Employees: 49
- Website: website

The Summit Free Public Library is a public library located in the United States in Summit, New Jersey at 75 Maple Street. Besides books, DVDs, CDs, music, and educational CD-ROMs from The Teaching Company, it offers a wide range of services including lectures, art exhibits, cultural readings, movies, special events, programs for teenagers, and Internet access. It is a short walk from the library to the train station and to Summit's downtown area.

== History ==
In 1891, Summit's first library opened, but it was "neither public nor free," according to one account. That building later became the Summit Playhouse. In 1911, the first free public library opened on Maple Street on land donated by the Bonnel family's Summit Home Land Company. Funds from the estate of Andrew Carnegie helped build the library during the years of 1900 to 1917, and the Summit Public Library is listed among the 36 Carnegie libraries of New Jersey. In 1964, the library was replaced by a newer building next door. In 1996, there was a capital campaign to raise funds for the library; $1.3 million was raised, in part with a community production of "The Music Man". Construction began in October 1997. Users could still have access to books by walking inside temporary trailers during the expansion. The expanded and renovated building reopened in March 1999. There is a parking lot available between the library and the Summit YMCA; in addition, there are on-street metered parking spots available, some with a 15-minute limit to facilitate availability. In 2003, a young library staff member named Sherrie Murphy who had two young children died of cancer; in 2007, the library dedicated a statue entitled "The Joy of Reading" by sculptor Robert Hill in her memory, who made the sculpture without payment; the statue is outdoors on the eastern side of the building.

== Special programs ==
The library hosts week-long arts workshops and craft programs. The library also features prominent local artists and photographers. The library allows users to download audiobooks. Users can renew materials online. The library has a special weekday afterschool program for teens called CATSS, an acronym for Cool Awesome Teen Students of Summit, which involves mentoring, projects, book reading activities, and games, and which meets on selected afternoons. Sometimes lectures are held at the library. The library sometimes contributes boxes of books for charitable purposes. During summer months, the library sometimes sponsors film festivals in which award-winning foreign films are shown.

== Administration ==
Susan Permahos was appointed Library Director in 2013 assuming the position from Glenn Devitt who held the position for more than 20 years. Other administrators include Abigail Brady, Head of Adult Services, Ann-Marie Aymer, Head of Youth Services, Beata Barrasso, Head of Technical Services/System Administrator and Diane Hull, Head of Circulation. Library trustees in recent years have included Arthur T. Vanderbilt II, Ruth H. Hamann, Eleanor K.Haugh, John B. Crosby, Jr., Jon Plaut, Sandy Bloom, Christina Amundson, James G. Fleischmann, Susan Callahan and Diane Klaif. Trustee meetings are usually held on the second Wednesday of each month except during the summer.

== Policies ==
All Summit adult residents can have full-service library cards if they provide current proof of residence; cards are valid for three years. The library extends permission to various others such as non-resident students, employees who work in Summit, au pairs, and residents of neighboring towns on a reciprocal basis. The library offers free Internet access; filtering software has been installed on the terminals in the juvenile room. The library permits donations and gifts, although is unable to accept books in poor physical condition, textbooks, magazines, condensed book, encyclopedias, and encourages donations of bestsellers, new novels (published in the current year), up-to-date nonfiction books, recently published paperback novels, and current children's and young adult books. The library can't provide appraisals of the value of donated materials for tax purposes. Donors are encouraged to call first before bringing in books and tangible items. In addition, library policy states that members must not take pictures within the library without prior written permission from the director.

== See also ==
- List of Carnegie libraries in New Jersey
