= Union Baptist Church (New Rochelle, New York) =

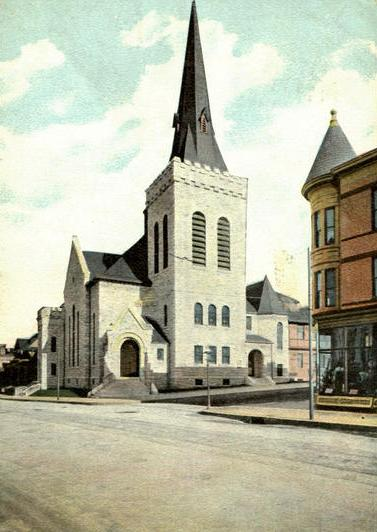

General information
- Architectural style: Neo-Romanesque
- Location: 438 Main Street, New Rochelle, New York
- Coordinates: 40°54′36″N 73°46′45″W
- Completed: 1904
- Destroyed: February 14, 2011

Design and construction
- Architect: Arthur Bates Jennings

Union Baptist Church was a historic house of worship located in Downtown New Rochelle, in Westchester County, New York. The church was added to Westchester Inventory of Historic Places in 1994, chosen for its cultural and historical characteristics as well as for its Neo-Romanesque edifice and unique architectural details.

== History ==
Two different congregations compose the cultural heritage of the church. It was originally built by the predominantly white Salem Baptist Church congregation. The current congregation, Union Baptist Church, is one of New Rochelle's earliest black religious organizations.

The church was designed by architect Arthur Bates Jennings, who configured the building's interior using the Akron Plan, an open spatial arrangement that is seen in only a few Westchester churches today. His use of ceiling stenciling was also unique and this church is the only one in the county to possess such detailing.

On February 14, 2011 a 5-alarm fire ripped through the historic building, destroying much of the interior structure. The building was demolished a day after the blaze.

The congregation now worships in temporary premises a block away at 466 Main St. New Rochelle. Website: www.ubcnr.com
