= Summit Playhouse =

- U.S. National Register of Historic Places
- New Jersey Register of Historic Places
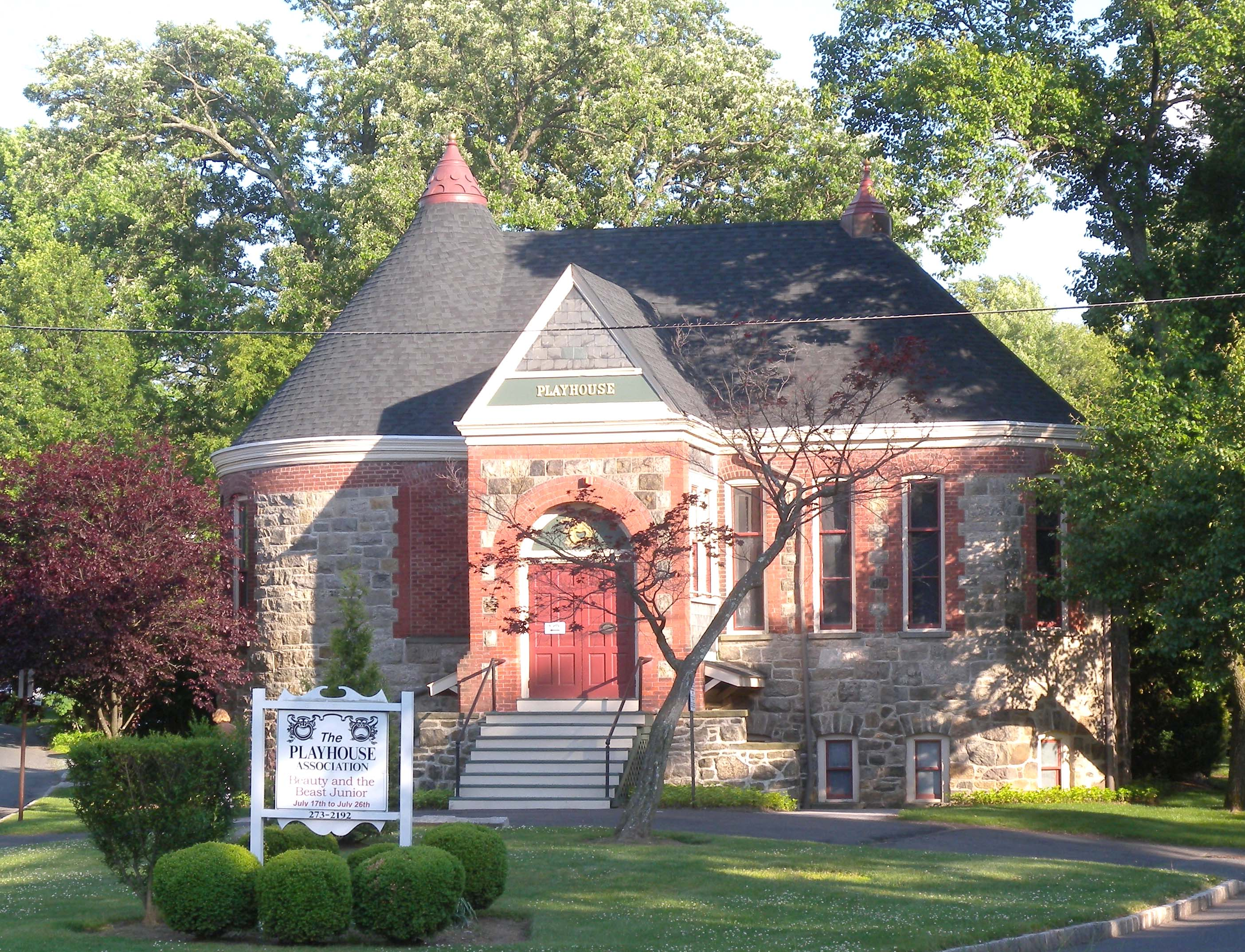
- Original 1891 building

- Location within Union County, New Jersey Location within New Jersey Location within the United States
- Location: 10 New England Avenue; Summit, New Jersey
- Coordinates: 40°42′54″N 74°21′55″W
- Built: ca. 1891
- Architect: Arthur Bates Jennings
- Architectural style: Romanesque
- NRHP reference No.: 09001177
- NJRHP No.: 4407

Significant dates
- Added to NRHP: December 30, 2009
- Designated NJRHP: September 29, 2009

The Summit Playhouse is a theater in Summit, New Jersey and home to one of the oldest continuously operating amateur community theaters in the United States producing a new show each calendar season. In 2011, it presented Meet Me in St. Louis, Closer Than Ever, and Speed the Plow.

== History ==
The original stone Romanesque building designed by Arthur Bates Jennings was constructed in 1891 as the town's first library. A municipally-operated Summit Public Library was established in 1900, and in 1910 the library was moved to another building, leaving the Romanesque building under-utilized but still belonging to the library. In 1918, The Playhouse Association was founded as a World War I relief organization, and the theatrical group rented the empty older library from the Summit Library Association for one dollar a year for the next fifty years on condition that the group maintain the facility. In 1960, a 120-seat auditorium was added and the original 1891 structure was converted into a stage. The Summit Library Association officially deeded the building to the theater in 1968.

== Directors ==
- Norman Lee Swartout (1918)
