= St. Lawrence Arts Center =

Historic church in Maine, United States

- St. Lawrence Arts Center (The Hill Arts)
- U.S. National Register of Historic Places
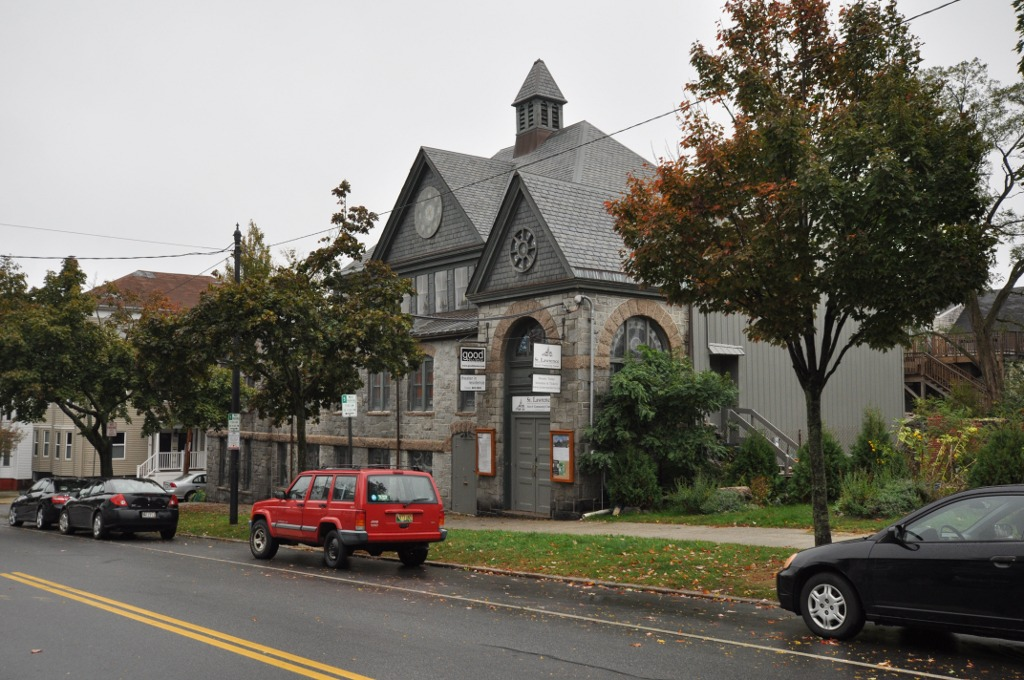
- As pictured in 2013.

- Location within Maine Location within the United States
- Location: 76 Congress St., Portland, Maine
- Coordinates: 43°40′1″N 70°14′48″W
- Area: 0.5 acres (0.20 ha)
- Built: 1897
- Architect: Arthur Jennings
- Architectural style: Queen Anne
- NRHP reference No.: 79000145
- Added to NRHP: October 01, 1979

The Hill Arts, formally known as the St. Lawrence Arts Centre, is a performing arts center and community space at 76 Congress Street in the Munjoy Hill district of Portland, Maine. It is situated in the former parish hall of the historic St. Lawrence Church, a Romanesque-style church built in 1897. Due to severe deterioration, the sanctuary of the former church was demolished in 2008, prompting the organization to fundraise and plan for a new performance arts space on the site. The church property was listed on the National Register of Historic Places in 1979.

== Current description ==
The Hill Arts stands northeast of the summit of Munjoy Hill, on the southeast side of Congress Street between Munjoy and Beckett Streets. The Parish Hall Center includes a 110-seat theater that is also leased for community events.

In 2023, the non-profit organization, Friends of St. Lawrence Centre, rebranded the center as The Hill Arts as part of a new fundraising campaign. The current project, a mid-sized, 400-seat theater, will fill the space left by the demolished church sanctuary. Construction began in October 2025.

== Location history ==
The local Congregationalists built the first St. Lawrence Chapel in 1854, but outgrew it a few decades later. The bigger church was built in 1897, designed by New York City architect Arthur Jennings. The building was unique in Maine for its combination of Richardsonian Romanesque and French Chateau elements. Maintenance suffered as the congregation dwindled in later years due to increasing costs and demographic changes; the church was added to the National Register of Historic Places in an effort to help preserve it. The congregation eventually dissolved itself in 1986 and de-consecrated the building.

The building stood empty until purchased in 1993 by a local resident. In 1996, she helped for the 501(c)3 non profit Friends of St. Lawrence Church the non-profit bought the building from the local woman for what she bought it for in 1993. The former sanctuary was demolished in 2008, but the parish hall was restored and renovated for use as a performing arts venue from 2001 until the present time.

== See also ==
- National Register of Historic Places listings in Portland, Maine
