= St. Timothy's Protestant Episcopal Church =

Historic church in Ohio, United States

- U.S. National Register of Historic Places
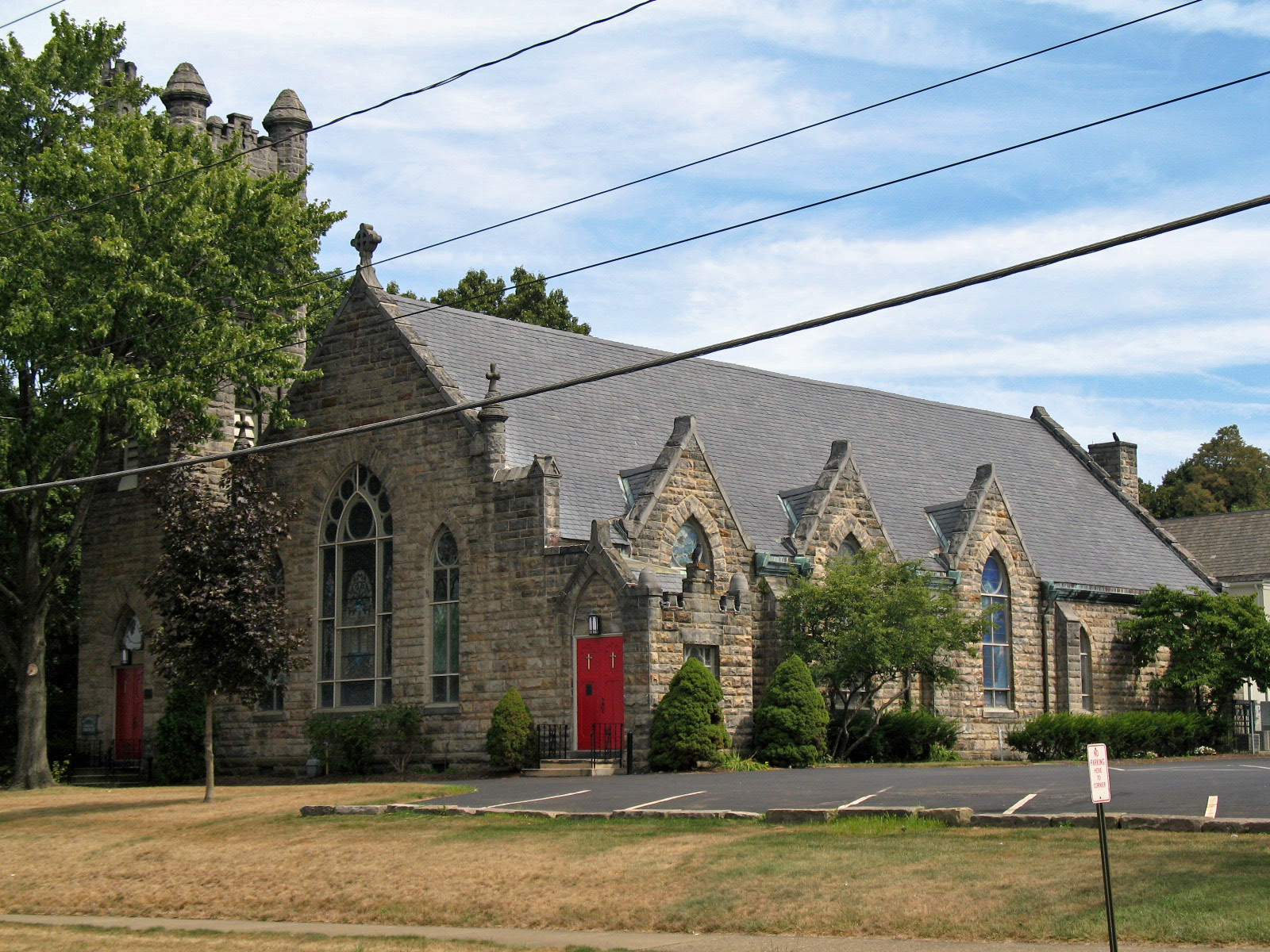

- Location within Ohio Location within the United States
- Location: 226 SE. 3rd St., Massillon, Ohio
- Coordinates: 40°47′44″N 81°31′4″W
- Area: 2 acres (0.81 ha)
- Built: 1892
- Architect: Jennings, Arthur B.
- Architectural style: Gothic
- NRHP reference No.: 79001953
- Added to NRHP: February 22, 1979

St. Timothy's Protestant Episcopal Church is a historic church at 226 SE. 3rd Street in Massillon, Ohio. It was built in 1892 and added to the National Register in 1979. It is a congregation of the Episcopal Diocese of Ohio.

The church reported 445 members in 2015 and 154 members in 2023; no membership statistics were reported nationally in 2024 parochial reports. Plate and pledge income reported for the congregation in 2024 was $208,427. Average Sunday attendance (ASA) in 2024 was 58 persons.
