= Victoria Beach, Nova Scotia =

Community in Nova Scotia, Canada

Coordinates: 44°40′38.79″N 65°45′13.9″W

Victoria Beach in Nova Scotia

Victoria Beach is a community in the Canadian province of Nova Scotia, located in Annapolis County. It is on the shore of Digby Gut, a narrow channel connecting the Bay of Fundy with the Annapolis Basin.

In 1849, it was the western terminus of Nova Scotia pony express, and a federal plaque in the community commemorates it.

The heritage lighthouse at Battery Point is an 8-metre-tall (26 ft) wooden structure with octagonal iron lantern and was built in 1901.

The area was labelled as Andromeda on a 1609 map by Marc Lescarbot, but was renamed for Queen Victoria following her silver jubilee in 1862.

== See also ==
- Royal eponyms in Canada
