= New York Evening Express =

American newspaper

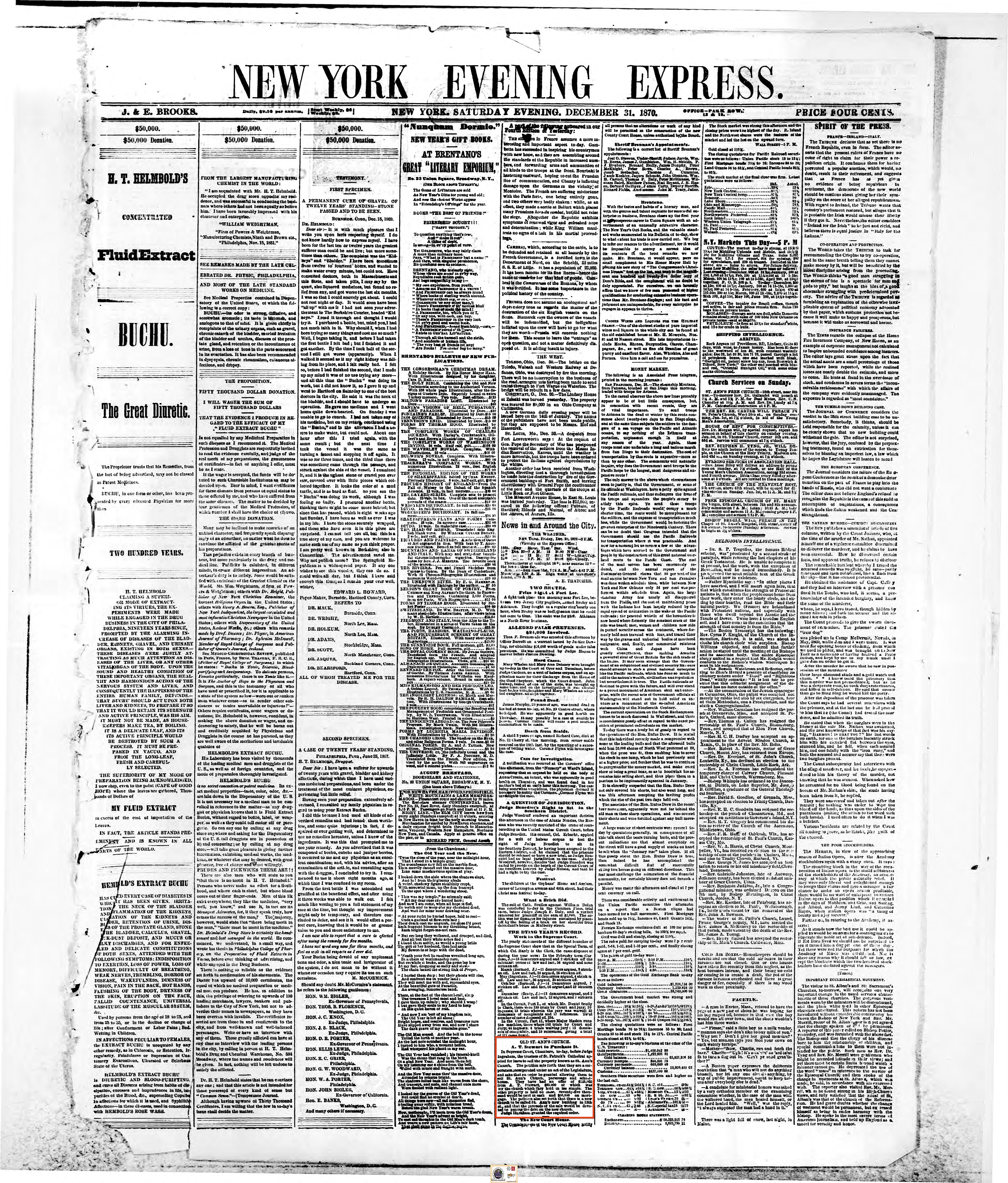
- Front page of the New York Evening Express, Saturday, December 31, 1870
- Type: Daily newspaper
- Editor: James Brooks (from 1836 to 1873)
- Founded: June 20, 1836 (as the New York Express)
- Ceased publication: December 1881
- Headquarters: New York City, NY, U.S.

The New York Evening Express (1836–1881) was a 19th-century American newspaper published in New York City.

== Publication history ==
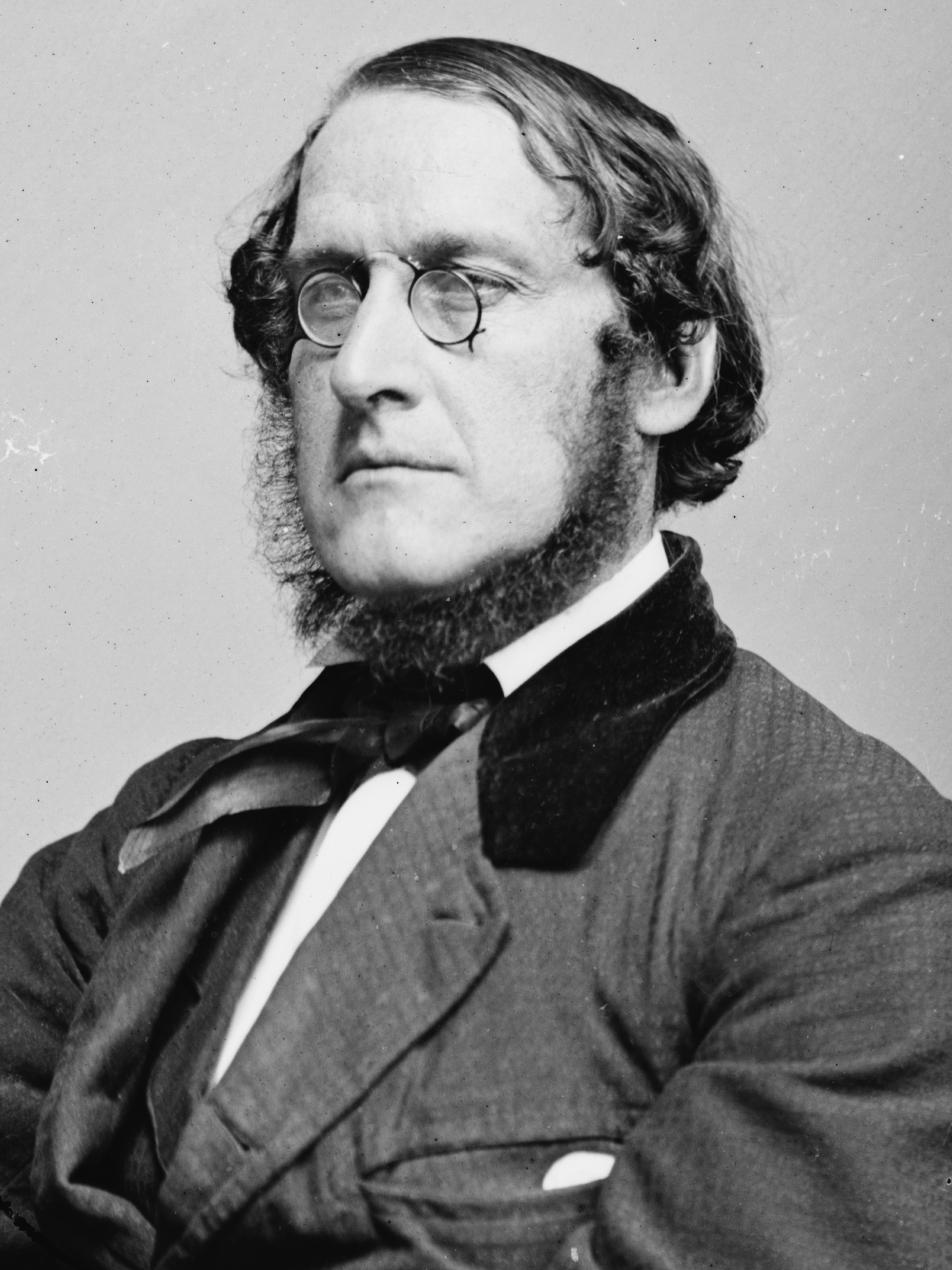
James Brooks, c. 1855–1865

The Express began publication on June 20, 1836, as the New York Express, a Whig publication under the direction of James Brooks, formerly an editor of the Portland Advertiser in Maine, with the assistance of Brooks' younger brother Erastus Brooks (originally as their Washington correspondent). Robert E. Hudson served at its initial commercial editor. It was merged with Hudson's Prices Current and Shipping List upon its creation, and on November 1, 1836, merged with the Daily Advertiser founded in 1817 by Theodore Dwight, and thus referred to as the New York Daily Express. William B. Townsend of the Advertiser became a part owner of the Express with James Brooks.

When the Whig Party declined, the Express supported the Know Nothing movement, and then the Constitutional Union Party, followed by the Democrats.

James Brooks remained editor-in-chief of the paper until his death in 1873, and in June 1877 Erastus gave over control to a group led by John Kelly (a boss of Tammany Hall) and Augustus Schell, though he still made contributions to the paper. In late 1881 Cyrus West Field acquired the Express (which had a coveted New York Associated Press membership) and merged it into the New York Evening Mail, creating the New York Evening Mail and Daily Express. The Evening Mail survived until 1924 (it dropped the "Express" part of its name completely by 1904).

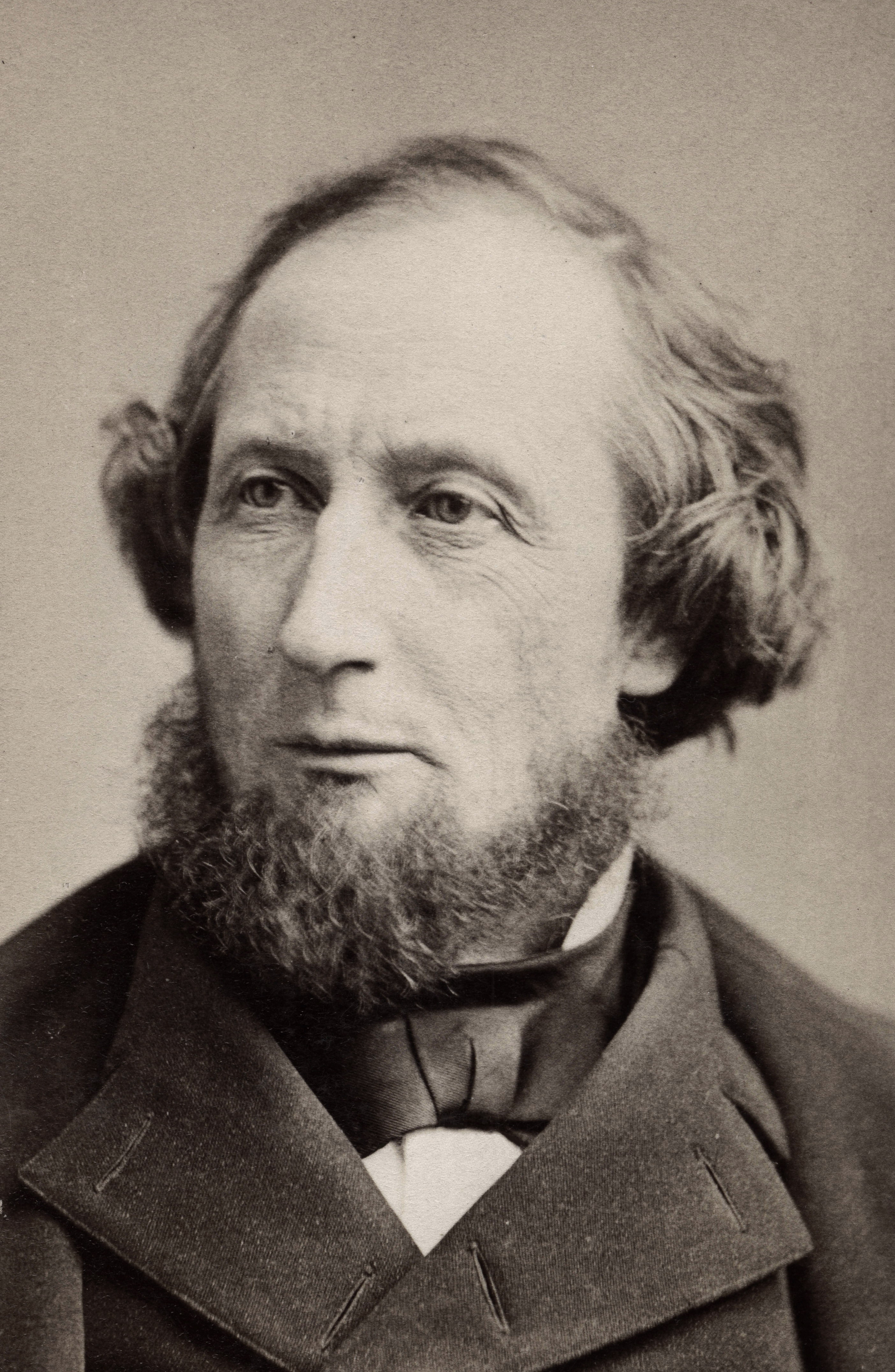
Cyrus W. Field (c. 1870) acquired the Express in December 1881 and merged it into the New York Evening Mail

== Content ==
Historian Richard Schwarzlose has referred to the Evening Express as "never an outstanding newspaper" (1990). This agrees with Frederic Hudson's colorful observations about the paper in Journalism in the United States (1873), though Hudson was also managing editor of the rival New York Herald from 1846 to 1866. Hudson remarked that the Express was "remarkable for its politics, its numerous editions, and its strangers' lists" (list of daily arrivals at local hotels). The "Strangers' List" was popular with merchants looking for customers, which led Herald editor James Gordon Bennett, Sr. to once call the paper the Drummer's Gazette.

Hudson also remarked that the Express had "a character of its own. ... Its editorials seem hurriedly written, and have a sort of homely vigor about them. Every thing about the paper looks as if it had been thrown together with great haste. .... It will take news wherever and whenever it can get it, but it has little or no individual enterprise outside of the Associated Press." Hudson remarked that its readership "is largely confined to the numerous railway cars and steam-boats running to and from and within the limits of the city, where a numerous class engaged in business in the metropolis do all their reading," and had "outlived a number of evening papers."

The New York Times 1886 obituary of Erastus Brooks described the paper as "prosperous" from 1860 to 1870, and though "its make-up was typographically an abomination" it "always had the news, and in the days before railroads and telegraphs were known it earned the reputation of getting all the news possible, and as early as possible."

One anecdote shared in the younger Brooks' obituary is that in order to get the news printed quickly after an election in the early 1840s, the younger Brooks set up a printing office in a steamboat returning from Albany to New York with the election returns, so that upon arriving in New York they were ready to go to press with the results before the rival papers.

In January 1847, the Express accepted the offer of Ezra Cornell to use his new telegraph line from Albany to New York to get legislative news, and was able to publish a new message from the governor in advance of the pony express line used by the Herald. Beaten badly to press, it is said that the Herald then abandoned its opposition to the telegraph.

The political bent of the Express followed the opinions of the Brooks brothers. James Brooks served as a Whig in the U.S. Congress from 1849 to 1853, and as a Democrat from 1863 to 1866 and from 1867 until his death. After Brooks declared in Congress in February 1864 that the Democratic Party should stop defending slavery, the Express also moved in that direction.

== Editions ==
The Express originally had both morning and evening editions. The morning edition probably inserted the word "morning" into its title around 1843, disappeared by about 1864. The edition under the "evening" name probably commenced in 1839, and became the edition by which the paper is best known. For many years a "Semi-Weekly" edition was also published. By the end of its run, the paper was publishing four editions of the "Evening" every day, at 12:30, 1:30, 2:30, and 3:30 p.m., as well as a Weekly Express edition (which it advertised also included sermons from Thomas De Witt Talmage).

== Locations ==
The Express had a number of headquarters during its existence. It started in 1836 in an office on Wall Street, and after a fire moved to the corner of Centre Street and City Hall place. It later moved to the National Hotel building at 112 Broadway (later occupied by Delmonico's restaurant), and then to Wall and Nassau Street, and moved to its final location around 1873 to a building constructed for the paper at 23 Park Row.
