= Baltimore–Washington telegraph line =

Long-distance telegraph system in the United States

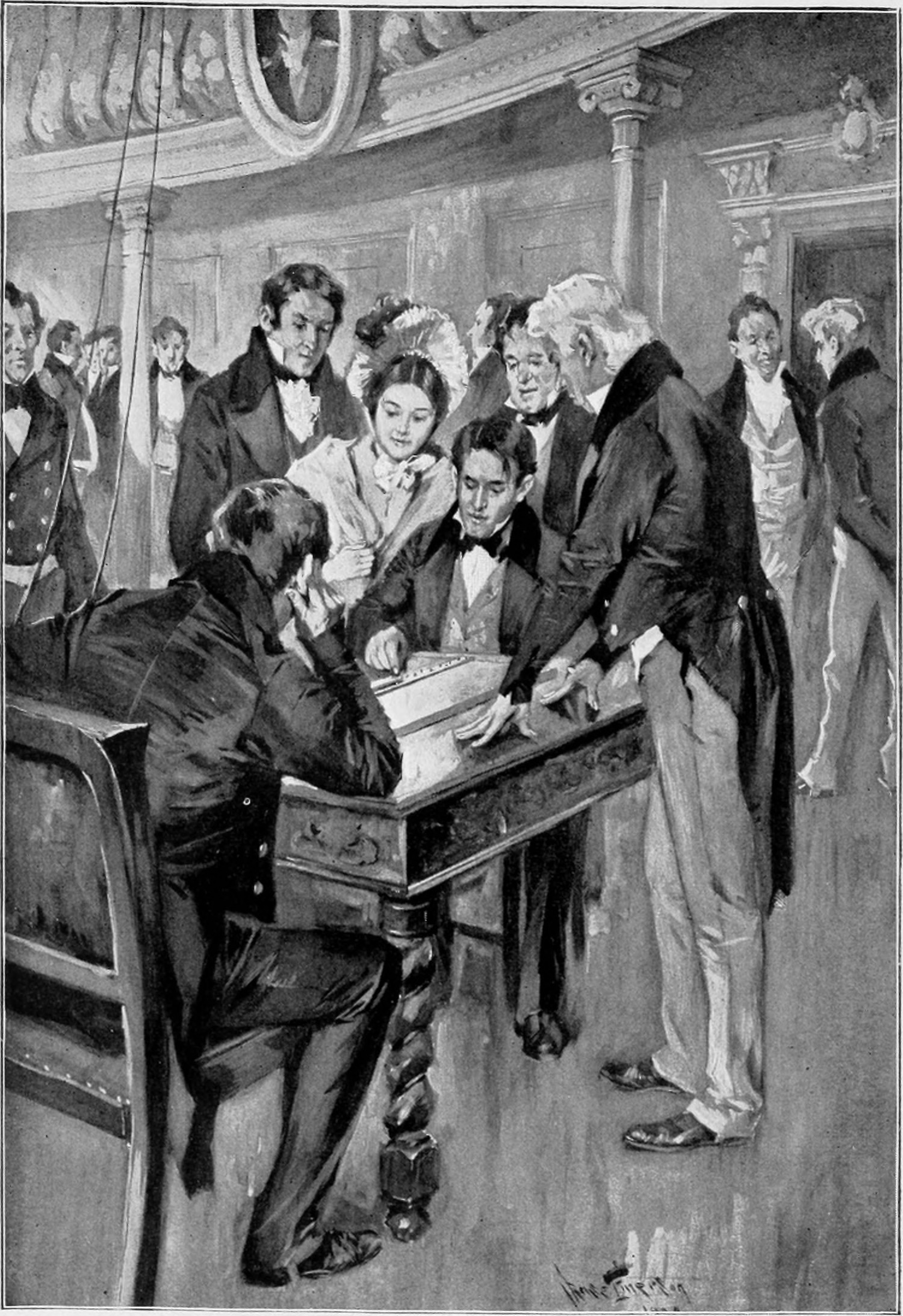
The first telegram. Professor Samuel Morse sending the dispatch as dictated by Miss Annie Ellsworth

The Baltimore–Washington telegraph line was the first long-distance electric telegraph system set up to run overland in the United States.

== Building of line ==
In March 1843, the US Congress appropriated US$30,000 (equivalent to $1,036,607 in 2025) to Samuel Morse to lay a telegraph line between Washington, D.C., and Baltimore, Maryland, along the right-of-way of the Baltimore and Ohio Railroad.

Morse originally decided to lay the wire underground, asking Ezra Cornell to lay the line using a special cable-laying plow that Cornell had developed. Wire began to be laid in Baltimore on October 21, 1843. Cornell's plow was pulled by eight mules, and cut a ditch two inches (five centimeters) wide and 20 inches (50 centimeters) deep, laid a pipe with the wires, and reburied the pipe, in an integrated operation. However, the project was stopped after about 9 1/2 miles (15 kilometres) of wire was laid because the line was failing.

Morse learned that Cooke and Wheatstone were using poles for their lines in England and decided to follow their lead. Installation of the lines and poles from Washington to Baltimore began on April 1, 1844, using chestnut poles 23 feet (7 m) high spaced 300 feet (90 m) apart, for a total of about 700 poles. Two 16-gauge copper wires were installed; they were insulated with cotton thread, shellac, and a mixture of "beeswax, resin, linseed oil, and asphalt." A test of the still incomplete line occurred on May 1, 1844, when news of the Whig Party's nomination of Henry Clay for U.S. President was sent from the party's convention in Baltimore to the Capitol Building in Washington.

== Operations ==
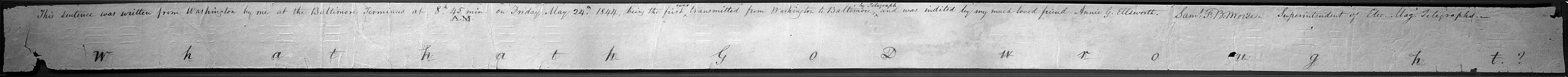
Text of the first telegraph message sent by Samuel F. B. Morse. Presented to Miss Annie G. Ellsworth, daughter of Henry Leavitt Ellsworth. Annie's ink tracing over Morse's pencilled letters. Gift to Library of Congress by Mrs. George Inness, daughter of Annie Ellsworth

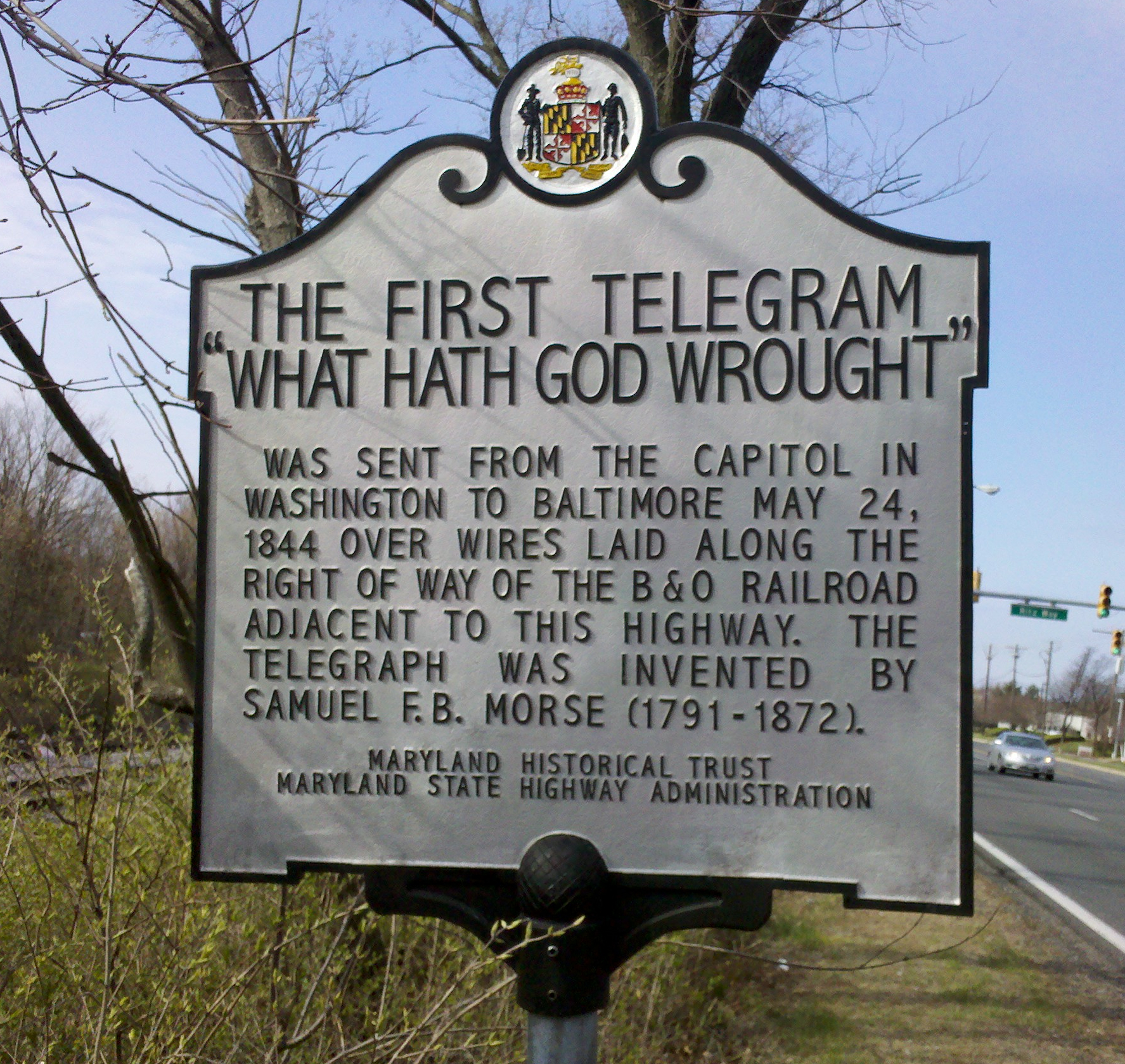
Maryland state historical marker of the first telegraph message, in its former location between US Highway 1 and railroad tracks in Beltsville, Maryland.

Morse's line was demonstrated on May 24, 1844, from the Old Supreme Court Chamber in the United States Capitol in Washington to the Mount Clare station of the railroad in Baltimore, and commenced with the transmission of Morse's first message (from Washington) to Alfred Vail (in Baltimore), "What hath God wrought", a phrase from the Bible's Book of Numbers. The phrase was suggested by Annie Ellsworth, whose husband was a supporter of Morse's, and knew Morse was religious.

As U.S. Postmaster General, Cave Johnson was in charge of the line. Morse was made superintendent of the line, and Alfred Vail and Henry Rogers the operators.

The next year, Johnson reported that "the importance of [the line] to the public does not consist of any probable income that can ever be derived from it," which led to the invention being returned for private development.

== See also ==
- First transcontinental telegraph
- Timeline of North American telegraphy
