= Joseph Barker Stearns =

Inventor

- Born: February 28, 1831
- Died: July 4, 1895 (aged 64)
- Known for: Inventor of the duplex system of telegraphy

Joseph Barker Stearns (1831-1895) was the inventor of the duplex system of telegraphy.

== Biography ==
Stearns was the son of Edward Ray and Eliza Tyler Barker Stearns of Weld, Maine. As a youth, he worked on a farm. He studied telegraphy at Newburyport, Massachusetts, where he became manager of the office. From 1855 to 1869, he was superintendent of the Fire Alarm Telegraph Company of Boston, Massachusetts and was the first to take out patents on the use of reversed currents in connection with the fire alarm signal system.

Stearns was president of Franklin Telegraph Co. from 1869 to 1871, during which time he invented the first practical system of duplex telegraphy and saw it successfully applied to the English, French and Belgian lines. Two years later this system was used for the Atlantic cables. He sold rights under his duplex patents to the Western Union Telegraph and Cable Companies, receiving large royalties for the use of his inventions from governments in England, France, Italy, Spain, Belgium, Russia and India, and several submarine cable companies. From 1879 to 1880, he was employed as engineer by the Mexican Telegraph Company in making, laying, and putting into operation the cables of that company between Galveston, Texas, and Veracruz, Mexico. In 1881, he performed a similar service for the Central and South American Telegraph Company, whose cables extended from the Isthmus of Tehuantepec in Mexico to Callao, Peru, in all between 4,000 and 5,000 miles. This work he completed in 1882.

He retired from active business in 1885 and settled in Camden, Maine. There he had a library of 10,000 volumes, and a collection of Chiriquí Province pottery, which was exhibited at the Smithsonian Institution in Washington, D.C. He also had a collection of carved ivories which was exhibited at the Metropolitan Museum of Art in New York City. He died in Camden.

== Family ==
He had eight children. He got married on January 8, 1853, to Lois M. Brooks of Putney, Vermont (born June 4, 1827; died July 29, 1861, in South Boston), then married Frances Amanda Edmonds of Portsmouth, New Hampshire (born January 16, 1838) on June 6, 1866.

== Honors ==
In 1872, the American Institute of New York awarded him the Great Medal of Honor for the invention of the duplex telegraph.
